= Aston Martin =

British automotive company

Aston Martin Lagonda Global Holdings PLC
- Formerly: Aston Martin Lagonda Global Holdings Limited (July–September 2018)
- Type: Public limited company
- Traded as: LSE: AML
- ISIN: GB00BFXZC448
- Industry: Automotive
- Founded: 15 January 1913; 113 years ago
- Founders: Lionel Martin; Robert Bamford
- Headquarters: Gaydon, Warwickshire, England, United Kingdom
- Area served: Worldwide
- Key people: Lawrence Stroll (Executive Chairman); Adrian Hallmark (Chief Executive Officer); Marek Reichman (Chief Creative Officer)
- Products: Luxury cars; Sports cars; Grand tourers
- Brands: Aston Martin; Lagonda
- Revenue: ▼£1.2577 billion (2025)
- Operating income: ▼£−259.2 million (2025)
- Net income: ▼£−493 million (2025)
- Total assets: ▼£2.8055 billion (2025)
- Total equity: ▼£329.2 million (2025)
- Number of employees: 3,000 (2025)
- Subsidiaries: Aston Martin Racing
- Website: astonmartinlagonda.com

Aston Martin Lagonda Global Holdings PLC (/ˈæstən/) is a British manufacturer of luxury sports cars and grand tourers. Its predecessor was founded in 1913 by Lionel Martin and Robert Bamford. Headed from 1947 by David Brown, it became associated with expensive grand touring cars in the 1950s and 1960s, and with the fictional character James Bond following his use of a DB5 model in the 1964 film Goldfinger. Their grand tourers and sports cars are regarded as a British cultural icon.

Aston Martin has held a royal warrant as purveyor of motorcars to Charles III (as Prince of Wales and later as King) since 1982, and has over 160 car dealerships in 53 countries, making it a global automobile brand. The company is traded on the London Stock Exchange. In 2003 it received the Queen's Award for Enterprise for outstanding contribution to international trade. The company has survived seven bankruptcies throughout its history.

The headquarters and main production of its sports cars and grand tourers are in a 55-acre (22 ha) facility in Gaydon, Warwickshire, England, on the former site of RAF Gaydon, adjacent to the Jaguar Land Rover Gaydon Centre. The old 3.6-acre (1.5 ha) facility in Newport Pagnell, Buckinghamshire, is the present home of the Aston Martin Works classic car department, which focuses on heritage sales, service, spares and restoration operations. The 90-acre (36 ha) factory in St Athan, Wales, features three converted 'super-hangars' from MOD St Athan, and serves as the production site of Aston Martin's SUV, the DBX.

Aston Martin has been involved in motorsport at various points in its history, mainly in sports car racing, and also in Formula One. The Aston Martin brand is increasingly being used, mostly through licensing, on other products including a submarine, real estate development, and aircraft.

== History ==
=== Founding ===
Aston Martin was founded in 1913 by Lionel Martin and Robert Bamford. The two had joined forces as Bamford & Martin the previous year to sell cars made by Singer from premises in Callow Street, London where they also serviced GWK and Calthorpe vehicles. Martin raced specials at Aston Hill near Aston Clinton, and the pair decided to make their own vehicles. The first car to be named Aston Martin was created by Martin by fitting a four-cylinder Coventry-Simplex engine to the chassis of a 1908 Isotta Fraschini.

They acquired premises at Henniker Mews in Kensington and produced their first car in March 1915. Production could not start because of the outbreak of the First World War, when Martin joined the Admiralty and Bamford joined the Army Service Corps.

=== 1918–1939: Interwar years ===
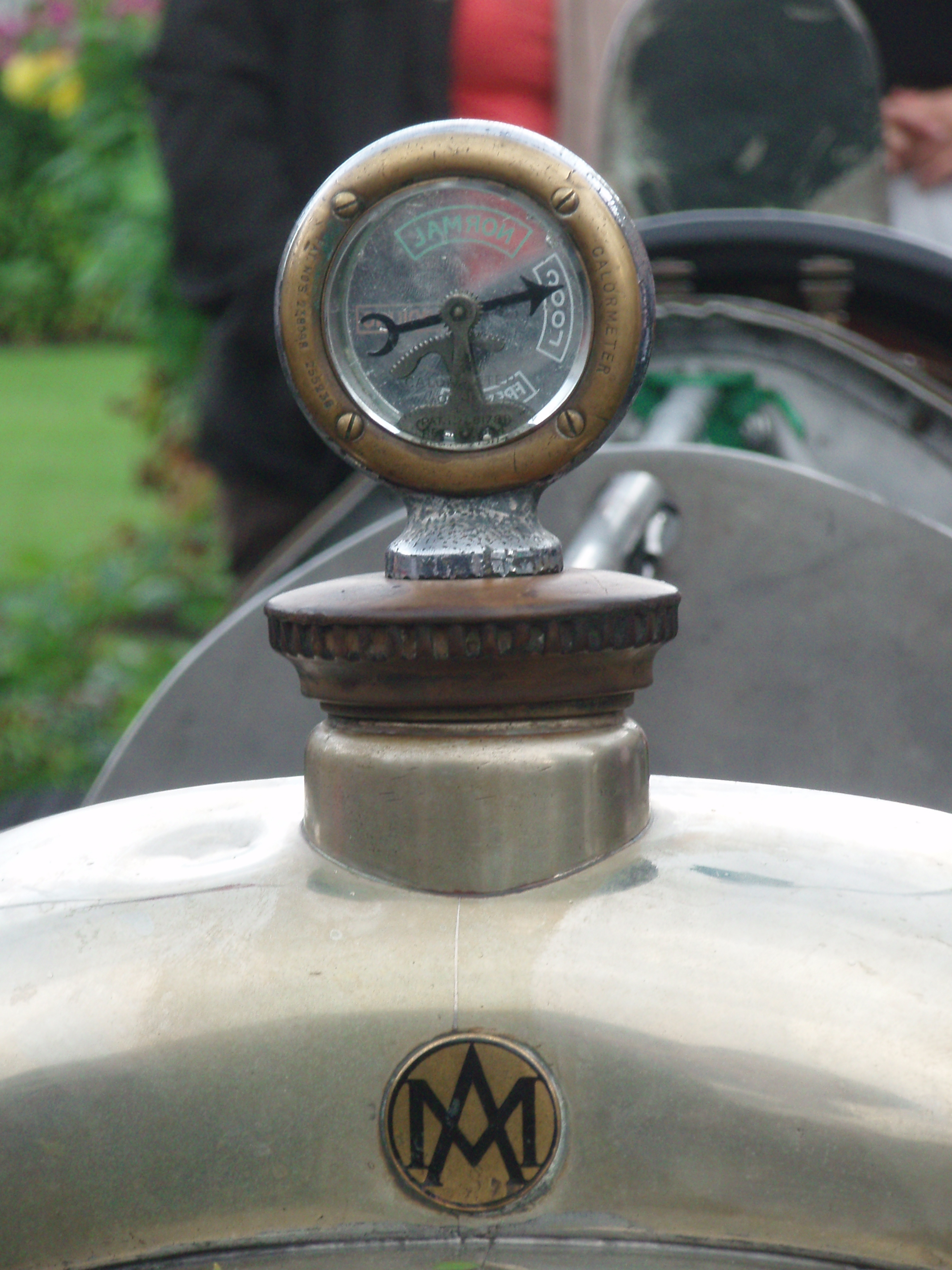
1923 Razor Blade Team car

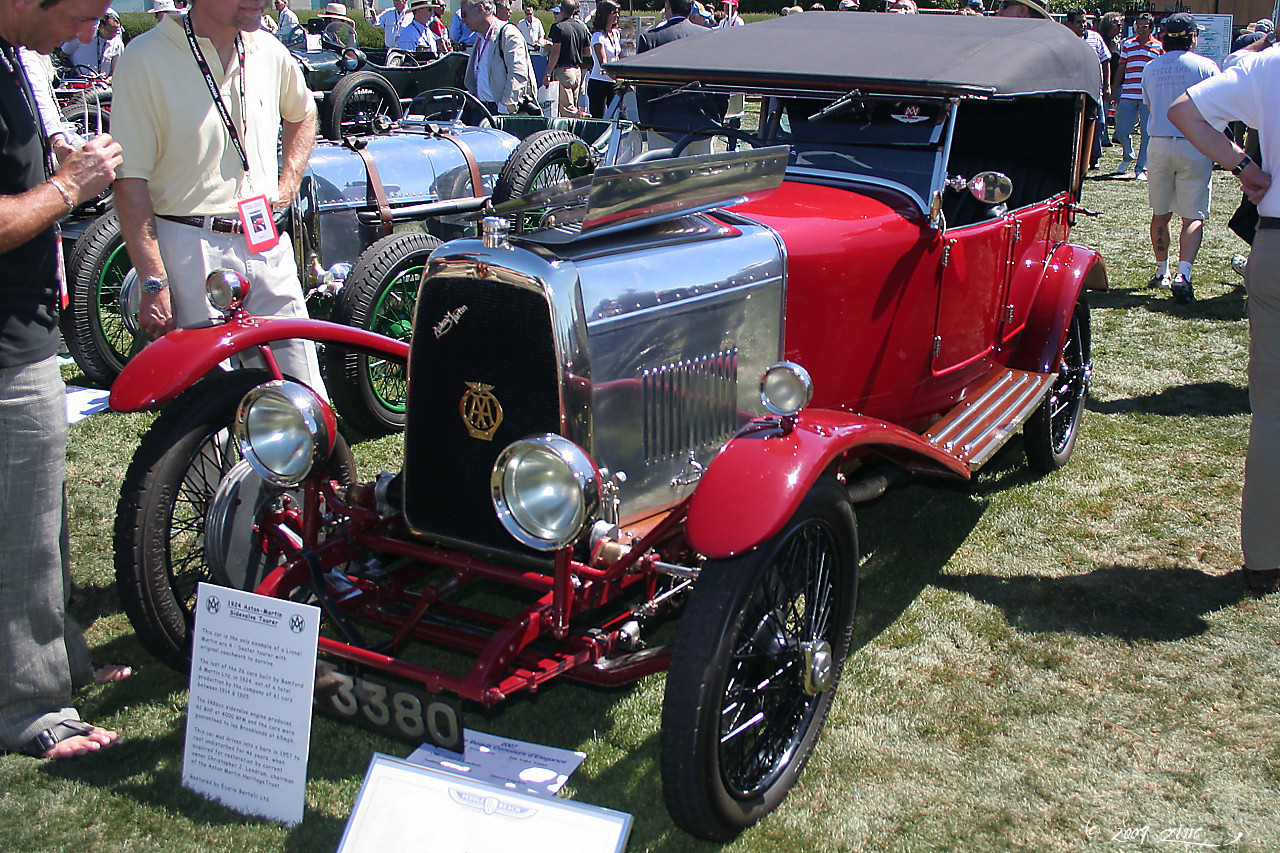
1924 tourer

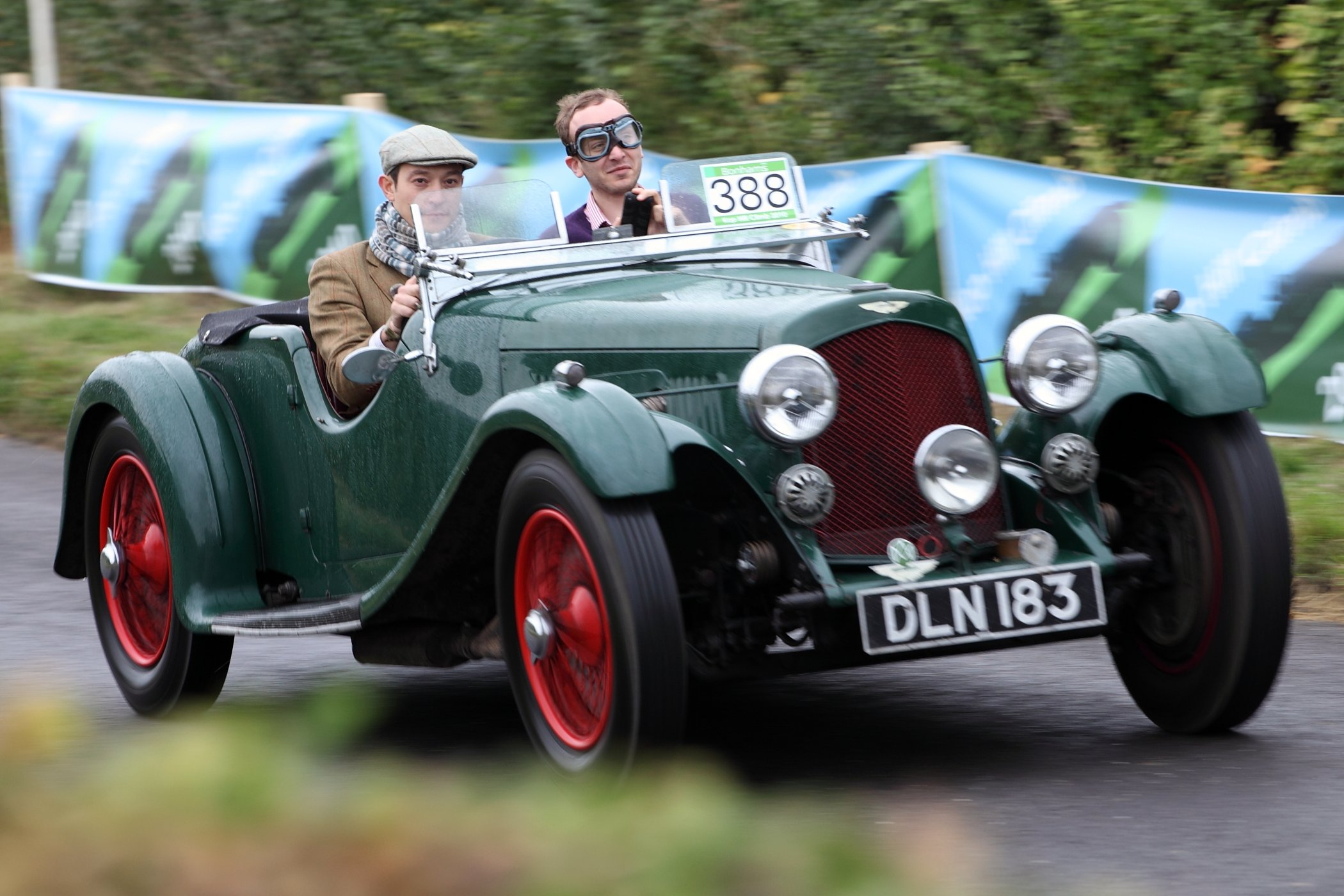
1937 2-Litre open 2/4-seater Speed model, Kop Hill 2010

After the war, they found new premises at Abingdon Road, Kensington, and designed a new car. Bamford left in 1920 and Bamford & Martin was revitalised with funding from Louis Zborowski. In 1922, Bamford & Martin produced cars to compete in the French Grand Prix, which went on to set world speed and endurance records at Brooklands. Three works Team Cars with 16-valve twin cam engines were built for racing and record-breaking: chassis number 1914, later developed as the Green Pea; chassis number 1915, the Razor Blade record car; and chassis number 1916, later developed as the Halford Special.

Approximately 55 cars were built for sale in two configurations; long chassis and short chassis. Bamford & Martin went bankrupt in 1924 and was bought by Dorothea, Lady Charnwood, who put her son John Benson on the board. Bamford & Martin got into financial difficulty again in 1925 and Martin was forced to sell the company (Bamford had already left it in 1920).

Later that year, Bill Renwick, Augustus (Bert) Bertelli and investors including Lady Charnwood took control of the business. They renamed it Aston Martin Motors and moved it to the former Whitehead Aircraft Limited Hanworth works in Feltham. Renwick and Bertelli had been in partnership some years and had developed an overhead-cam four-cylinder engine using Renwick's patented combustion chamber design, which they had tested in an Enfield-Allday chassis. The only "Renwick and Bertelli" motor car made, it was known as "Buzzbox" and still survives.

The pair had planned to sell their engine to motor manufacturers, but having heard that Aston Martin was no longer in production realised they could capitalise on its reputation to jump-start the production of a completely new car.

Between 1926 and 1937 Bertelli was both technical director and designer of all new Aston Martins, since known as "Bertelli cars". They included the 1½-litre "T-type", "International", "Le Mans", "MKII" and its racing derivative, the "Ulster", and the 2-litre 15/98 and its racing derivative, the "Speed Model". Most were open two-seater sports cars bodied by Bert Bertelli's brother Enrico (Harry), with a small number of long-chassis four-seater tourers, dropheads and saloons also produced.

Bertelli was a competent driver keen to race his cars, one of few owner/manufacturer/drivers. The "LM" team cars were very successful in national and international motor racing including at Le Mans.

Financial problems reappeared in 1932. Aston Martin was rescued for a year by Lance Prideaux Brune before passing it on to Sir Arthur Sutherland. In 1936, Aston Martin decided to concentrate on road cars, producing just 700 until World War II halted work. Production shifted to aircraft components during the war.

=== 1947–1972: David Brown ===
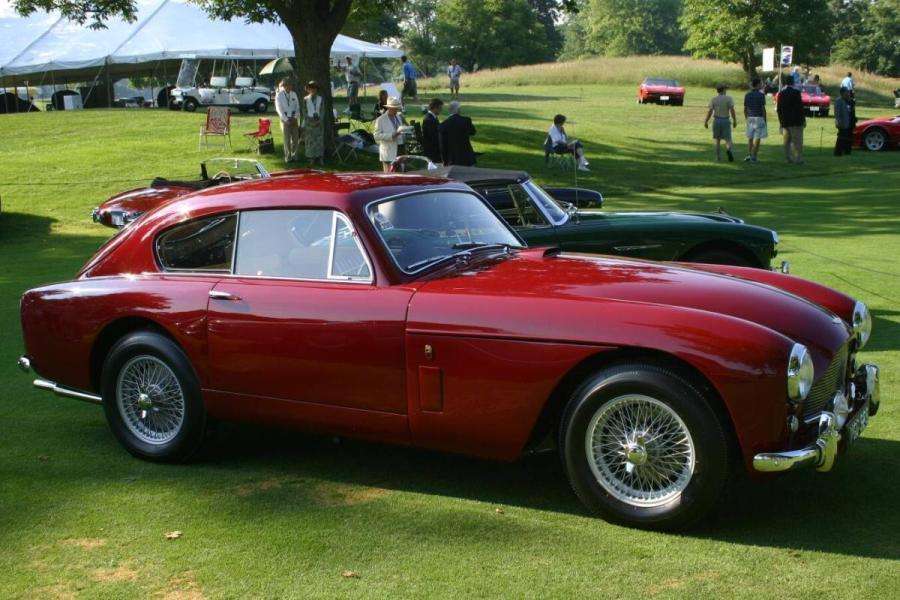
1958 Aston Martin DB Mark III

In 1947, old-established (1860) privately owned Huddersfield gear and machine tools manufacturer David Brown Limited bought Aston Martin, putting it under control of its Tractor Group. David Brown became Aston Martin's latest saviour. He also acquired Lagonda, without its factory, for its 2.6-litre W. O. Bentley-designed engine. Lagonda moved operations to Newport Pagnell and shared engines, resources and workshops. Aston Martin began to build the classic "DB" series of cars.

In April 1950, they announced planned production of their Le Mans prototype to be called the DB2, followed by the DB2/4 in 1953, the DB2/4 MkII in 1955, the DB Mark III in 1957 and the Italian-styled 3.7 L DB4 in 1958.

While these models helped Aston Martin establish a good racing pedigree, the DB4 stood out and yielded the famous DB5 in 1963. Aston stayed true to its grand touring style with the DB6 (1965–70), and DBS (1967–1972).

The six-cylinder engines of these cars from 1954 up to 1965 were designed by Tadek Marek.

=== 1972–1975: William Willson ===
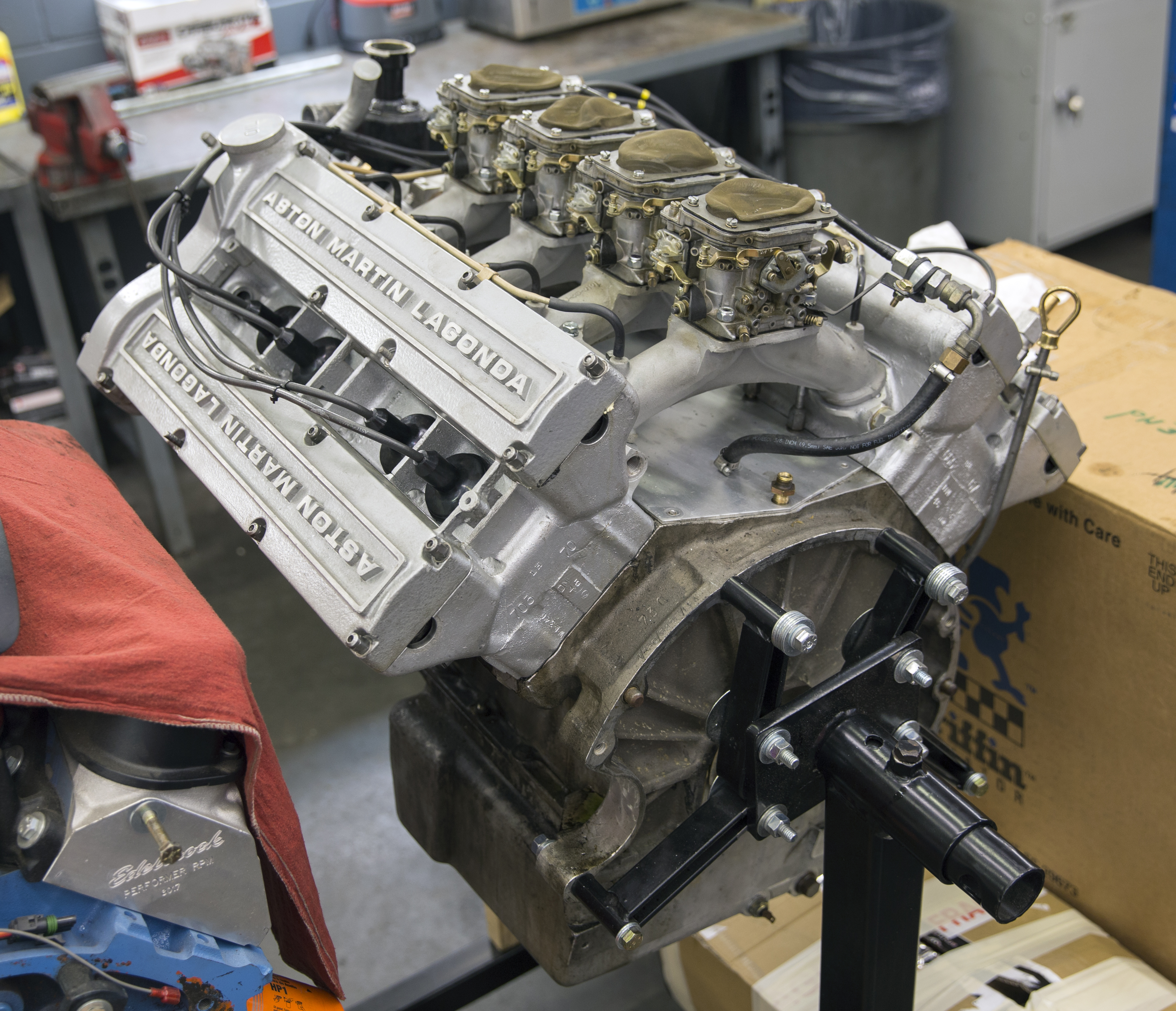
The Tadek Marek-designed V8 engine was a mainstay of the Aston Martin lineup for decades, and was built from 1969 until 2000.

Aston Martin was often financially troubled. In 1972, David Brown paid off all its debts, said to be £5 million or more, and handed it for £101 to Company Developments, a Birmingham-based investment bank consortium chaired by accountant William Willson. More detail on this period may be read at Willson's biography. The worldwide recession, lack of working capital and the difficulties of developing an engine to meet California's exhaust emission requirements – it stopped the company's US sales – again pulled Aston Martin into receivership at the end of 1974. The company had employed 460 workers when the manufacturing plant closed.

=== 1975–1981: Sprague and Curtis ===
The receiver sold the business in April 1975 for £1.05 million to North American businessman Peter Sprague of National Semiconductor, Toronto hotelier George Minden, and Jeremy Turner, a London businessman, who insisted to reporters that Aston Martin remained a British controlled business. Sprague later claimed he had fallen in love with the factory, not the cars, the workforce's craftsmanship dedication and intelligence. At this point, he and Minden had brought in investor Alan Curtis, a British office property developer, together with George Flather, a retired Sheffield steel magnate.

Six months later, in September 1975, the factory – shut down the previous December – re-opened under its new owner as Aston Martin Lagonda Limited with 100 employees, and planned to lift staff to 250 by the end of 1975. In January 1976, AML revealed that it now held orders for 150 cars for the US, 100 for other markets and another 80 from a Japanese importing agency. At the Geneva Motor Show, Fred Hartley, managing director and sales director for 13 years before that, announced he had resigned over "differences in marketing policy".

The new owners pushed Aston Martin into modernising its line, introducing the V8 Vantage in 1977, the convertible Volante in 1978, and the one-off Bulldog styled by William Towns in 1980. Towns also styled the futuristic new Lagonda saloon, based on the V8 model.

Curtis, who had a 42% stake in Aston Martin, also brought about a change in direction from the usual customers who were Aston Martin fans, to successful young married businessmen. Prices had been increased by 25%. There was speculation that AML was about to buy Italian automobile manufacturer Lamborghini. At the end of the 1970s, there was widespread debate about running MG into the Aston Martin consortium. 85 Conservative MPs formed themselves into a pressure group to get British Leyland to release their grip and hand it over. CH Industrials plc (car components) bought a 10% share in AML. But in July 1980, blaming a recession, AML cut back their workforce of 450 by more than 20%, making those people redundant.

=== 1981–1987: Victor Gauntlett ===
In January 1981, there having been no satisfactory revival partners, Alan Curtis and Peter Sprague announced they had never intended to maintain a long-term financial stake in Aston Martin Lagonda and it was to be sold to Pace Petroleum's Victor Gauntlett. Sprague and Curtis pointed out that under their ownership AML finances had improved to where an offer for MG might have been feasible.

Gauntlett bought a 12.5% stake in Aston Martin for £500,000 via Pace Petroleum in 1980, with Tim Hearley of CH Industrials taking a similar share. Pace and CHI took over as joint 50/50 owners at the beginning of 1981, with Gauntlett as executive chairman. Gauntlett also led the sales team, and after some development and publicity when the Lagonda became the world's fastest four-seater production car, was able to sell the car in Oman, Kuwait, and Qatar. In 1982, Aston Martin was granted a Royal Warrant of Appointment by the Prince of Wales.

Understanding that it would take some time to develop new Aston Martin products, they created an engineering service subsidiary to develop automotive products for other companies. It was decided to use a trade name of Salmons & Son, their in-house coachbuilder, Tickford, which Aston Martin had bought in 1955. Tickford's name had been long associated with expensive high-quality carriages and cars along with their folding roofs. New products included a Tickford Austin Metro, a Tickford Ford Capri and even Tickford train interiors, particularly on the Jaguar XJS. Pace continued sponsoring racing events, and now sponsored all Aston Martin Owners Club events, taking a Tickford-engined Nimrod Group C car owned by AMOC President Viscount Downe, which came third in the Manufacturers Championship in both 1982 and 1983. It also finished seventh in the 1982 24 Hours of Le Mans race. However, sales of production cars were now at an all-time low of 30 cars produced in 1982.

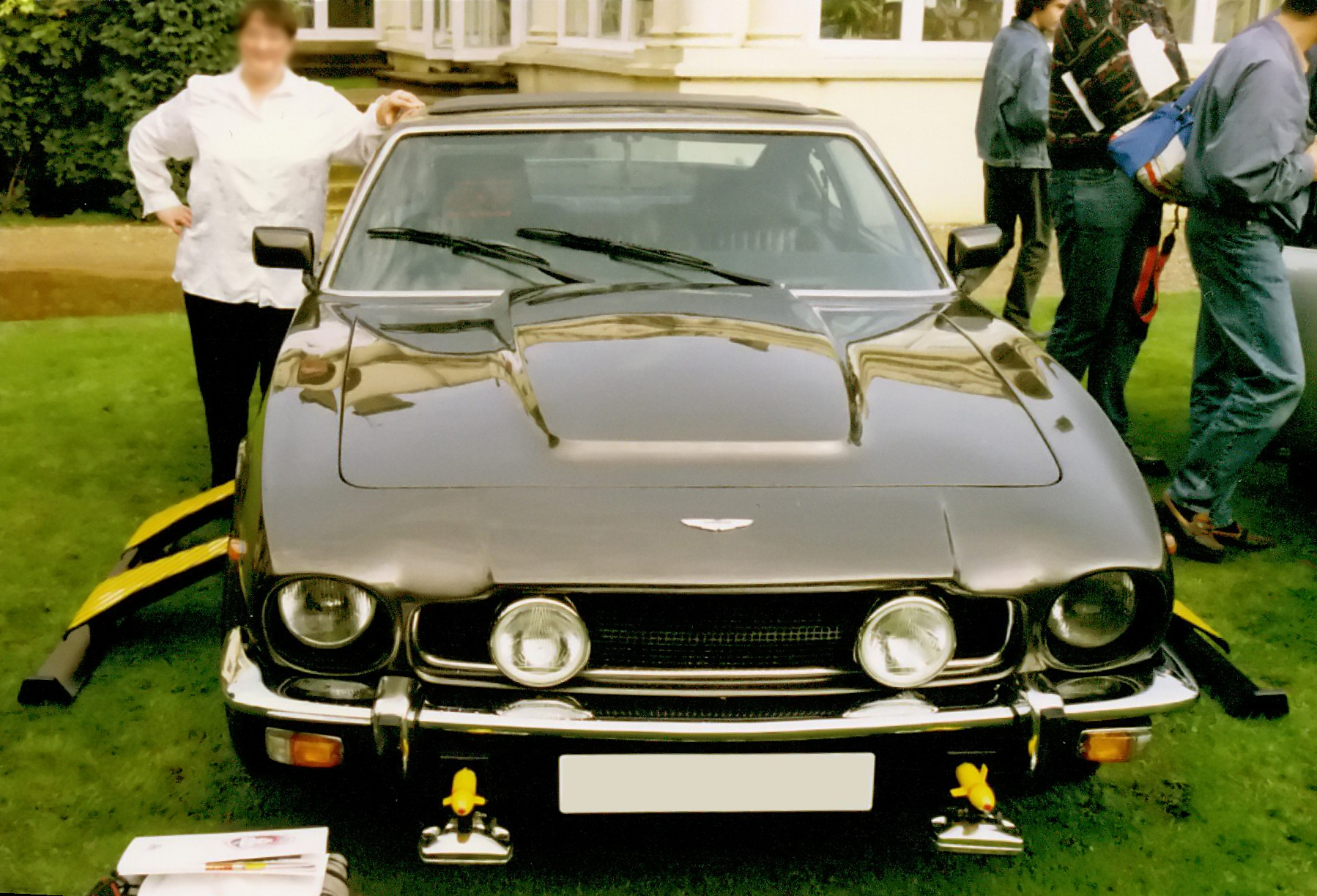
Aston Martin V8 Vantage from The Living Daylights

As trading became tighter in the petroleum market, and Aston Martin was requiring more time and money, Gauntlett agreed to sell Hays/Pace to the Kuwait Investment Office in September 1983. As Aston Martin required greater investment, he also agreed to sell his share holding to American importer and Greek shipping tycoon Peter Livanos, who invested via his joint venture with Nick and John Papanicolaou, ALL Inc. Gauntlett remained chairman of AML, 55% of the stake was owned by ALL, with Tickford a 50/50 venture between ALL and CHI. The uneasy relationship was ended when ALL exercised options to buy a larger share in AML; CHI's residual shares were exchanged for CHI's complete ownership of Tickford, which retained the development of existing Aston Martin projects. In 1984, Papanicolaou's Titan shipping business was in trouble so Livanos's father George bought out the Papanicolaou's shares in ALL, while Gauntlett again became a shareholder with a 25% holding in AML. The deal valued Aston Martin/AML at £2 million, the year it built its 10,000th car.

Although as a result Aston Martin had to make 60 members of the workforce redundant, Gauntlett bought a stake in Italian styling house Zagato, and resurrected its collaboration with Aston Martin. In 1986, Gauntlett negotiated the return of the fictional British secret agent James Bond to Aston Martin. Cubby Broccoli had chosen to recast the character using actor Timothy Dalton, in an attempt to re-root the Bond-brand back to a more Sean Connery-like feel. Gauntlett supplied his personal pre-production Vantage for use in the filming of The Living Daylights, and sold a Volante to Broccoli for use at his home in America. Gauntlett turned down the role of a KGB colonel in the film, however: "I would have loved to have done it but really could not afford the time."

=== 1987–2007: Ford Motor Company ===
As Aston Martin needed funds to survive in the long term, Ford bought a 75% stake in the company in 1987, and bought the rest later. In May of that year, Victor Gauntlett and Prince Michael of Kent were staying at the home of Contessa Maggi, the wife of the founder of the original Mille Miglia, while watching the revival event. Another house guest was Walter Hayes, vice-president of Ford of Europe. Despite problems over the previous acquisition of AC Cars, Hayes saw the potential of the brand and the discussion resulted in Ford taking a share holding in September 1987. In 1988, having produced some 5,000 cars in 20 years, a revived economy and successful sales of limited edition Vantage, and 52 Volante Zagato coupés at £86,000 each; Aston Martin finally retired the ancient V8 and introduced the Virage range.

Although Gauntlett was contractually to stay as chairman for two years, his racing interests took the company back into sports car racing in 1989 with limited European success. However, with engine rule changes for the 1990 season and the launch of the new Volante model, Ford provided the limited supply of Cosworth engines to the Jaguar cars racing team. As the entry-level DB7 would require a large engineering input, Ford agreed to take full control of Aston Martin, and Gauntlett handed over Aston Martin's chairmanship to Hayes in 1991. In 1992, the high-performance variant of the Virage called the Vantage was announced, and the following year Aston Martin renewed the DB range by announcing the DB7.

By 1993, Ford had fully acquired the company after having built a stake in 1987. Ford placed Aston Martin in the Premier Automotive Group, invested in new manufacturing and ramped up production. In 1994, Ford opened a new factory at Banbury Road in Bloxham to manufacture the DB7. In 1995, Aston Martin produced a record 700 cars. Until the Ford era, cars had been produced by hand coachbuilding craft methods, such as the English wheel. During the mid-1990s, the Special Projects Group, a secretive unit with Works Service at Newport Pagnell, created an array of special coach-built vehicles for the Brunei royal family. In 1998, the 2,000th DB7 was built, and in 2002, the 6,000th, exceeding production of all of the previous DB series models. The DB7 range was revamped by the addition of more powerful V12 Vantage models in 1999, and in 2001, Aston Martin introduced the V12-engined flagship model called the Vanquish which succeeded the aging Virage (now called the V8 Coupé).

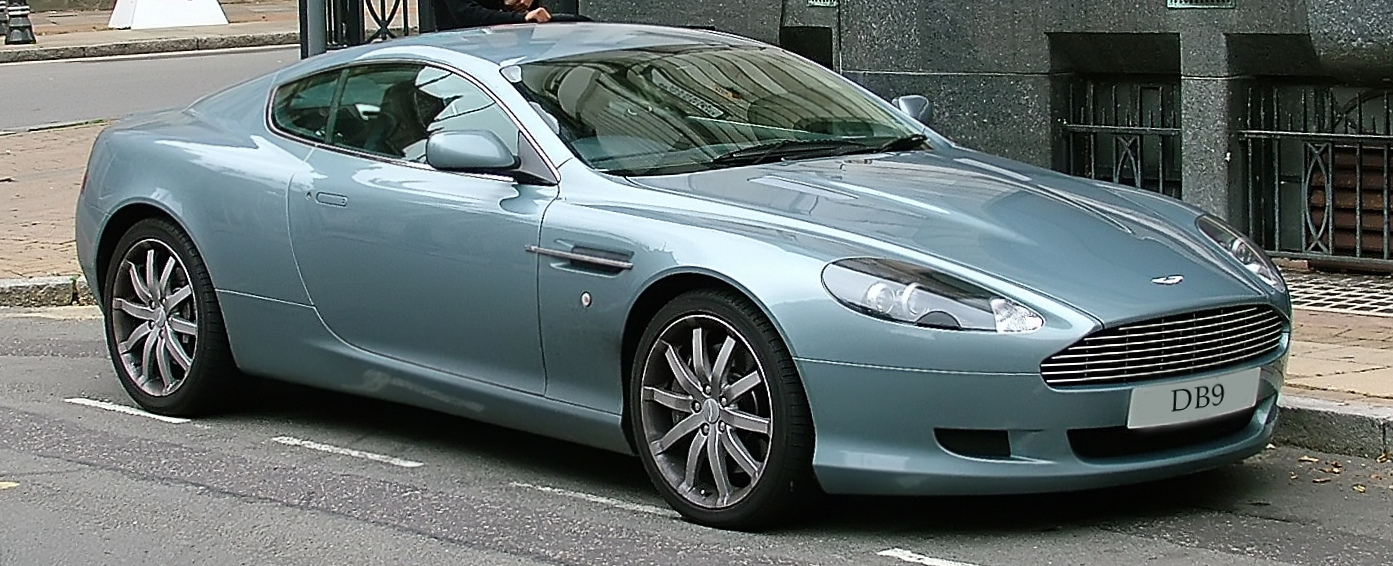
The DB9 was the first car to use the "vertical/horizontal" platform.

At the North American International Auto Show in Detroit, Michigan in 2003, Aston Martin introduced the V8 Vantage concept car. Expected to have few changes before its introduction in 2005, the Vantage brought back the classic V8 engine to allow Aston Martin to compete in a larger market. 2003 also saw the opening of the Gaydon factory, the first purpose-built factory in Aston Martin's history. The facility is situated on a 55-acre (22 ha) site of a former RAF V Bomber airbase, with an 8,000 m^{2} (86,000 sq ft) front building for offices, meeting rooms and customer reception, and a 35,000 m^{2} (380,000 sq ft) production building. Also introduced in 2003 was the DB9 coupé, which replaced the ten-year-old DB7. A convertible version of the DB9, the DB9 Volante, was introduced at the 2004 Detroit auto show.

In October 2004, Aston Martin set up the dedicated 12,500 m^{2} (135,000 sq ft) Aston Martin Engine Plant (AMEP) within the Ford Germany plant in Niehl, Cologne. With the capacity to produce up to 5,000 engines a year by 100 specially trained personnel, like traditional Aston Martin engine production from Newport Pagnell, assembly of each unit was entrusted to a single technician from a pool of 30, with V8 and V12 variants assembled in under 20 hours. By bringing engine production back to within Aston Martin, the promise was that Aston Martin would be able to produce small runs of higher performance variants' engines. This expanded engine capacity allowed the entry-level V8 Vantage sports car to enter production at the Gaydon factory in 2006, joining the DB9 and DB9 Volante.

In December 2003, Aston Martin announced it would return to motor racing in 2005. A new division was created, called Aston Martin Racing, which became responsible, together with Prodrive, for the design, development, and management of the DBR9 program. The DBR9 competes in the GT class in sports car races, including the world-famous 24 Hours of Le Mans.

In 2006, an internal audit led Ford to consider divesting itself of parts of its Premier Automotive Group. After suggestions of selling Jaguar Cars, Land Rover, or Volvo Cars were weighed, Ford announced in August 2006 it had engaged UBS AG to sell all or part of Aston Martin at auction.

=== 2007–2018: Private limited company ===
On 12 March 2007, a consortium led by Prodrive chairman David Richards purchased Aston Martin for £475 million (US$848 million). The group included American investment banker John Sinders and two Kuwaiti companies namely Investment Dar and Adeem Investment. Prodrive had no financial involvement in the deal. Ford kept a stake in Aston Martin valued at £40 million (US$70 million).

To demonstrate the V8 Vantage's durability across hazardous terrain and promote the car in China, the first east–west crossing of the Asian Highway was undertaken between June and August 2007. A pair of Britons drove 12,089 km (7,512 miles) from Tokyo to Istanbul before joining the European motorway network for another 3,259 km (2,025 miles) to London. The promotion was so successful Aston Martin opened dealerships in Shanghai and Beijing within three months.

On 19 July 2007, the Newport Pagnell plant rolled out the last of nearly 13,000 cars made there since 1955, a Vanquish S. The Tickford Street facility was converted and became the home of the Aston Martin Works classic car department which focuses on heritage sales, service, spares and restoration operations. UK production was subsequently concentrated on the 55-acre (22 ha) facility in Gaydon on the former RAF V Bomber airbase. In March 2008, Aston Martin announced a partnership with Magna Steyr to outsource manufacture of over 2,000 cars annually to Graz, Austria, reassuringly stating: "The continuing growth and success of Aston Martin is based upon Gaydon as the focal point and heart of the business, with the design and engineering of all Aston Martin products continuing to be carried out there."

More dealers in Europe and the new pair in China brought the total to 120 in 28 countries. On 1 September 2008, Aston Martin announced the revival of the Lagonda marque, proposing a concept car to be shown in 2009 to coincide with the brand's 100th anniversary. The first production cars were slated for production in 2012. In December 2008, Aston Martin announced it would cut its workforce from 1,850 to 1,250 due to the economic recession.

The first four-door Rapide grand tourers rolled out of the Magna Steyr factory in Graz, Austria, in 2010. The contract manufacturer provides dedicated facilities to ensure compliance with the exacting standards of Aston Martin and other marques, including Mercedes-Benz. Then CEO of the company, Ulrich Bez had publicly speculated about outsourcing all of Aston Martin's operations with the exception of marketing. In September 2011, it was announced that production of the Rapide would be returned to Gaydon in the second half of 2012, restoring all of the company's automobile manufacture there.

Italian private equity fund Investindustrial signed a deal on 6 December 2012 to buy a 37.5% stake in Aston Martin, investing £150 million as a capital increase. This was confirmed by Aston Martin in a press release on 7 December 2012. David Richards left Aston Martin in 2013, returning to concentrate on Prodrive.

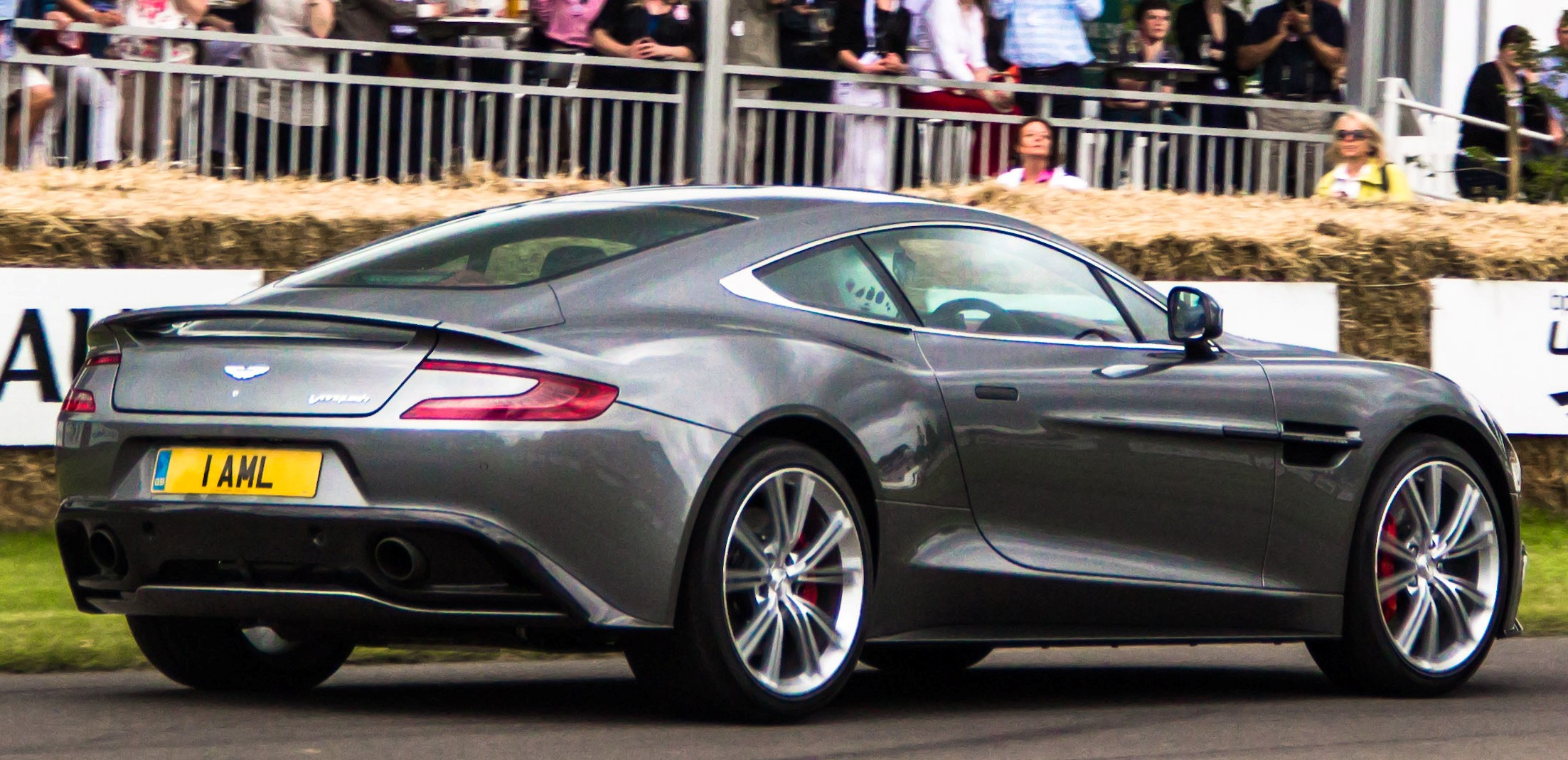
2012 Aston Martin Vanquish

In April 2013, it was reported that Bez would be leaving his role as the chief executive officer to take up a more ambassadorial position. On 2 September 2014, Aston Martin announced it had appointed the Nissan executive Andy Palmer as the new CEO with Bez retaining a position as non-executive chairman. As sales had been declining from 2015, Aston Martin sought new customers (particularly wealthy female buyers) with introducing concept cars like the DBX SUV along with track focused cars like the Vulcan. According to Palmer, the troubles started when sales of the DB9 failed to generate sufficient fund to develop next-generation models which led to a downward spiral of declining sales and profitability.

Palmer outlined that the company plans to develop two new platforms, add a crossover, refresh its supercar lineup and leverage its technology alliance with Daimler as part of its six-year plan to make the 100-year-old British brand consistently profitable. He stated, "In the first century we went bankrupt seven times. The second century is about making sure that is not the case." In preparation for its next-generation of sports cars, the company invested £20 million ($33.4 million) to expand its manufacturing plant in Gaydon. The expansion at the Gaydon plant includes a new chassis and pilot build facility, as well as an extension of the parts and logistics storage area, and new offices. In total, Aston Martin will add approximately 10,000 m^{2} (110,000 sq ft) to the plant.

Aston Martin Lagonda Production & Technology Centre St Athan, Wales

In 2014, Aston Martin suffered a pre-tax loss of £72 million, almost triple of the amount of 2013 selling 3,500 cars during the year, well below the 7,300 cars sold in 2007 and 4,200 sold in 2013 respectively. In March 2014, Aston Martin issued "payment in kind" notes of US$165 million, at 10.25% interest, in addition to the £304 million of senior secured notes at 9.25% issued in 2011. Aston Martin also had to secure an additional investment of £200 million from its shareholders to fund development of new models. It was reported that Aston Martin's pre-tax losses for 2016 increased by 27% to £162.8 million, the sixth year it continued to suffer a loss.

In February 2016, the company selected a 90-acre (36 ha) site in St Athan, South Wales for its new factory. The Welsh facility was unanimously chosen by Aston's board despite fierce competition from other locations as far afield as the Americas, Europe, the Middle East, as well as other sites in the UK believed to be Bridgend, Birmingham, and Coventry. The facility featured three existing 'super-hangars' of MOD St Athan. Construction work of converting the hangars commenced in April 2017. Aston Martin returned to profit in 2017 after selling over 5,000 cars. The company made a pre-tax profit of £87 million compared with a £163 million loss in 2016. 2017 also marked the return of production of the Newport Pagnell facility ten years after it originally ceased.

=== 2013–present: Partnership with Mercedes-Benz Group ===
In December 2013, Aston Martin signed a deal with Mercedes-Benz Group (at the time known as Daimler) to supply the next generation of Aston Martin cars with Mercedes-AMG engines. Mercedes-AMG also was to supply Aston Martin with electrical systems. This technical partnership was intended to support Aston Martin's launch of a new generation of models that would incorporate new technology and engines. In exchange, Mercedes will get as much as 5% equity in Aston Martin and a non-voting seat on its board. The first model to sport the Mercedes-Benz technology was the DB11, announced at the 86th Geneva Motor Show in March 2016. It featured Mercedes-Benz electronics for the entertainment, navigation and other systems. It was also the first model to use Mercedes-AMG V8 engines. In October 2020, Mercedes confirmed it will increase its holding "in stages" from 5% to 20%. In return, Aston Martin will have access to Mercedes-Benz hybrid and electric drivetrain technologies for its future models.

=== 2018–present: Listed on the London Stock Exchange ===
After "completing a turnaround for the once perennially loss-making company that could now be valued at up to 5 billion pounds ($6.4 billion)," and now reporting a full-year pre-tax profit of £87 million (compared with a £163 million loss in 2016) Aston Martin in August 2018 announced plans to float the company at the London Stock Exchange as Aston Martin Lagonda Global Holdings plc. The company was the subject of an initial public offering on the London Stock Exchange on 3 October 2018. In the same year, Aston Martin opened a new vehicle dynamics test and development centre at Silverstone's Stowe Circuit alongside a new HQ in London. In June 2019, the company opened its new 90-acre (36 ha) factory in St Athan for the production of its first-ever SUV the DBX. The factory was finally completed and officially opened on 6 December 2019. When full production begins in the second quarter of 2020, around 600 people will be employed at the factory, rising to 750 when peak production is reached.

On 31 January 2020 it was announced that Canadian billionaire and investor Lawrence Stroll was leading a consortium, Yew Tree Overseas Limited, who will pay £182 million in return for 16.7% stake in the company. The re-structuring includes a £318 million cash infusion through a new rights issue, generating a total of £500 million for the company. Stroll will also be named as chairman, replacing Penny Hughes. Swiss pharmaceutical magnate Ernesto Bertarelli and Mercedes-AMG Petronas F1 team principal and CEO Toto Wolff have also joined the consortium, acquiring 3.4% and 4.8% stakes, respectively. In March 2020, Stroll increased his stake in the company to 25%.

On 26 May 2020, Aston Martin announced that Andy Palmer had stepped down as CEO. Tobias Moers of Mercedes-AMG will succeed him starting 1 August, with Keith Stanton as interim chief operating officer. In June 2020, the company announced that it cut out 500 jobs as a result of the poor sales, an outcome of the COVID-19 pandemic lockdown. In March 2021, executive chairman Lawrence Stroll stated that the company plans on building electric vehicles by 2025. In May 2022, Aston Martin named 76-year-old Amedeo Felisa as the new chief executive officer, replacing Tobias Moers. Roberto Fedeli was also announced as the new chief technical officer.

In late 2020, Aston Martin was involved in a controversy in which it was accused of using a report to spread disputed information about electric vehicles in the wake of the UK's declaration to end the sale of combustion engine vehicles by 2030, with some in the media dubbing the controversy as "Astongate". In November 2020, a communications agency called Clarendon Communications published a report comparing the environmental impact of various powertrain options for cars. After the report received coverage from The Sunday Times and other publications, it emerged that the company had been set up in February that year and was registered under the name of Rebecca Stephens – the wife of James Stephens, who is the government affairs director of Aston Martin Lagonda. Citing a study by Polestar, the report stated that electric vehicles would need to be driven 48,000 miles (77,000 km) before they would have lower overall CO_{2} emissions than a petrol car. This statement was disputed by electric vehicle researcher Auke Hoekstra, who argued that the report underestimated the emissions from combustion engine vehicles and did not consider the emissions from creating petrol. According to him, a typical EV would need to drive 16,000–18,000 miles (25,700–30,000 km) to offset the emissions from manufacture. Bosch and a number of other companies were also involved with the report.

In July 2022, Saudi Arabia's Public Investment Fund (PIF) will take a stake in the company through a £78 million equity placing as well as a £575 million separate rights issue, giving it two board seats in the company. After the rights issue, the Saudi fund will have a 16.7% stake in Aston Martin, behind the 18.3% holding by Stroll's Yew Tree consortium while the Mercedes-Benz Group will own 9.7%. In September 2022, Chinese automaker Geely acquired a 7.6% stake in the company. In December 2022, Stroll and the Yew Tree consortium increased their stake in the company to 28.29%. In May 2023, Geely increased its stake to 17%, becoming the third-largest shareholder after the Yew Tree consortium and the PIF.

In June 2023, Aston Martin signed an agreement with Lucid Motors after selecting it to help supply electric motors, powertrains, and battery systems for its upcoming range of fully electric cars. In return, Aston Martin will make cash payments and issue a 3.7 percent stake in its company to Lucid, worth $232 million in total. In September 2023, the Yew Tree consortium increased their stake by 3.27% to 26.23%. In October 2023, Aston Martin announced that it would compete in the FIA World Endurance Championship and IMSA SportsCar Championship in 2025. In April 2024, the company said it would push back production of its first electric vehicle to 2027. In March 2024, Aston Martin announced Adrian Hallmark as its new CEO beginning 1 October 2024, replacing Amedeo Felisa.

In September 2024, Aston Martin issued a profit warning, saying it had been hit by a fall in demand in China. In November 2024, Aston Martin issued another warning following a minor delay in the deliveries of their Valiant model. In response, they said they would issue new shares and debt totalling £210 million. In February 2025, CEO Adrian Hallmark announced the company would again push back production of its first electric vehicle to 2030. On 31 March 2025, the Yew Tree Consortium is set to inject an additional £52.5 million into the marque by purchasing 75 million shares at 70 pence per share, increasing its stake to 33%. The company will also sell shares in the Formula One racing team that it sponsors. In total, the two transactions will raise £125 million.

On 20 February 2026, Aston Martin announced it will sell the rights to use its name on the Aston Martin F1 Team for £50 million to bolster its finances due to facing tariff pressures and weak demand in North America and China. In May 2026, Aston Martin appointed former Lamborghini executive, Andrea Baldi as Chief Commercial Officer.

=== Sales at auction ===
In August 2017, a 1956 Aston Martin DBR1/1 sold at a Sotheby's auction at the Pebble Beach, California Concours d'Elegance for US$22,550,000, which made it the most expensive British car ever sold at an auction, according to Sotheby's. The car had previously been driven by Carroll Shelby and Stirling Moss. Other notable cars include a 1962 Aston Martin DB4 GT Zagato for US$14,300,000 in New York, and a 1963 Aston Martin DP215 for US$21,455,000 in August 2018.

== Models ==
=== Pre-war cars ===
- 1921–1925 Aston Martin Standard Sports
- 1927–1932 Aston Martin First Series
- 1929–1932 Aston Martin International
- 1932–1932 Aston Martin International Le Mans
- 1932–1934 Aston Martin Le Mans
- 1933–1934 Aston Martin 12/50 Standard
- 1934–1936 Aston Martin Mk II
- 1934–1936 Aston Martin Ulster
- 1936–1940 Aston Martin 2-litre Speed Models (23 built; the last 8 were fitted with C-type bodywork)
- 1937–1939 Aston Martin 15/98

=== Post-war cars ===
- 1948–1950 Aston Martin 2-Litre Sports (DB1)
- 1950–1953 Aston Martin DB2
- 1953–1957 Aston Martin DB2/4
- 1957–1959 Aston Martin DB Mark III
- 1958–1963 Aston Martin DB4
- 1961–1963 Aston Martin DB4 GT Zagato
- 1963–1965 Aston Martin DB5
- 1965–1966 Aston Martin Short Chassis Volante
- 1965–1969 Aston Martin DB6
- 1967–1972 Aston Martin DBS
- 1969–1989 Aston Martin V8
- 1977–1989 Aston Martin V8 Vantage
- 1986–1990 Aston Martin V8 Zagato
- 1989–1996 Aston Martin Virage
- 1989–2000 Aston Martin Virage
- 1993–2000 Aston Martin Vantage
- 1996–2000 Aston Martin V8 Coupe/V8 Volante
- 1993–2003 Aston Martin DB7
- 2001–2007 Aston Martin Vanquish
- 2002–2003 Aston Martin DB7 Zagato
- 2002–2004 Aston Martin DB AR1
- 2004–2016 Aston Martin DB9
- 2005–2018 Aston Martin V8 and V12 Vantage
- 2007–2012 Aston Martin DBS
- 2009–2012 Aston Martin One-77
- 2010–2020 Aston Martin Rapide
- 2011–2012 Aston Martin Virage
- 2011–2013 Aston Martin Cygnet (based on the Toyota iQ)
- 2012–2018 Aston Martin Vanquish
- 2015–2016 Aston Martin Vulcan
- 2016–2023 Aston Martin DB11
- 2018–2024 Aston Martin DBS Superleggera
- 2021–2024 Aston Martin Valkyrie
- 2018–present Aston Martin Vantage
- 2020–present Aston Martin DBX
- 2023–present Aston Martin DB12
- 2024–present Aston Martin Vanquish
- 2025–present Aston Martin Valhalla

=== Other ===
- 1944 Aston Martin Atom (concept)
- 1961–1964 Lagonda Rapide
- 1976–1989 Aston Martin Lagonda
- 1980 Aston Martin Bulldog (concept)
- 1993 Lagonda Vignale (concept)
- 2001 Aston Martin Twenty Twenty (Italdesign concept)
- 2007 Aston Martin V12 Vantage RS (concept)
- 2009 Aston Martin Lagonda SUV (concept)
- 2011–2013 Aston Martin V12 Zagato
- 2013 Aston Martin Rapide Bertone Jet 2+2 (concept)
- 2013 Aston Martin CC100 Speedster (concept)
- 2015 Aston Martin DB10 (concept)
- 2015–2016 Lagonda Taraf
- 2019 Aston Martin Lagonda All-Terrain (concept)
- 2019 Aston Martin Vanquish Vision (concept)
- 2019 Aston Martin DBS GT Zagato
- 2020 Aston Martin V12 Speedster
- 2021 Aston Martin Victor
- 2022 Aston Martin DBR22
- 2023 Aston Martin Valour
- 2024 Aston Martin Valiant
- 2026 Aston Martin Valen

=== Current models ===
- Aston Martin Vantage
- Aston Martin DB12
- Aston Martin Vanquish
- Aston Martin DBX
- Aston Martin Valhalla

== Gallery ==
Aston Martin models

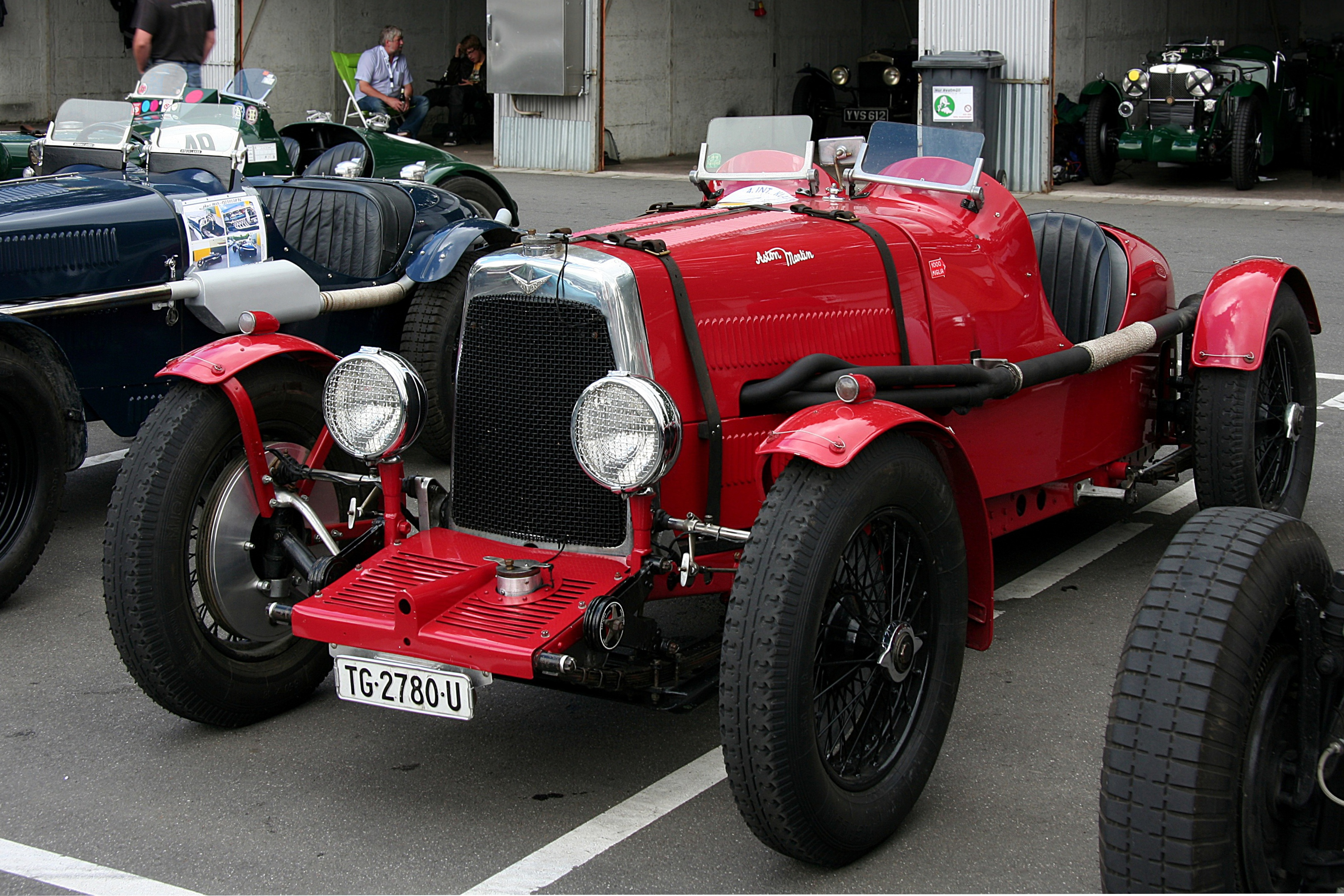
1930 Aston Martin1.5L International

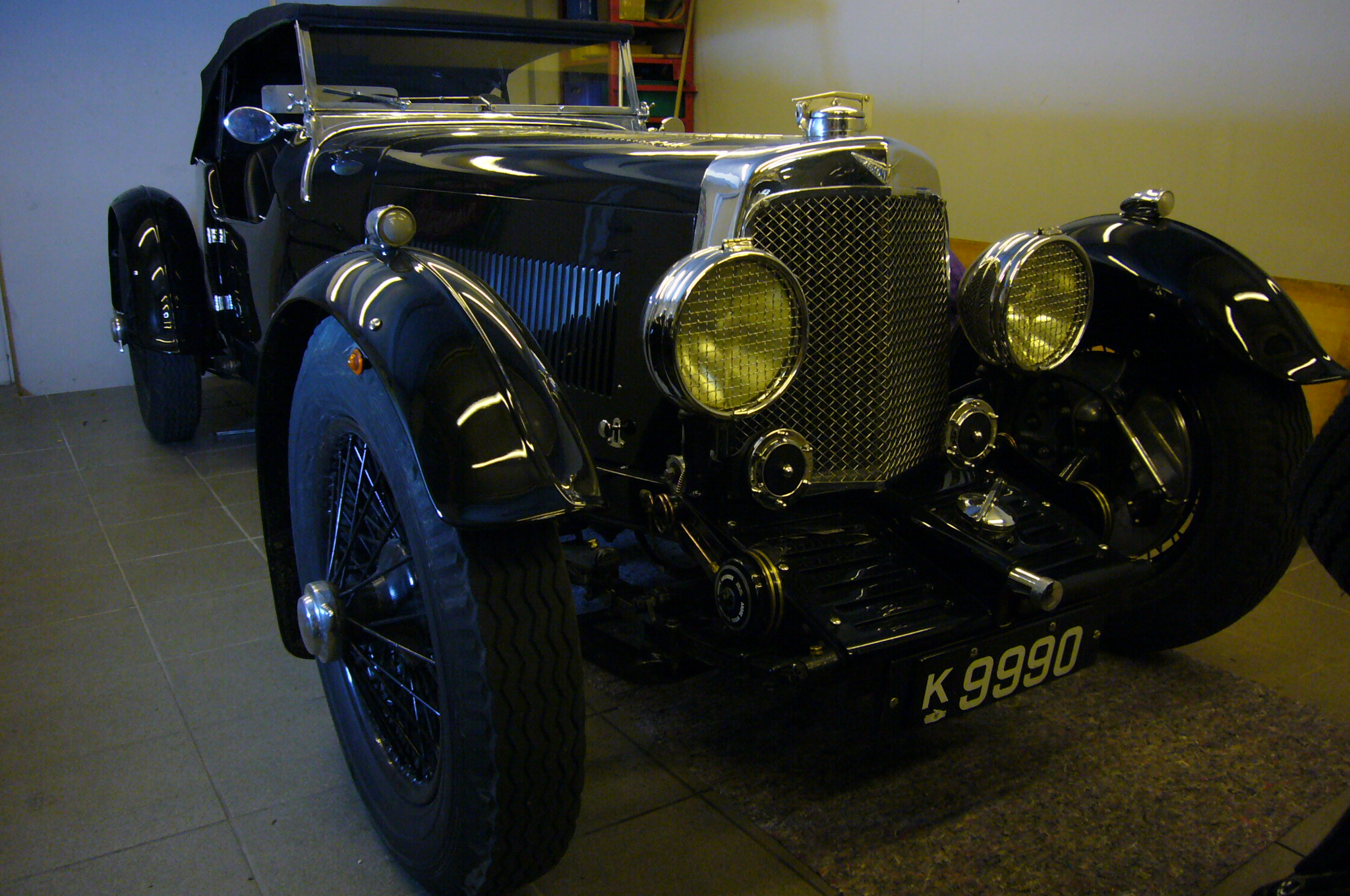
1932–1934 Aston Martin Le Mans short chassis

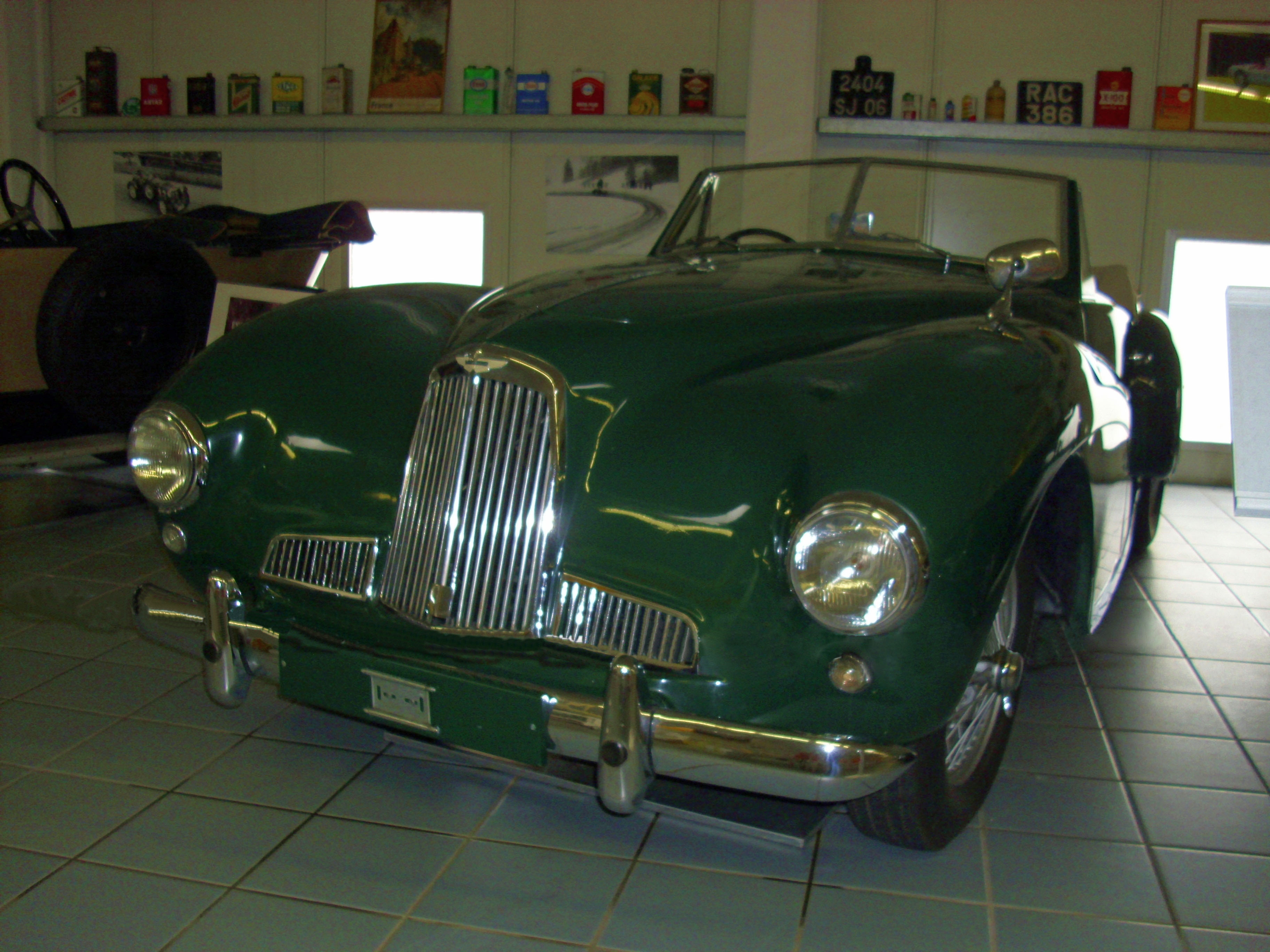
1948–1950 Aston Martin DB1

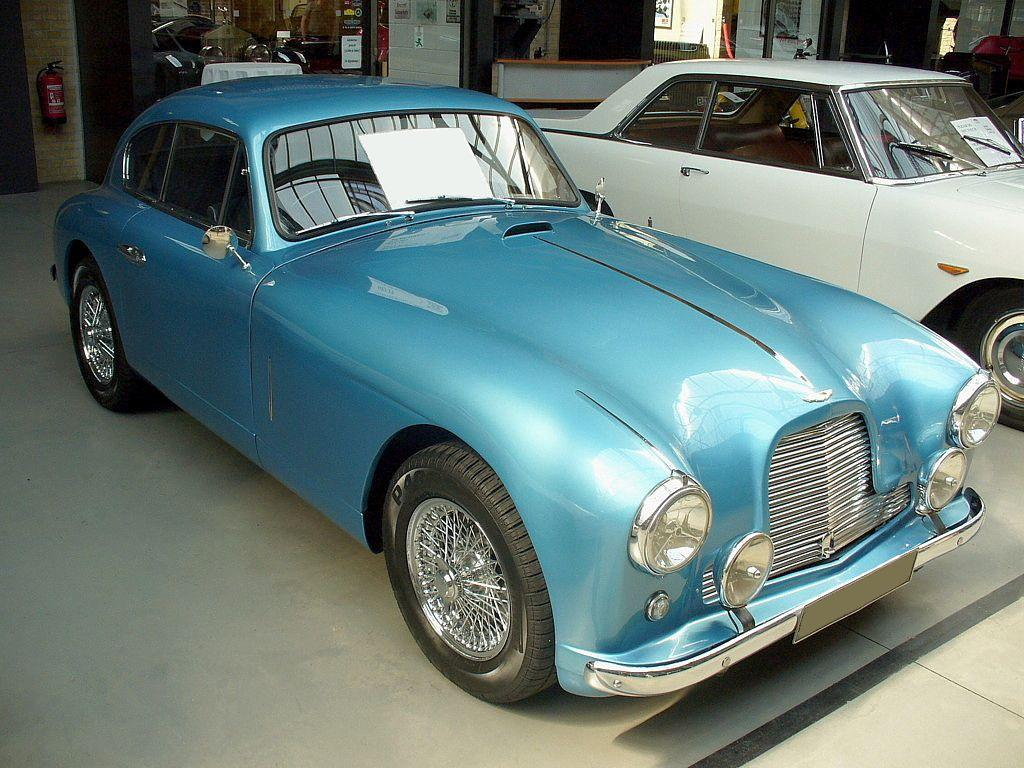
1950–1957 DB2 and later DB2/4

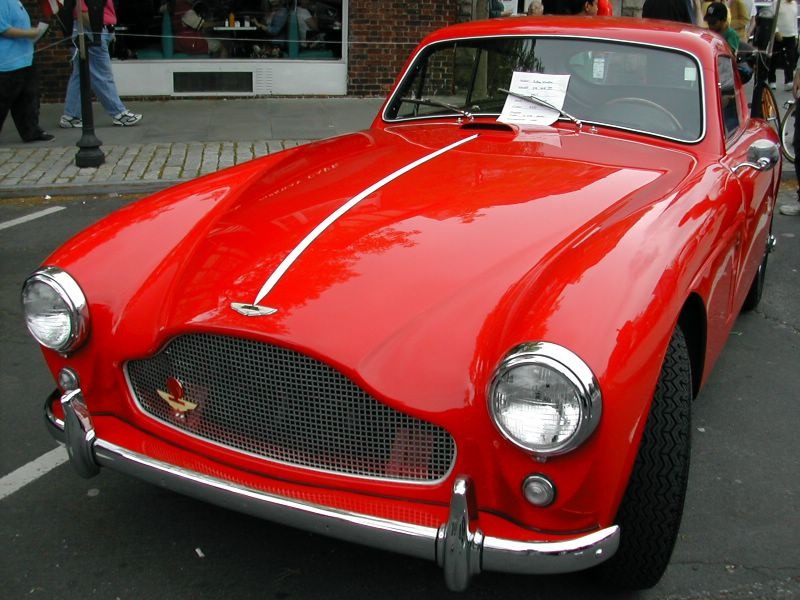
1957–1959 Aston Martin DB Mark III

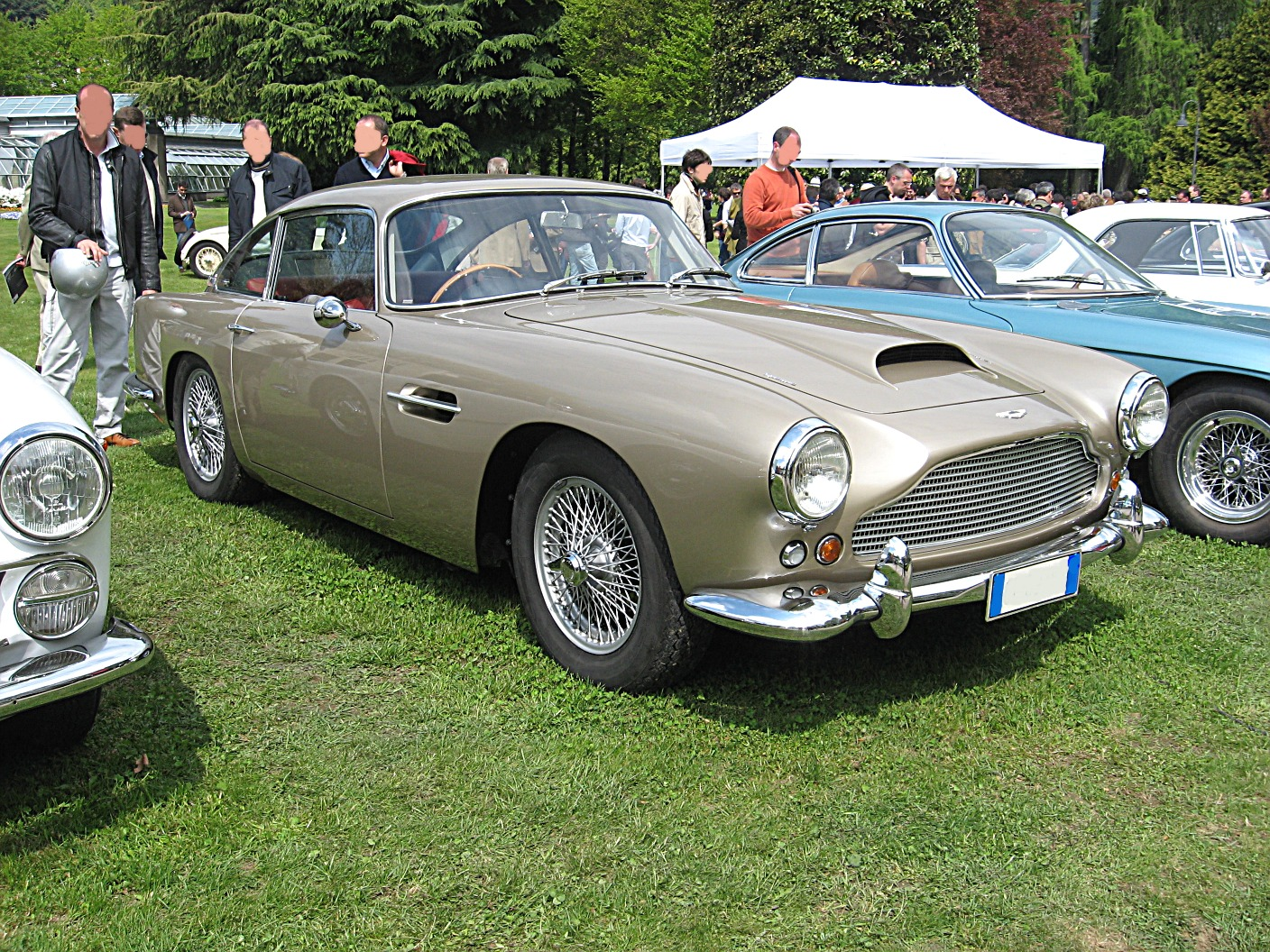
1958–1963 Aston Martin DB4/GT

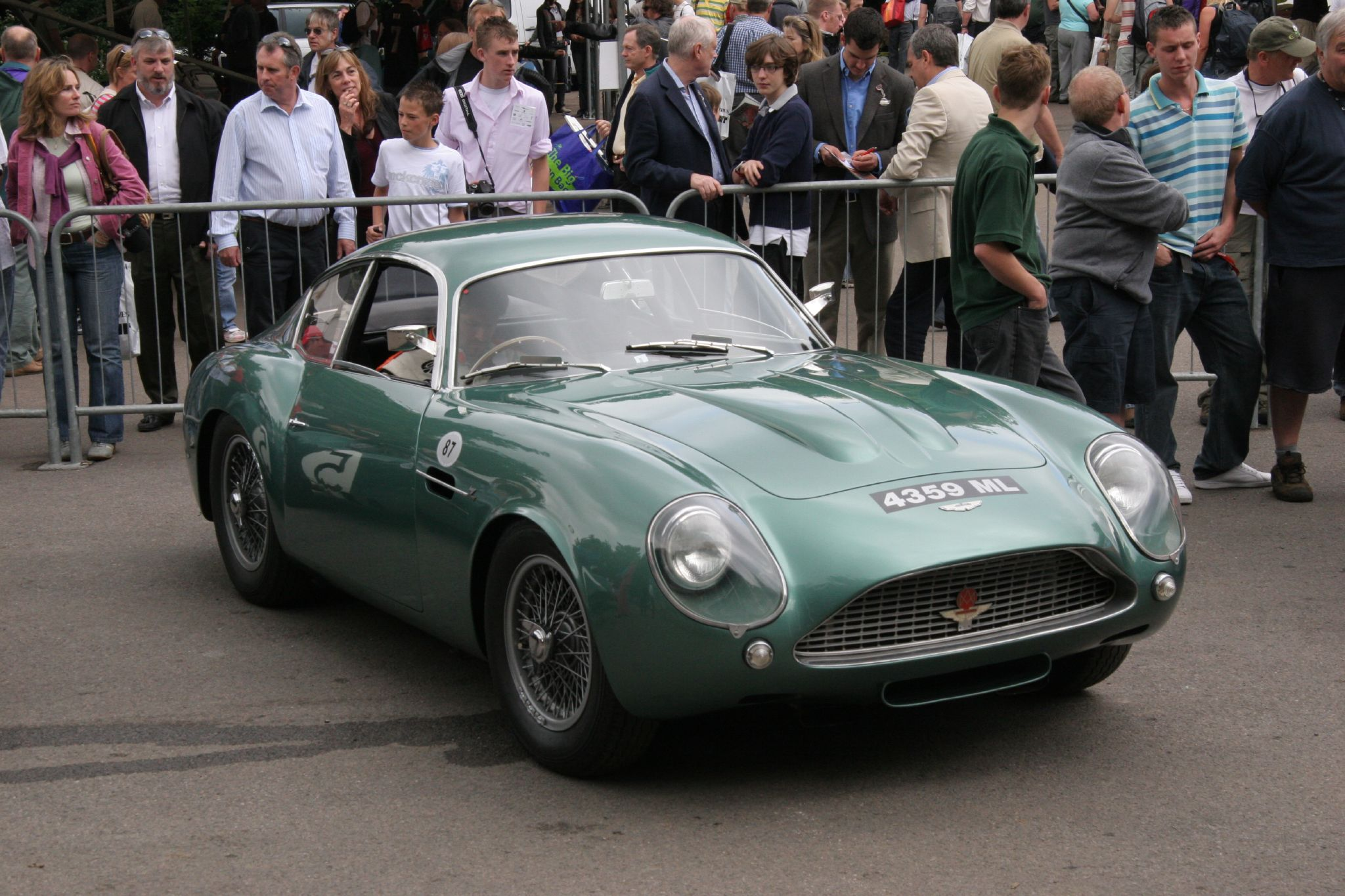
1961–1963 Aston Martin DB4 GT Zagato

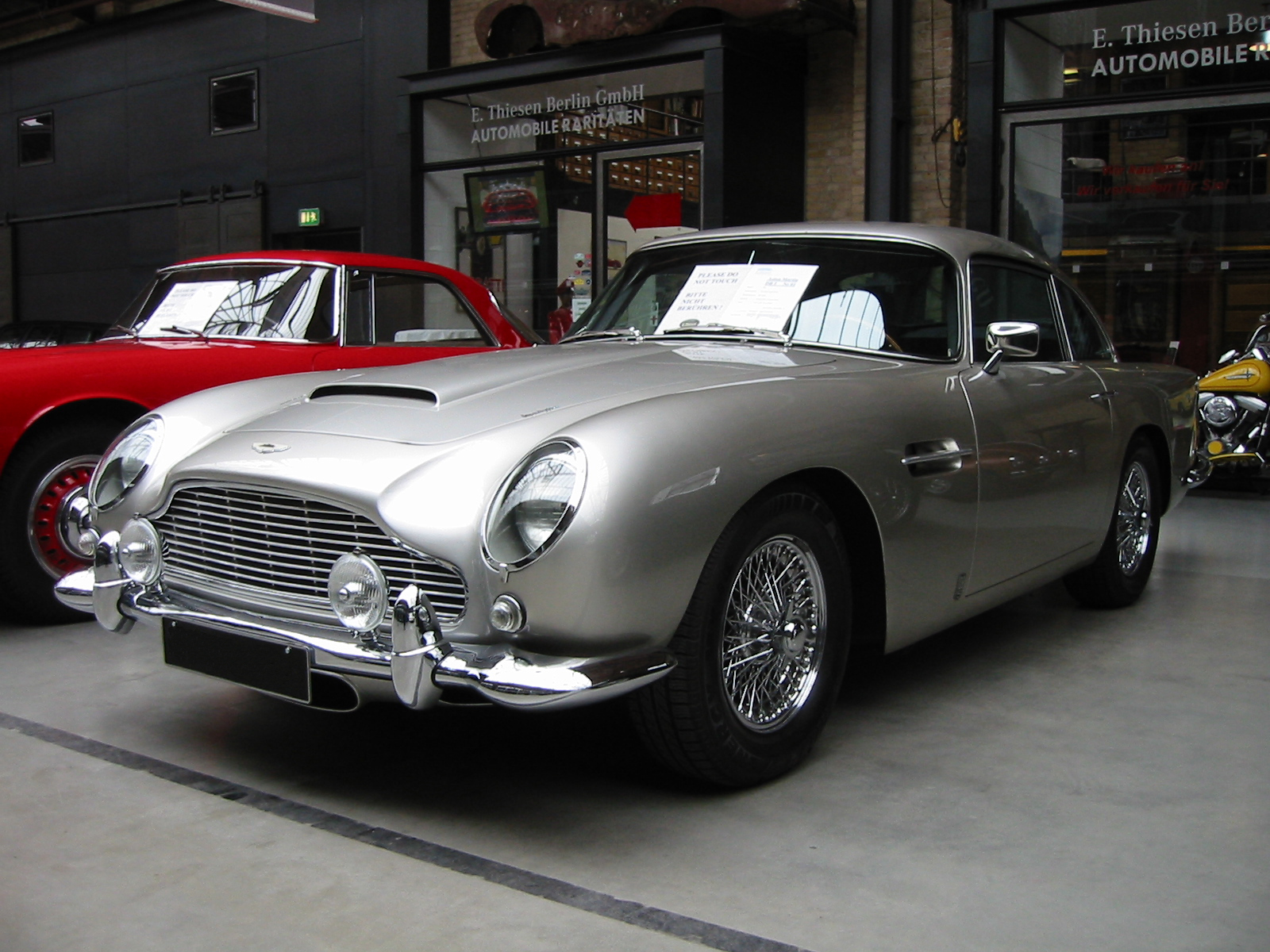
1963–1965 Aston Martin DB5

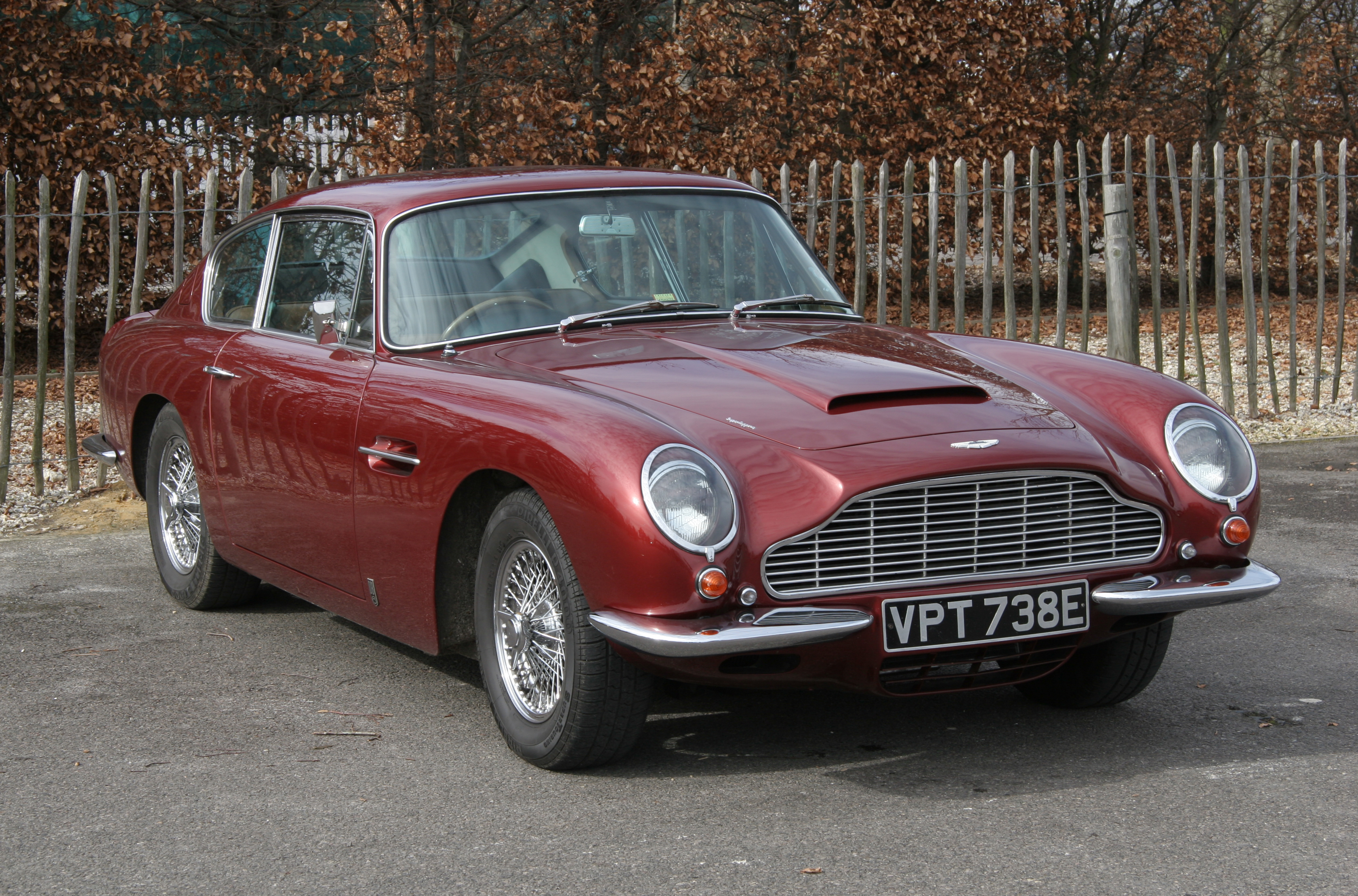
1965–1971 Aston Martin DB6

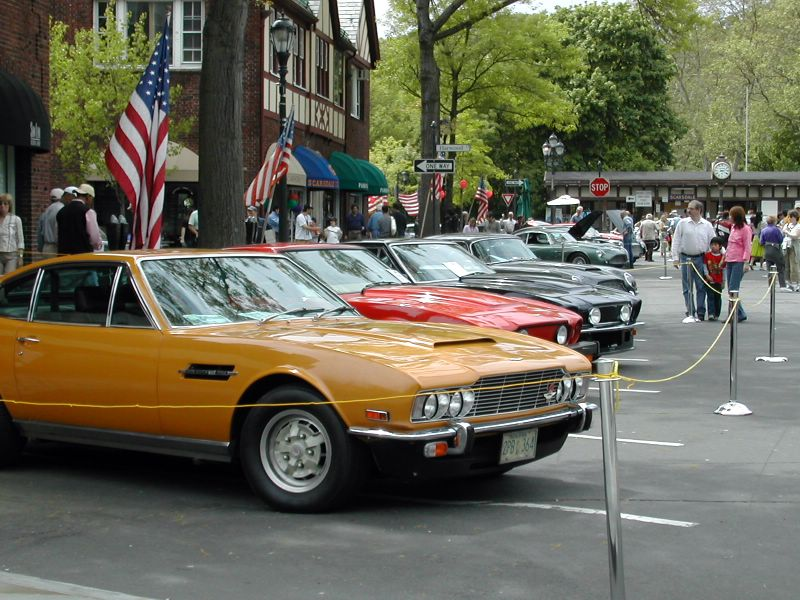
1967–1989 DBS and later V8s

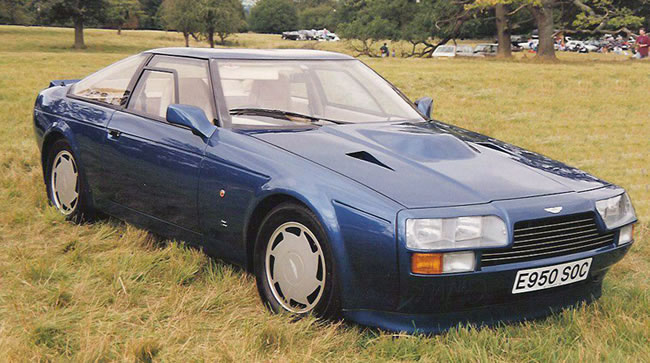
1986–1990 Aston Martin V8 Zagato

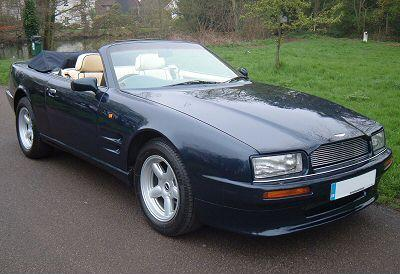
1989–2000 Virage/V8/Vantage

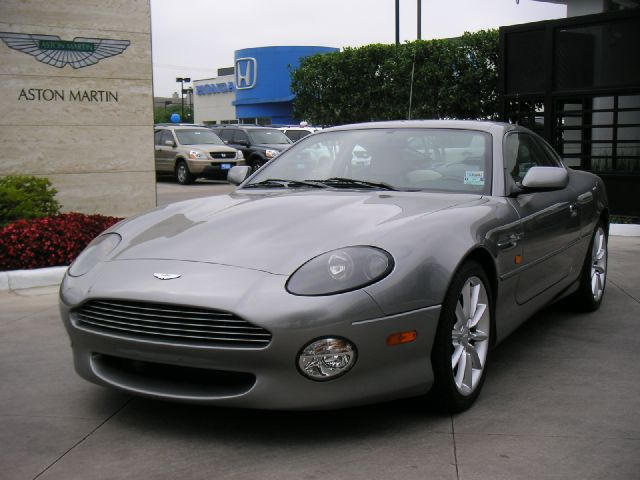
1993–2003 Aston Martin DB7/Vantage

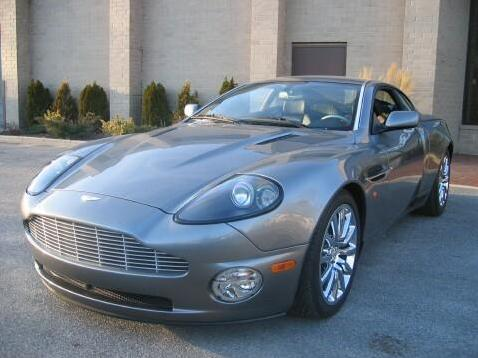
2001–2007 Aston Martin V12 Vanquish/S

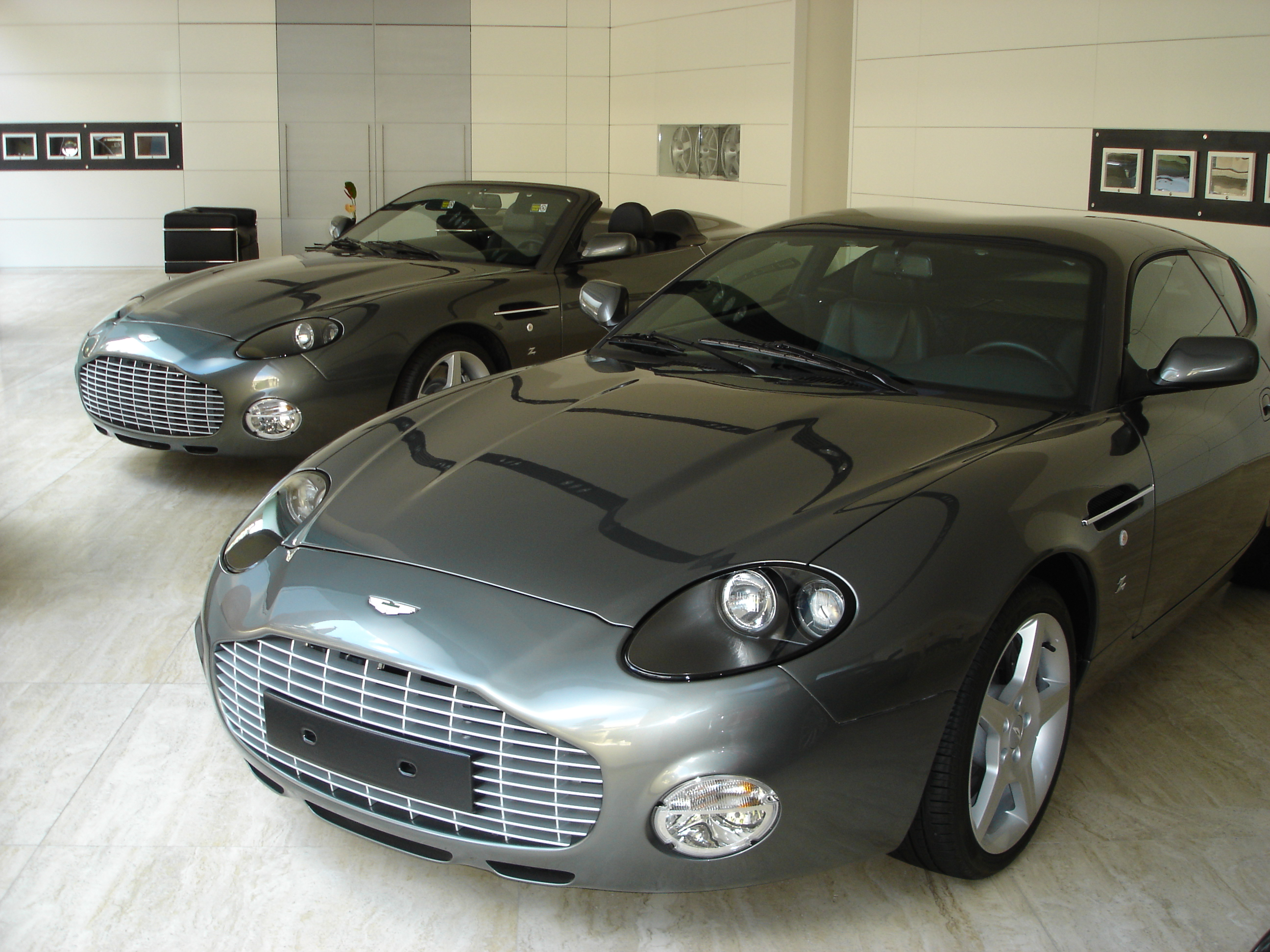
2002–2003 DB7 Zagato coupé/roadster

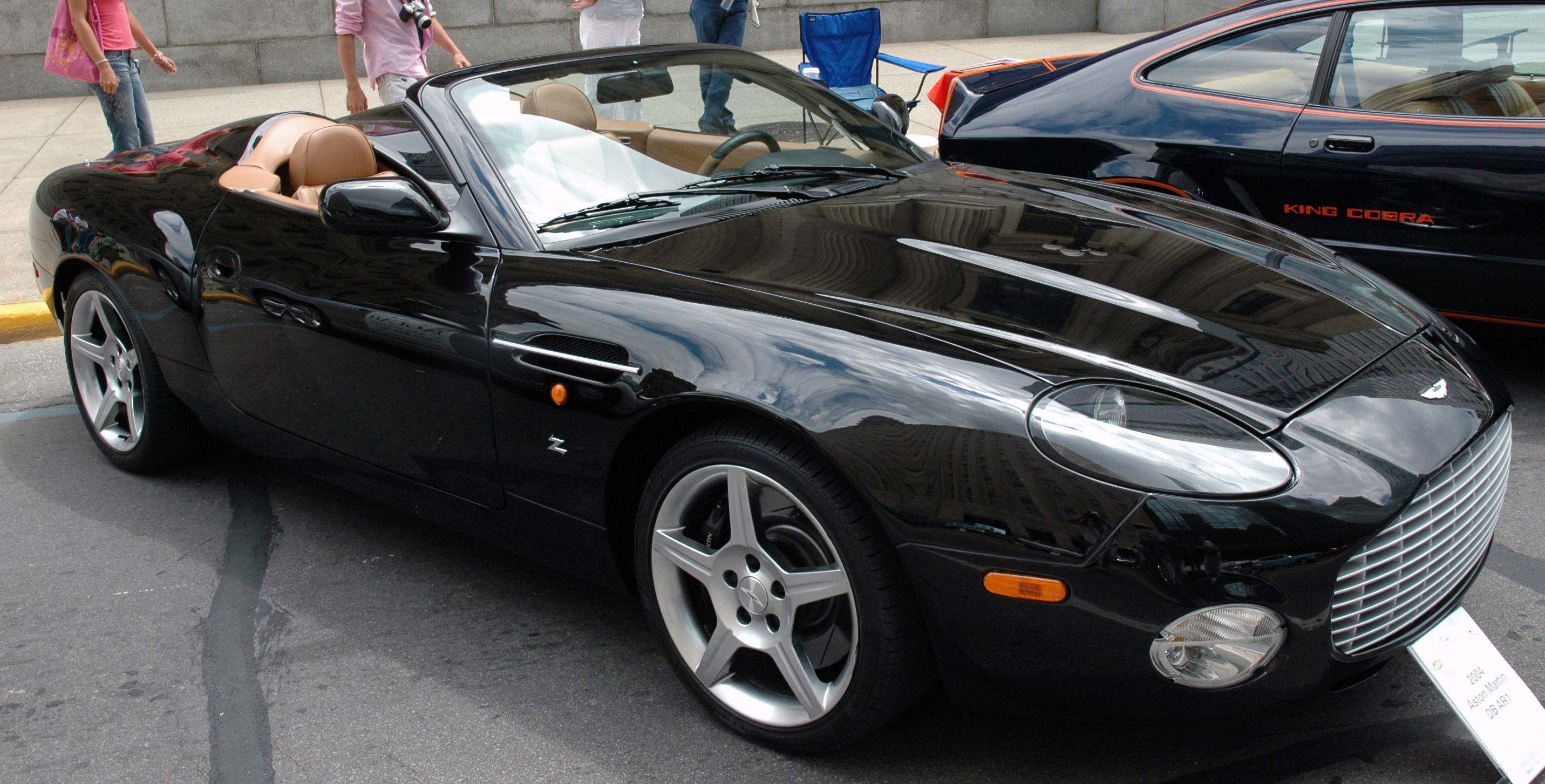
2002–2004 Aston Martin DB AR1 roadster

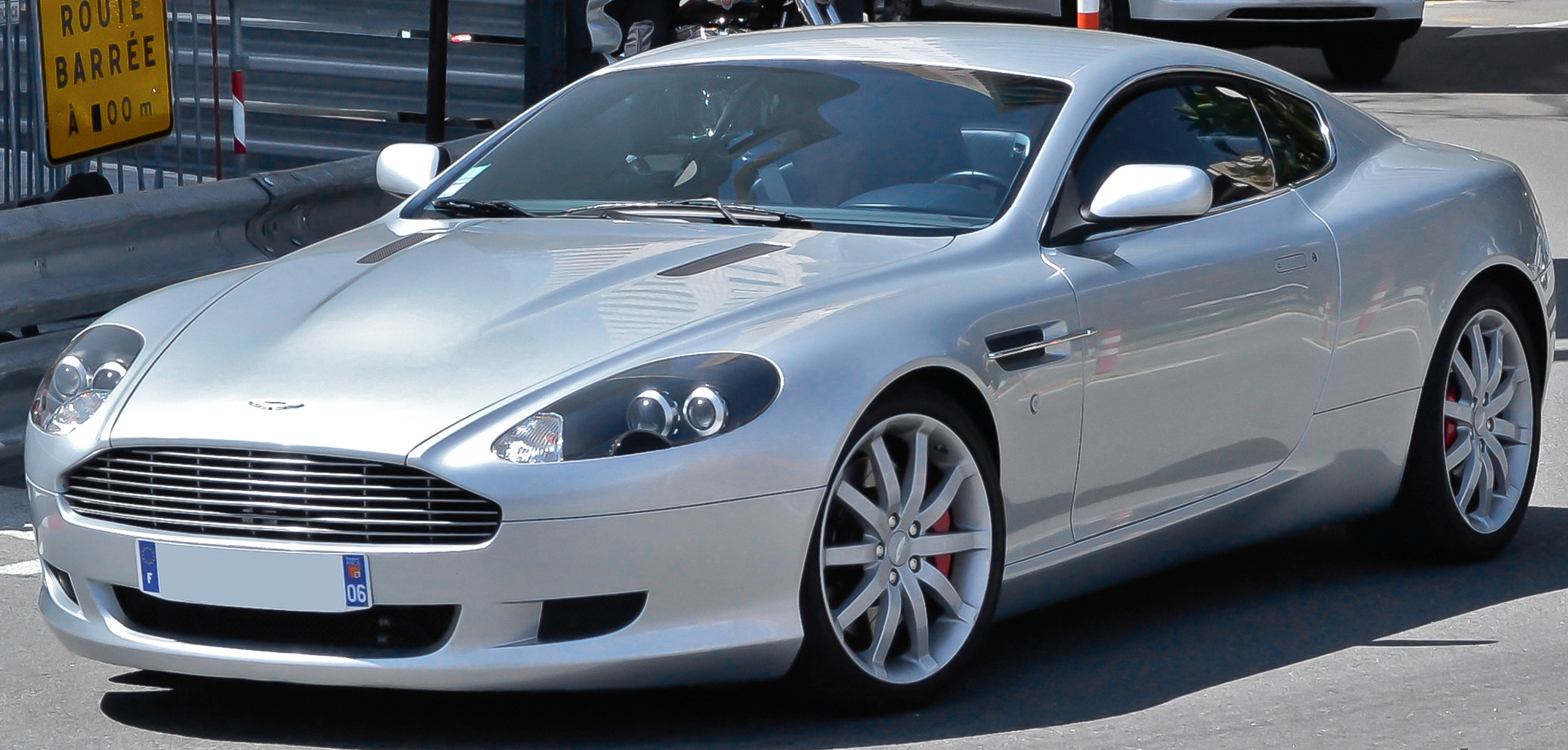
2003–2016 Aston Martin DB9 coupé/Volante

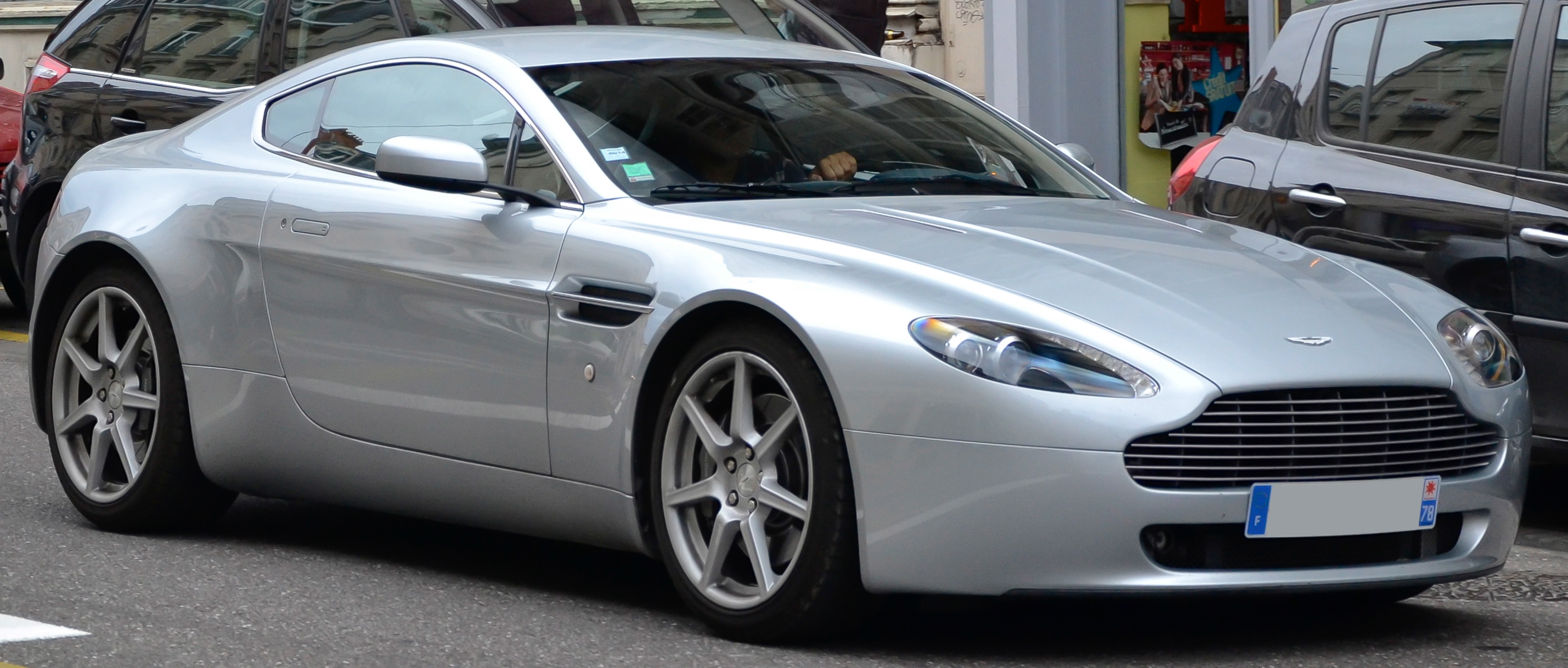
2005–2017 Aston Martin V8/V12 Vantage

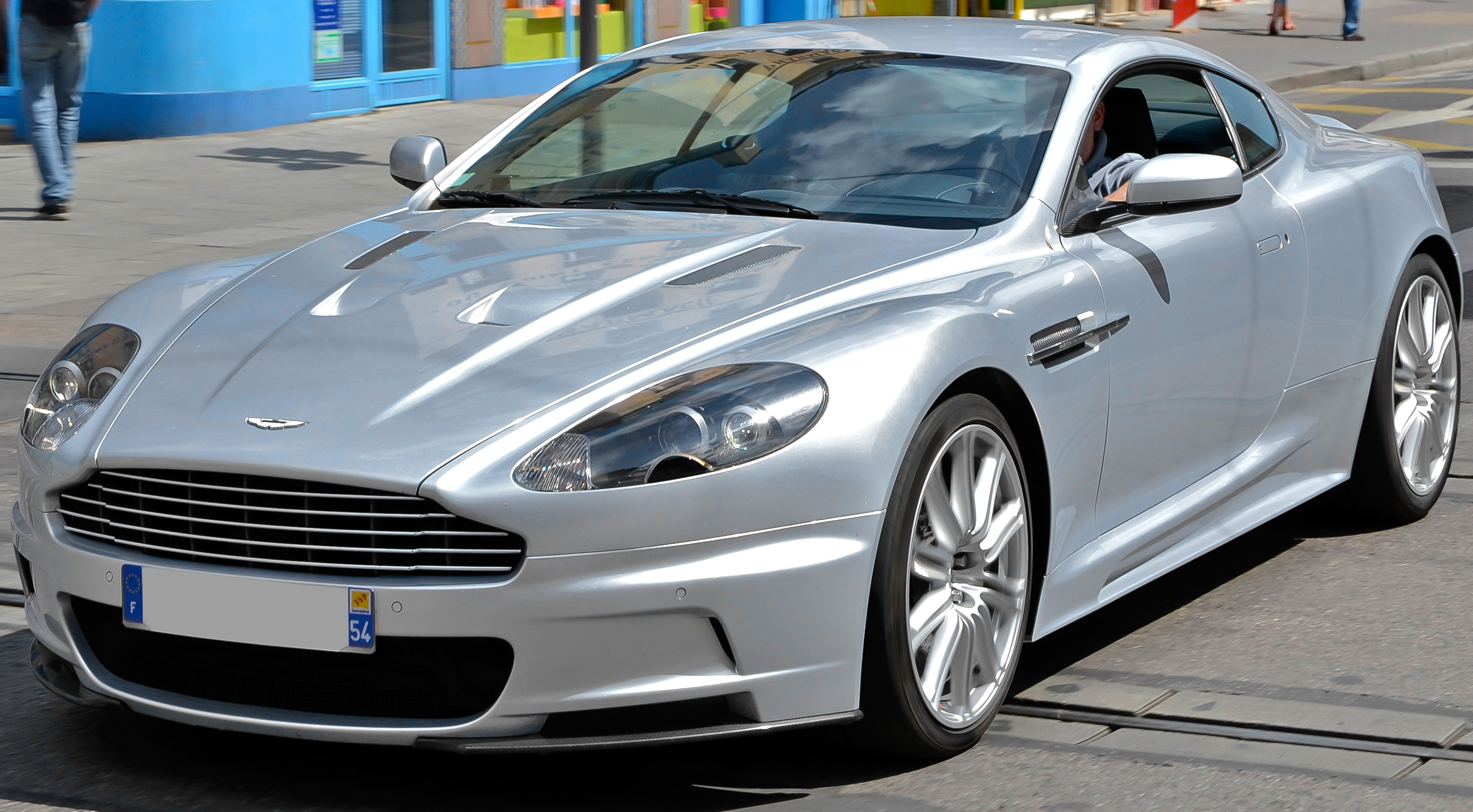
2007–2012 Aston Martin DBS

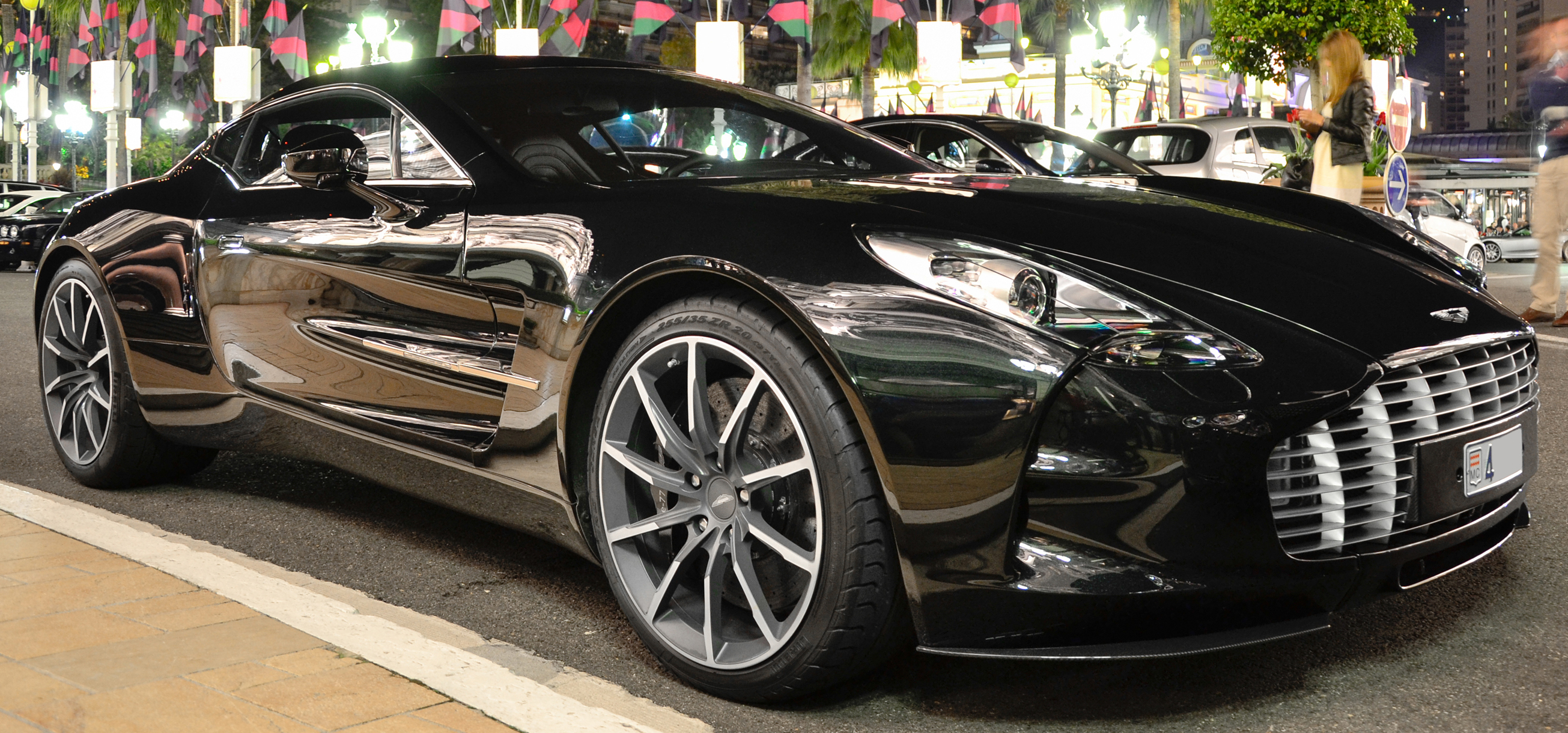
2009–2012 Aston Martin One-77

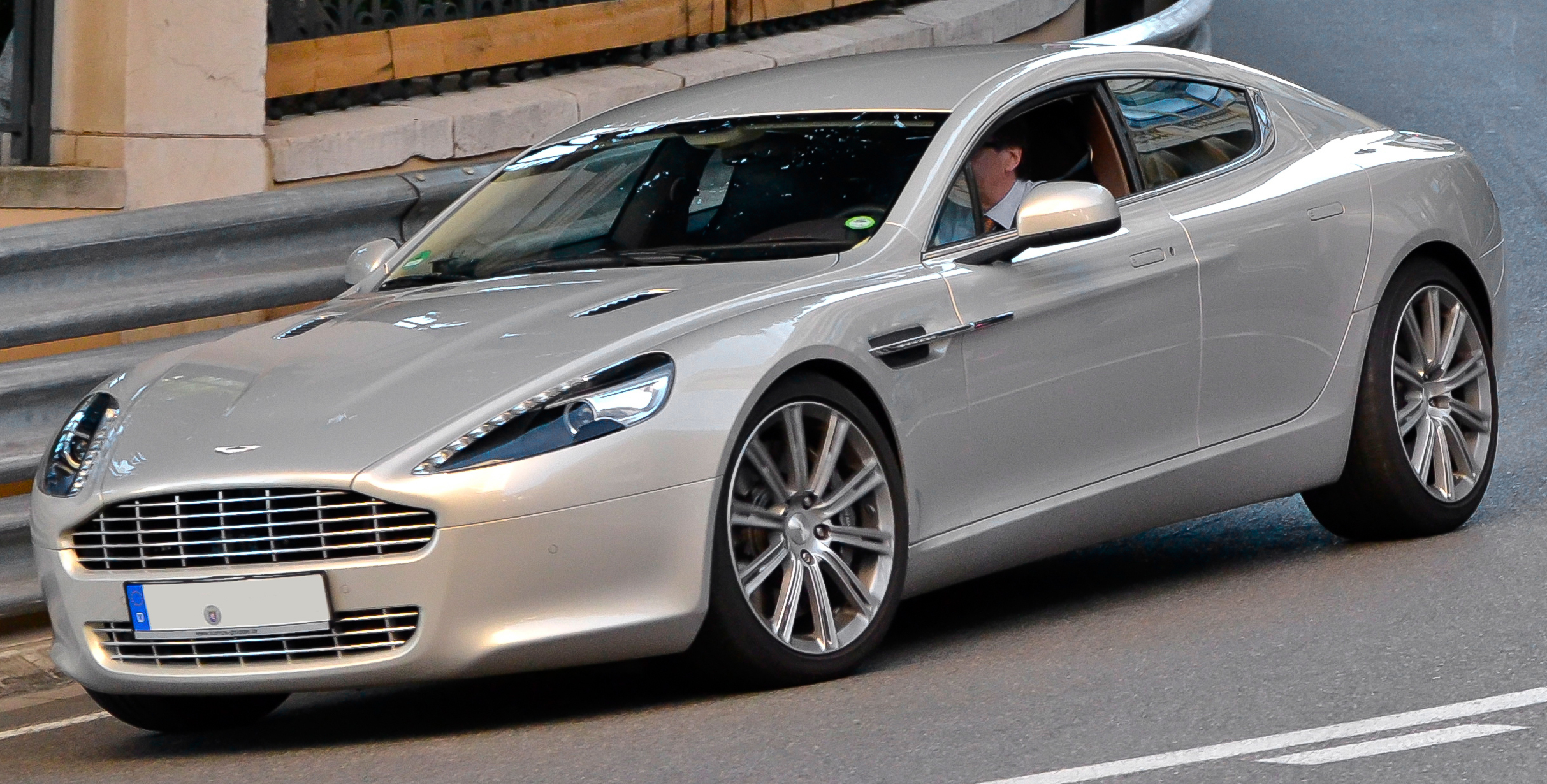
2010–2020 Aston Martin Rapide

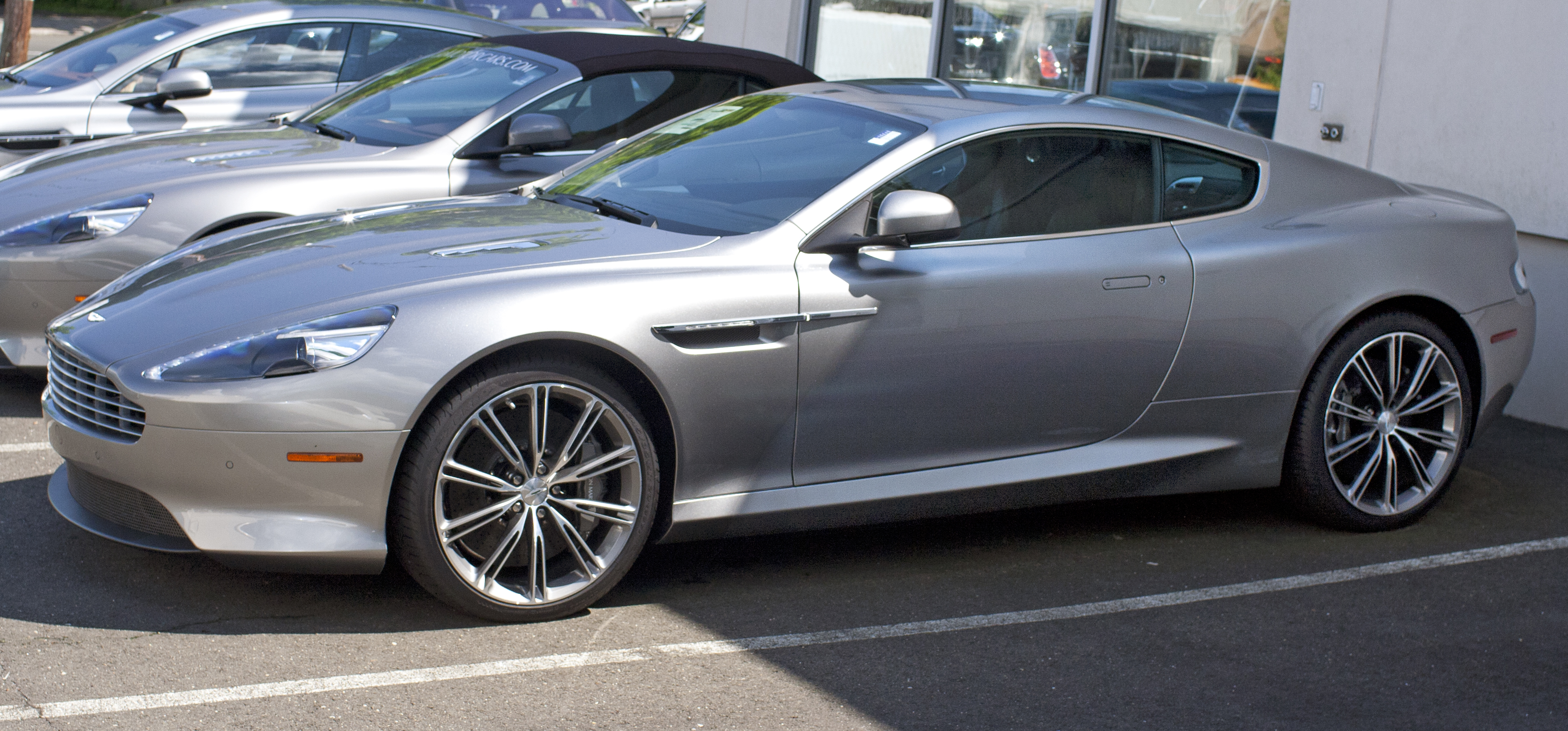
2011–2012 Aston Martin Virage

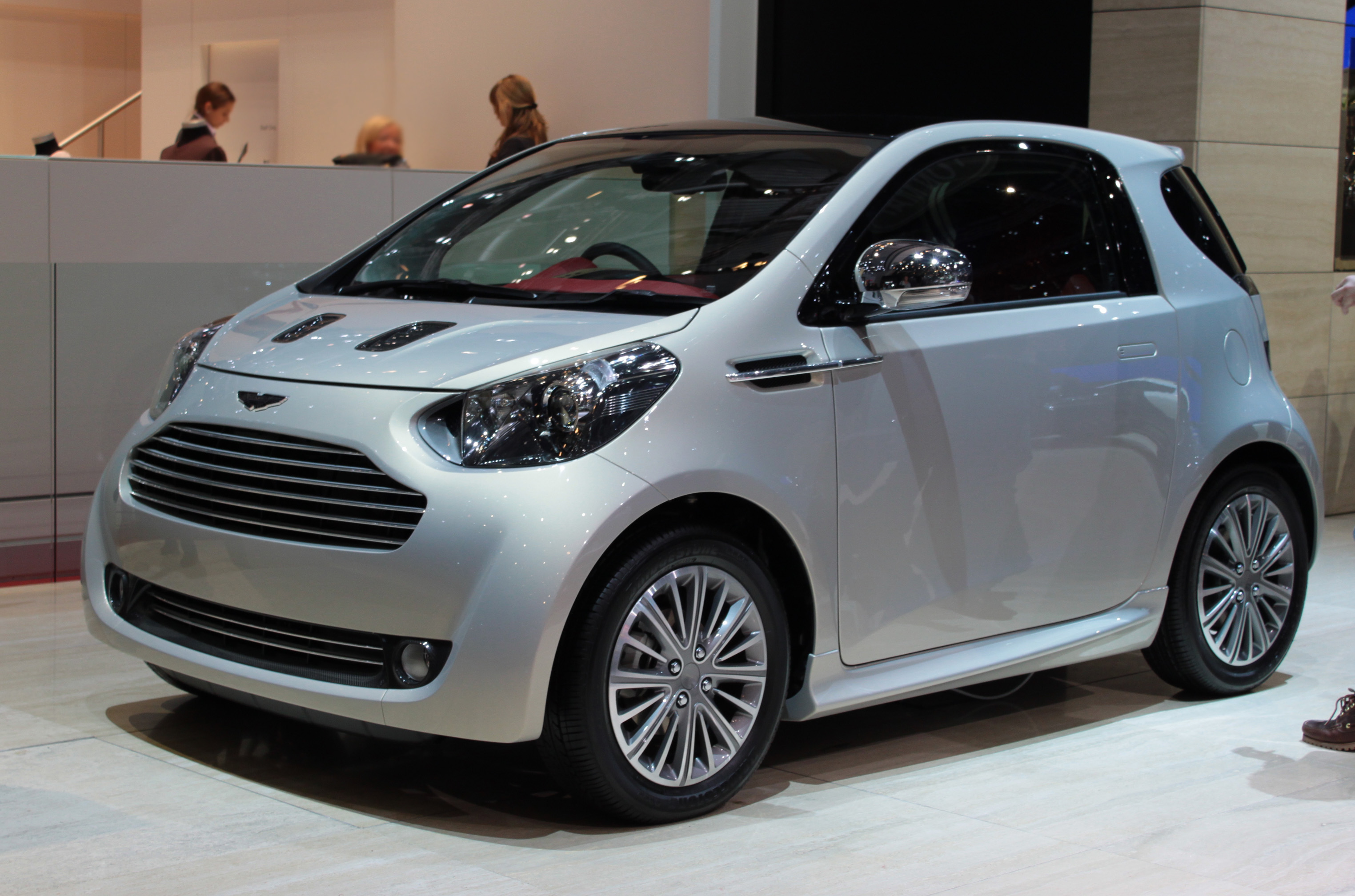
2011–2013 Aston Martin Cygnet

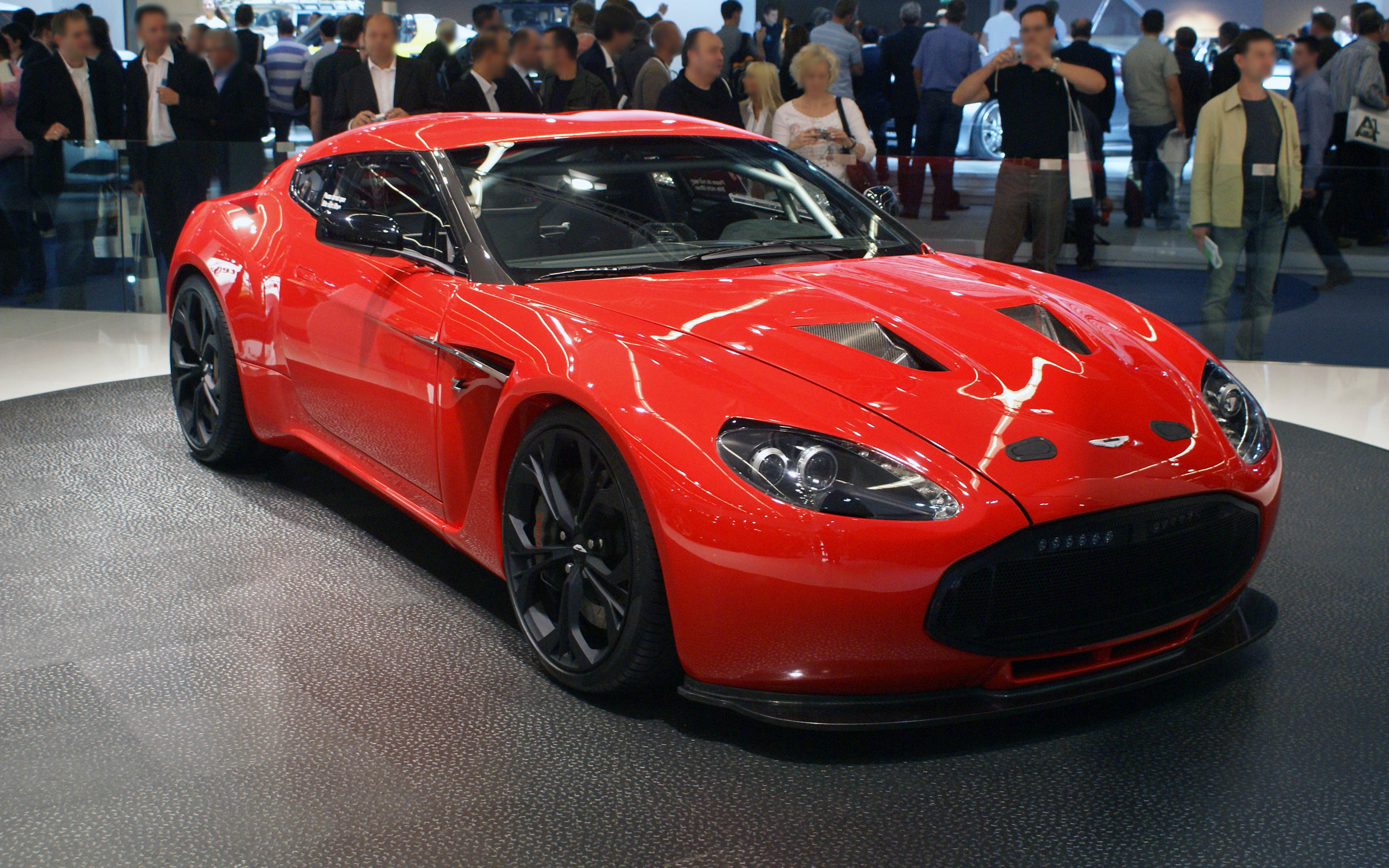
2011–2013 Aston Martin V12 Zagato

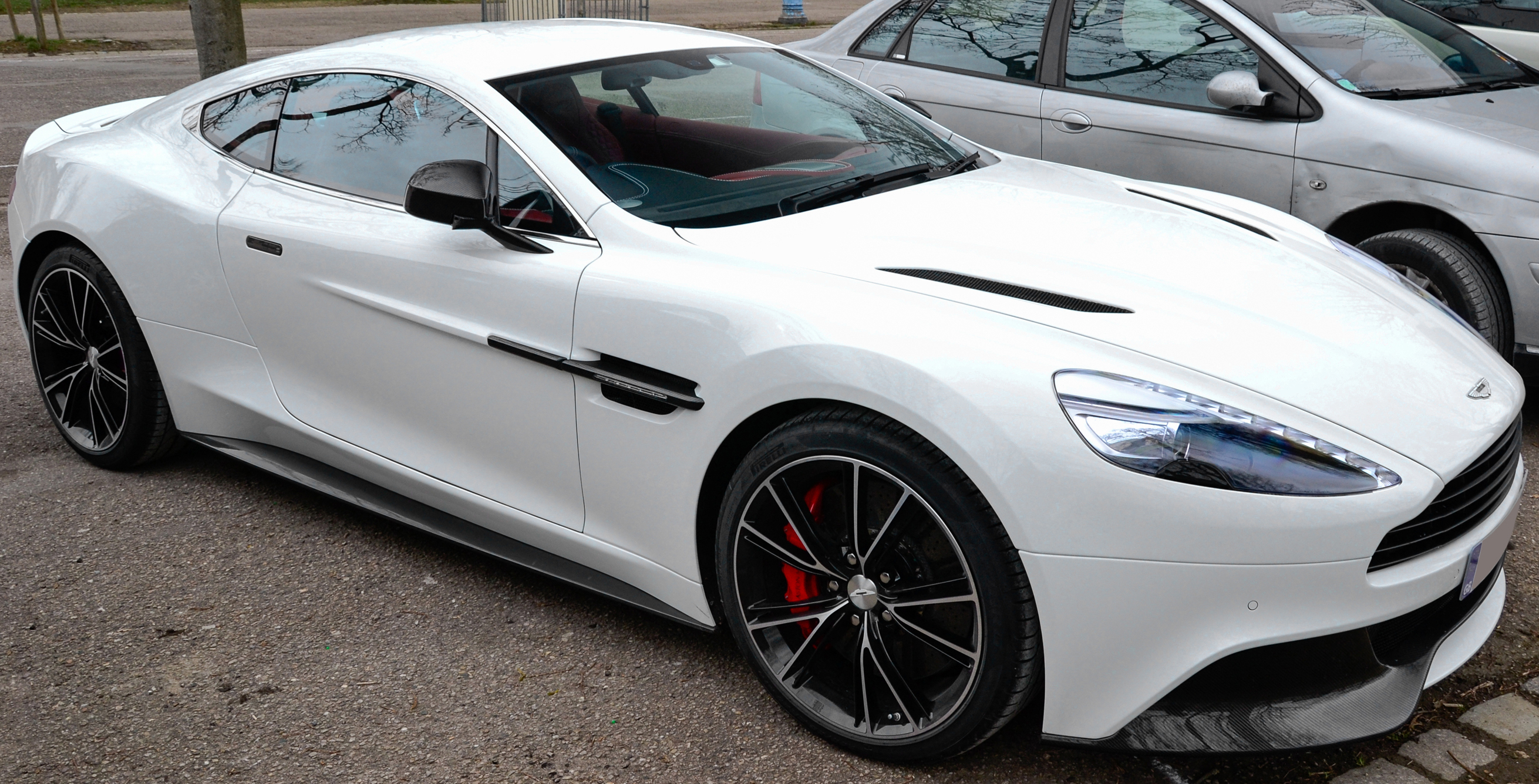
2012–2018 Aston Martin Vanquish

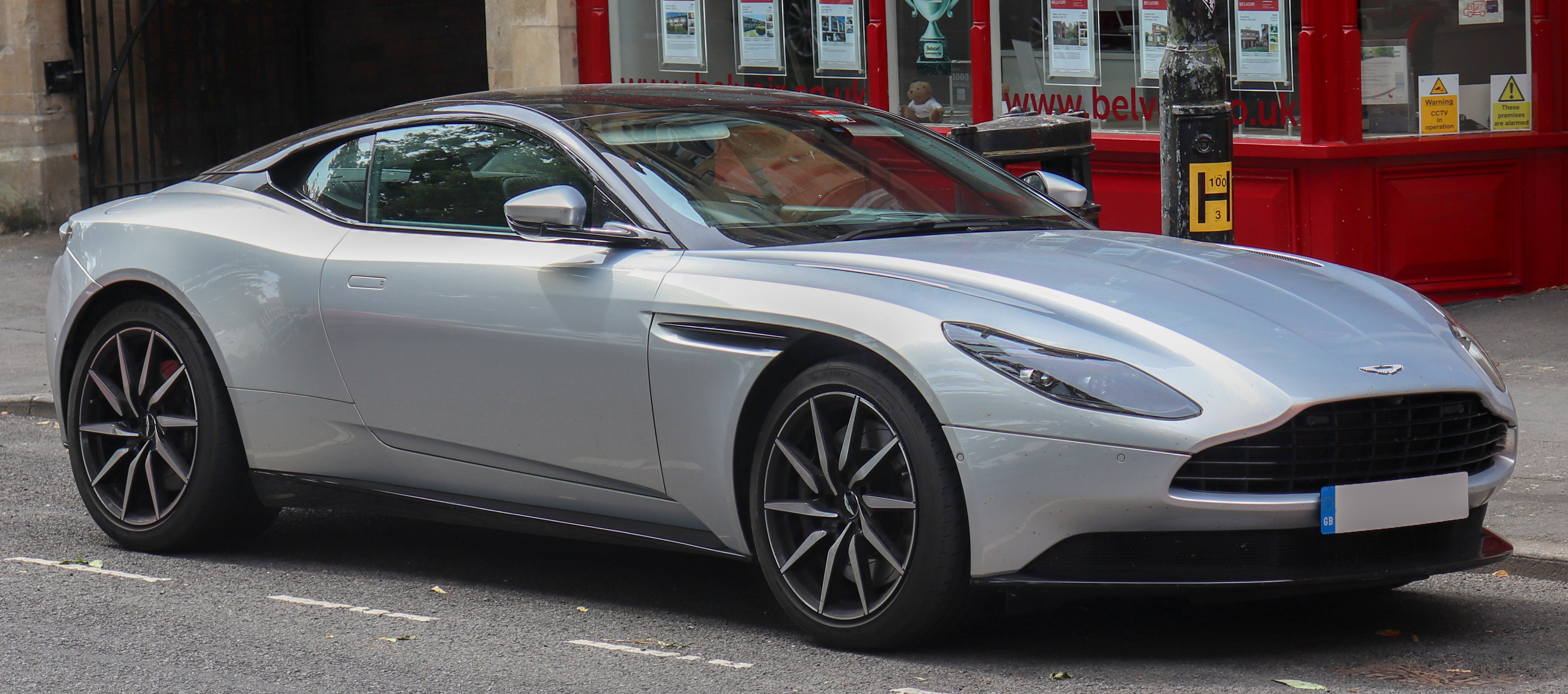
2016–2023 Aston Martin DB11

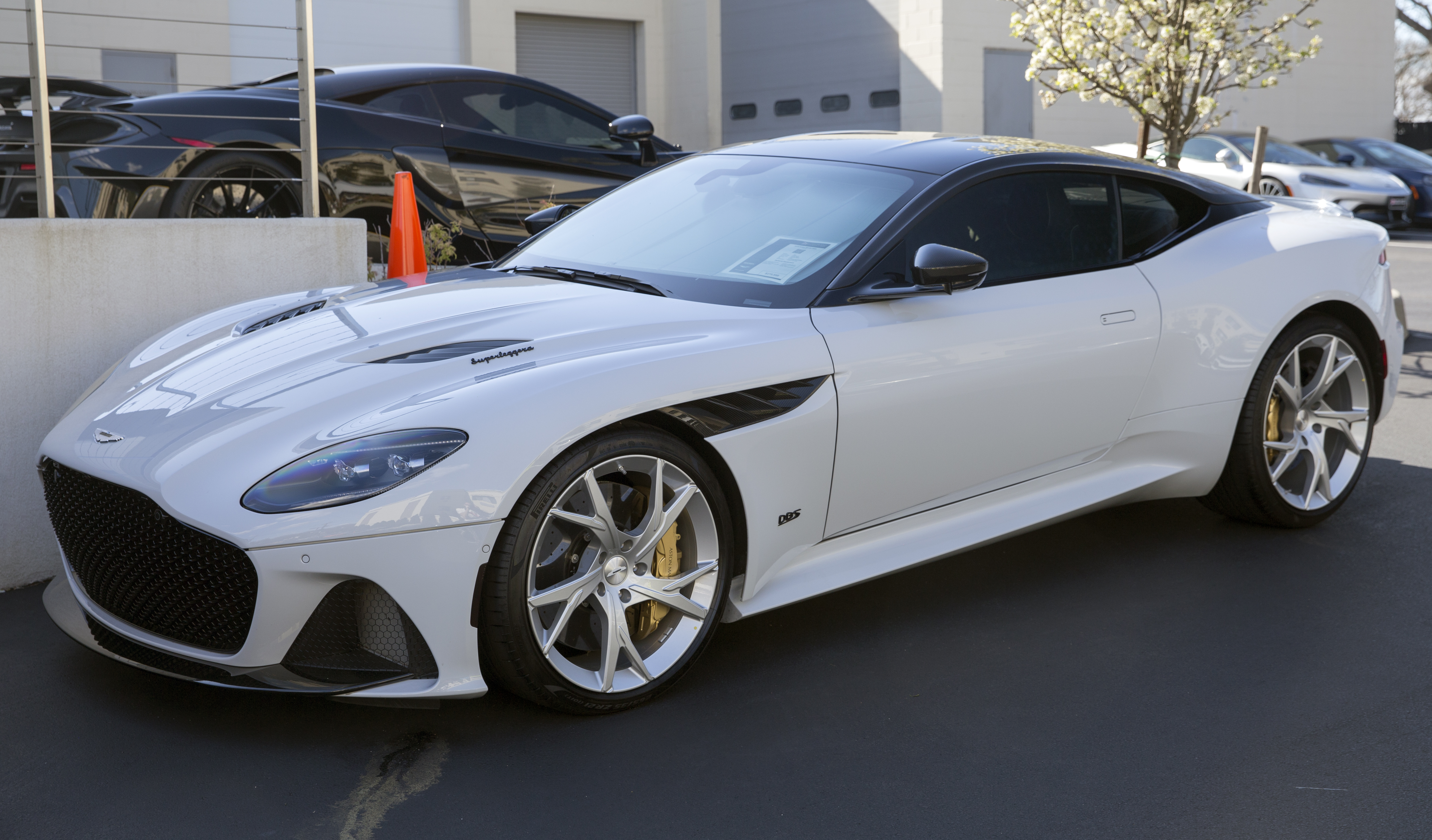
2018–2024 Aston Martin DBS Superleggera

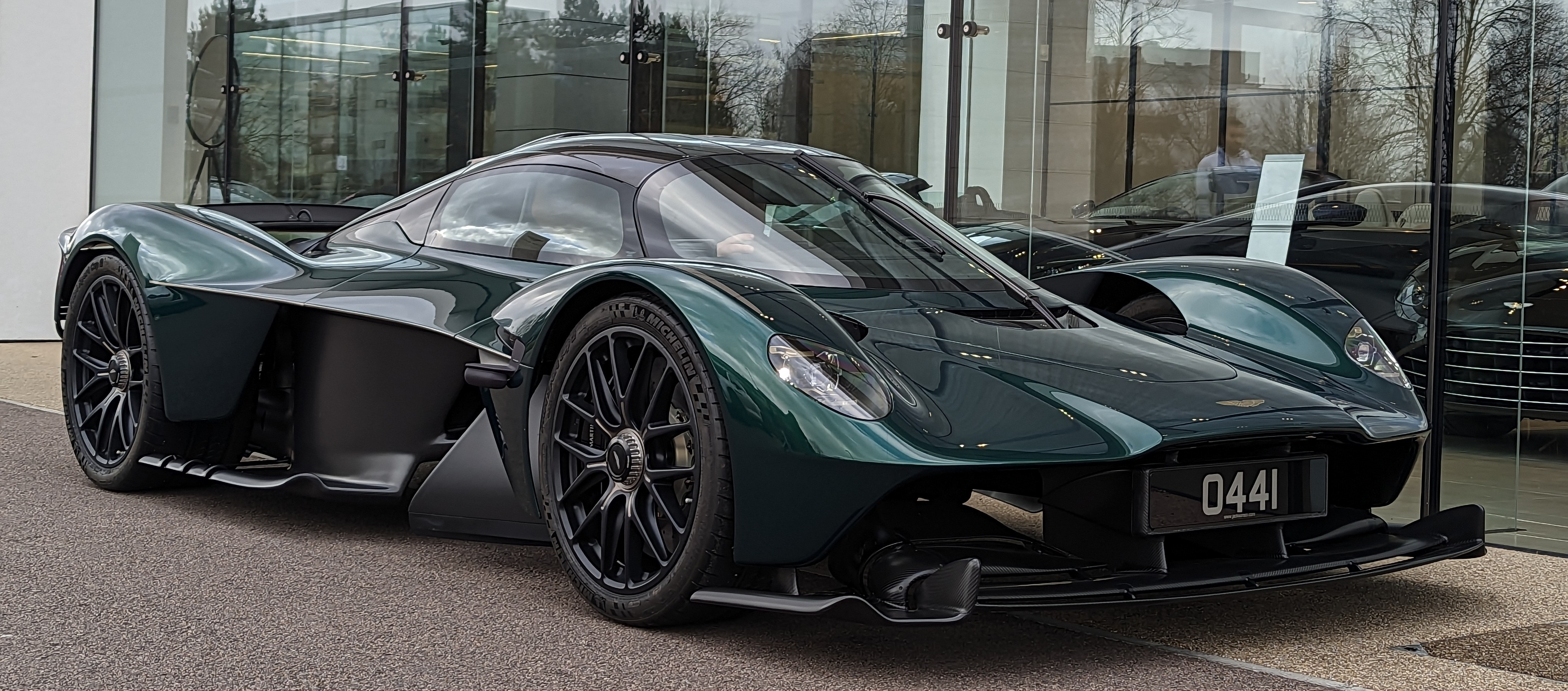
2021–2024 Aston Martin Valkyrie

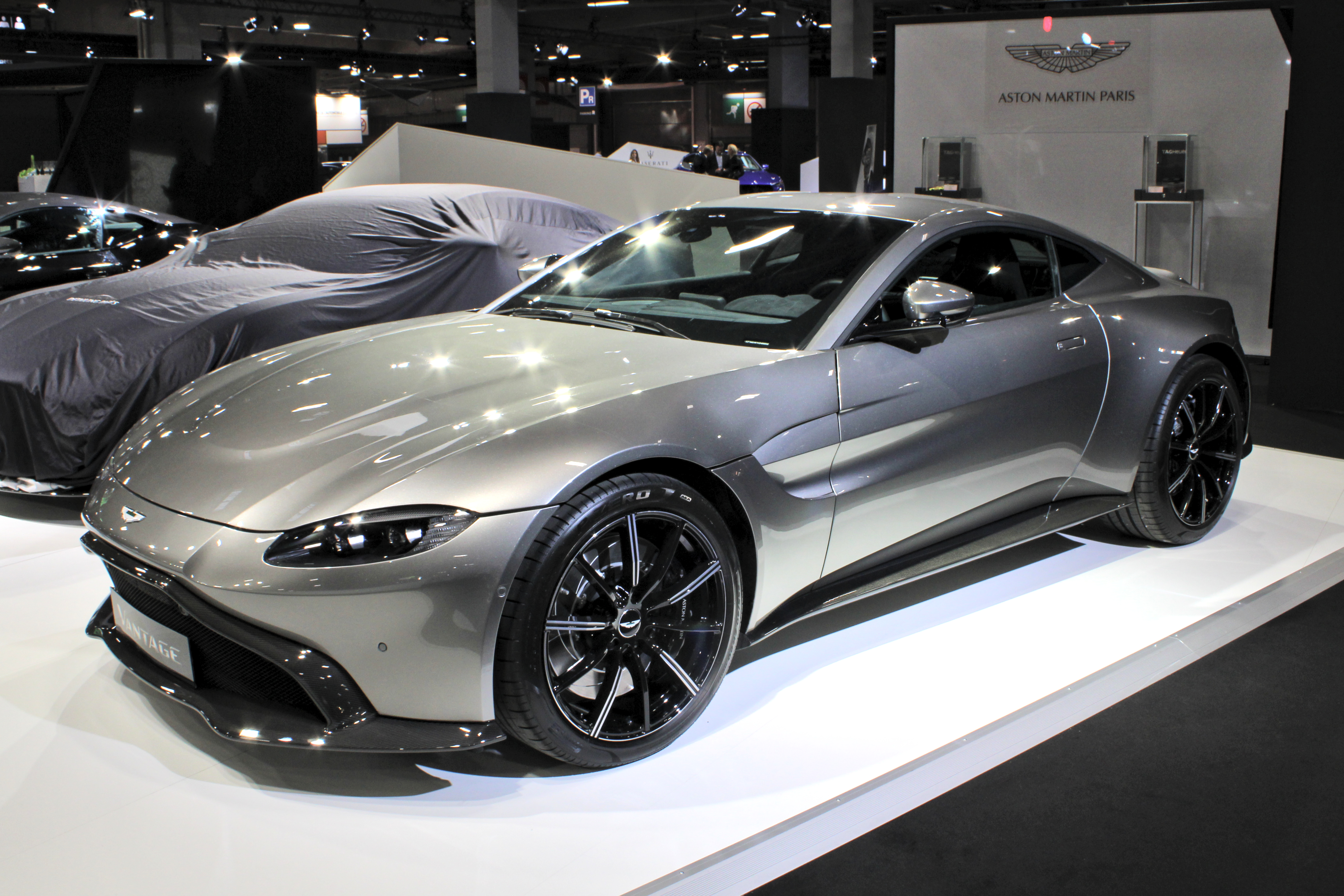
2018– Aston Martin Vantage

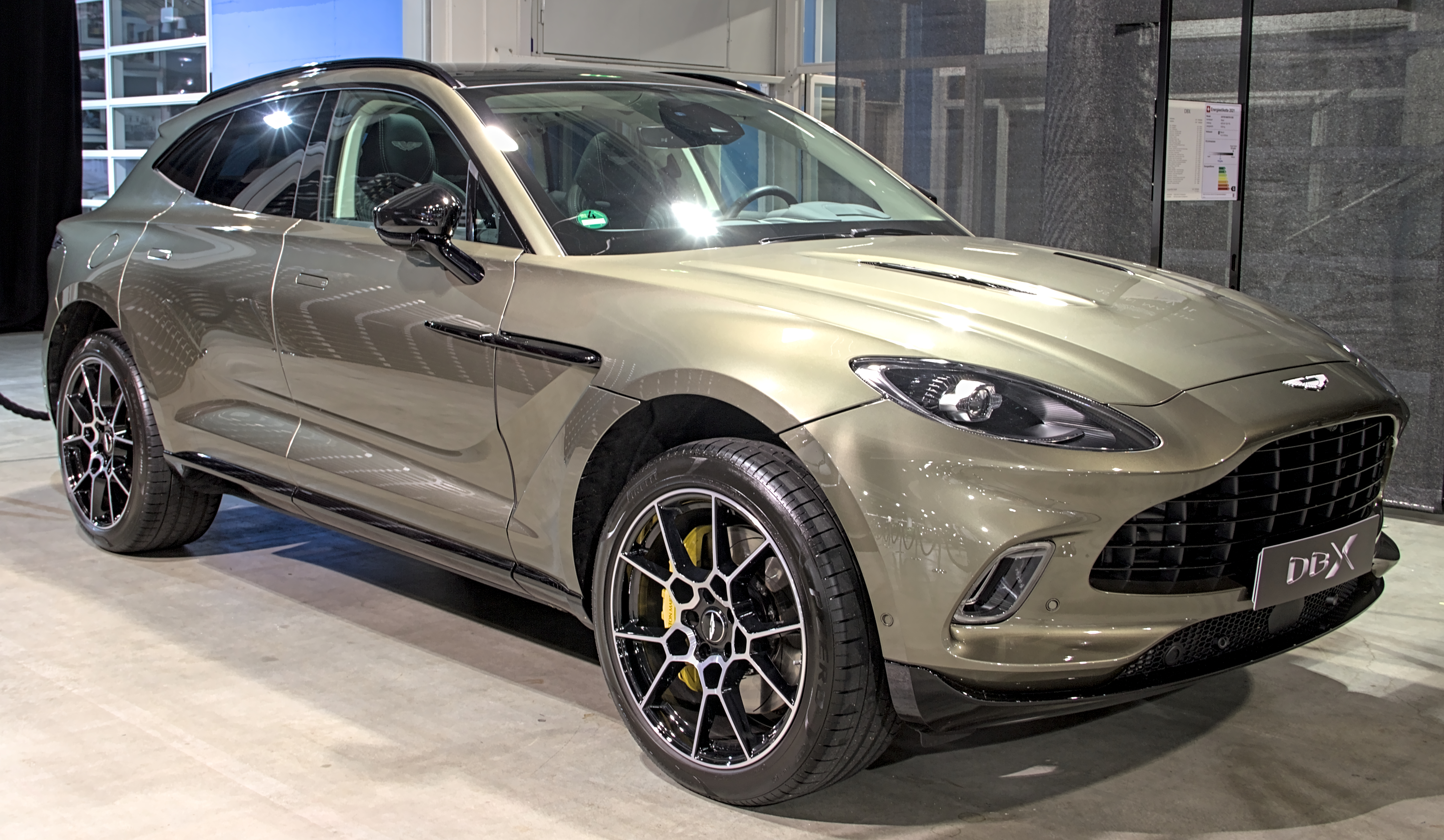
2020– Aston Martin DBX

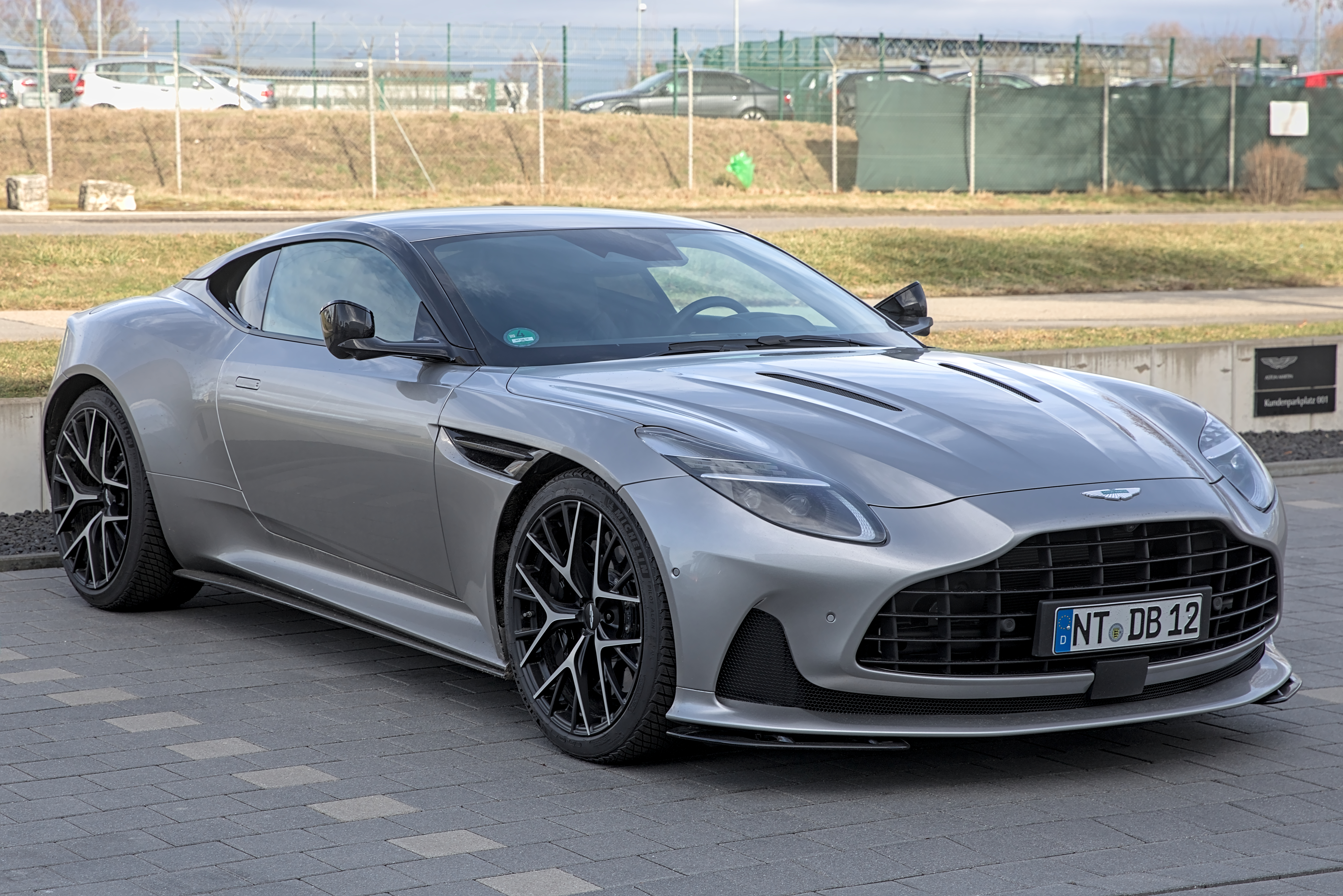
2023– Aston Martin DB12

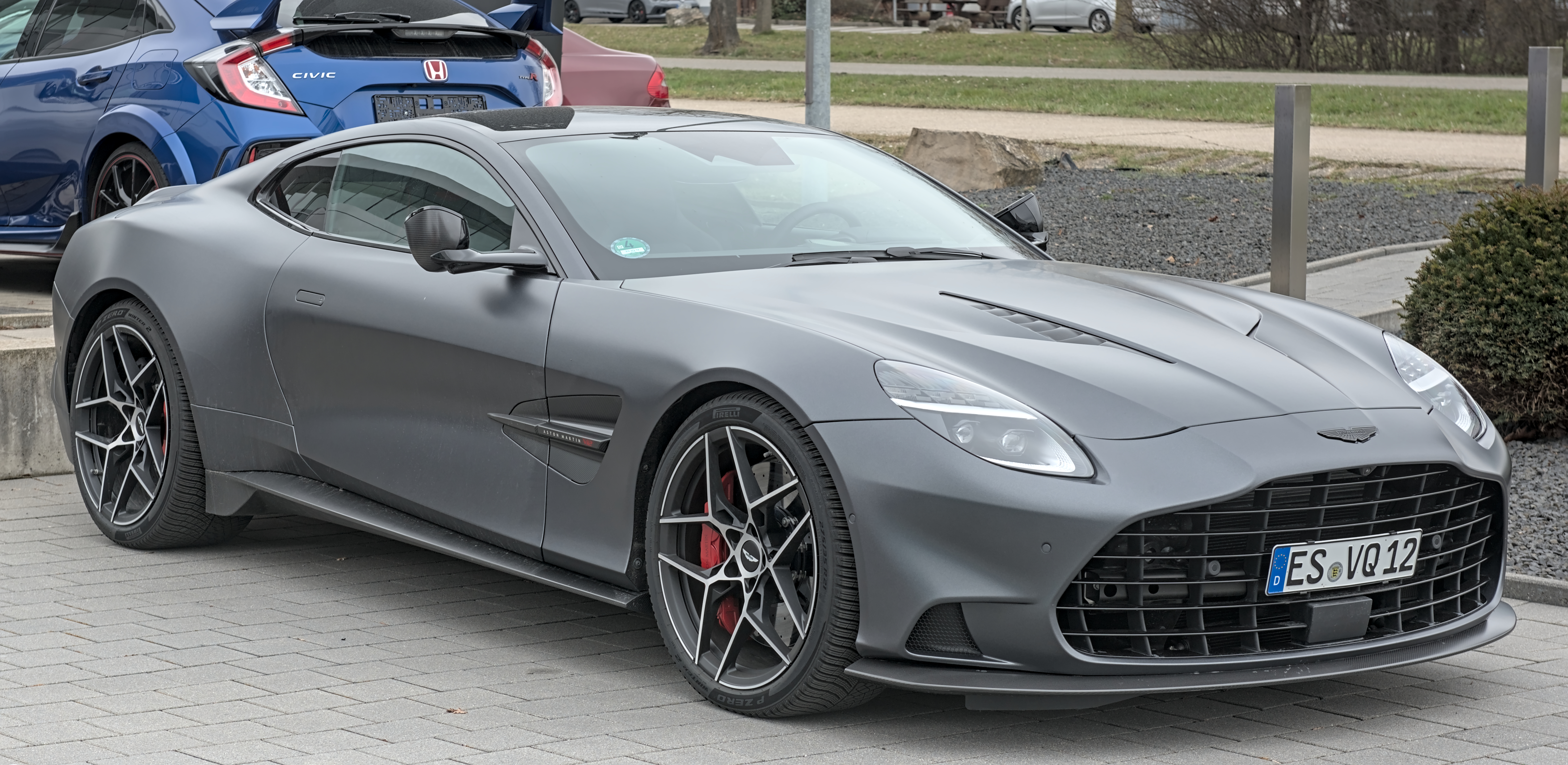
2024– Aston Martin Vanquish

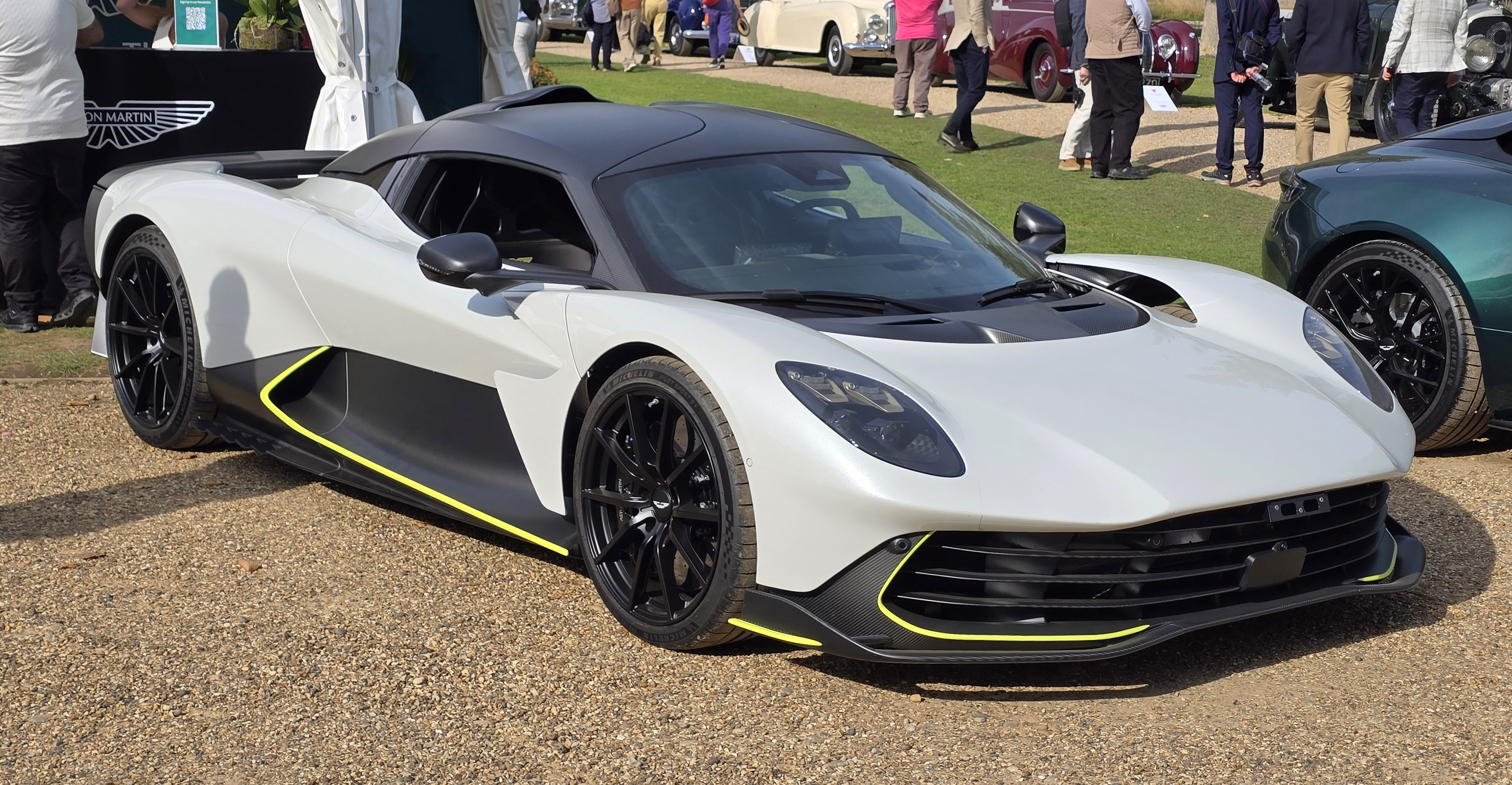
2025– Aston Martin Valhalla

== Brand expansion ==
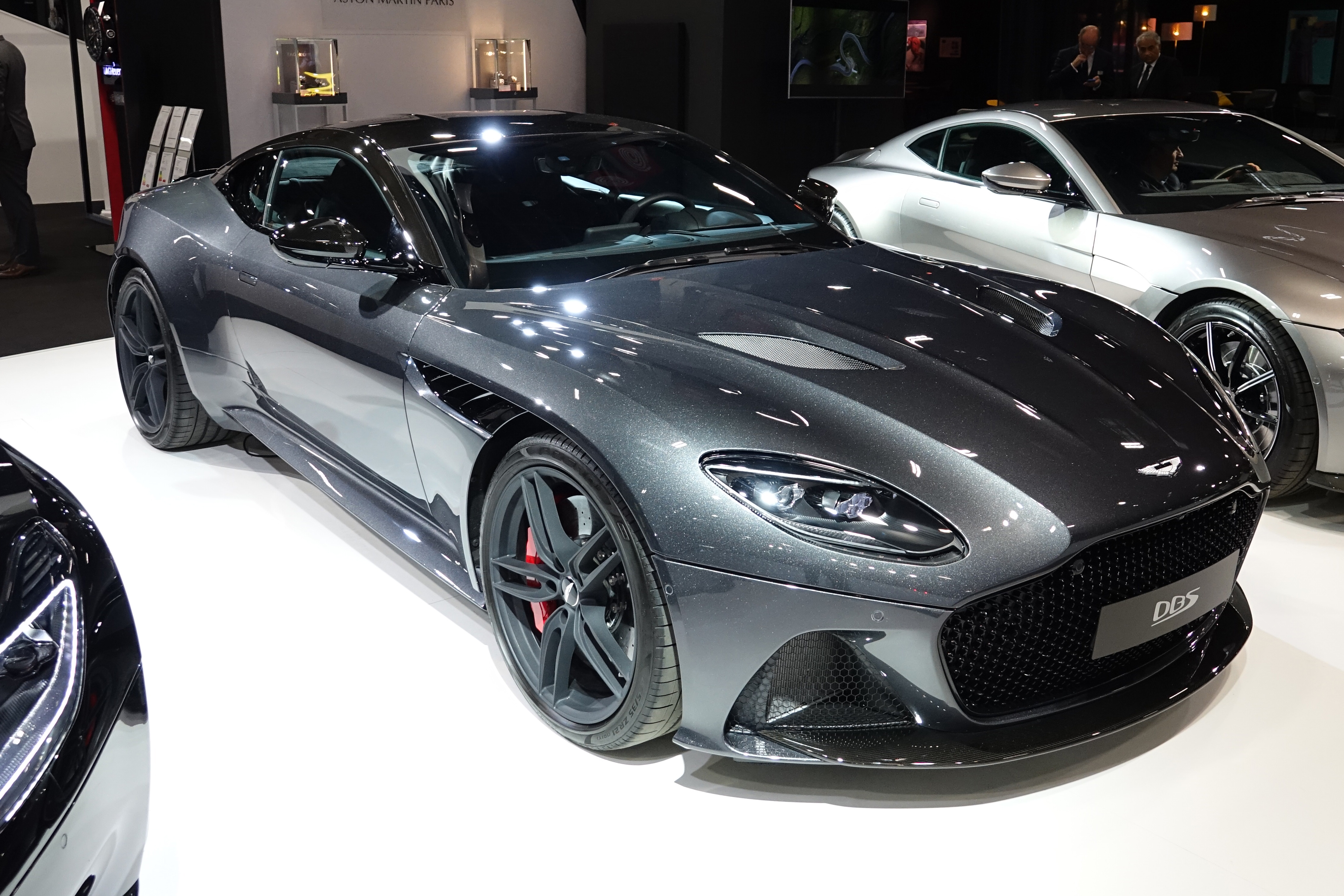
Aston Martin DBS Superleggera pictured in 2017

Since 2015, Aston Martin has sought to increase its appeal to women as a luxury lifestyle brand. A female advisory panel was established to adapt the design of the cars to the taste of women. In September 2016, a 37-foot-long Aston Martin speedboat was unveiled called the Aston Martin AM37 powerboat. In May 2018, Aston Martin launched a submersible called Project Neptune in partnership with submarine building company Triton Submarines. Aston Martin has collaborated with the luxury clothing company Hackett London to deliver items of clothing. In November 2017, Aston Martin unveiled a special limited edition bicycle after collaborating with bicycle manufacturer Storck.

Aston Martin and global property developer G&G Business Developments constructed a 66-storey luxury condominium tower called Aston Martin Residences at 300 Biscayne Boulevard Way in Miami, Florida, which opened in 2024.

In July 2018, Aston Martin unveiled the Volante Vision Concept, a luxury concept aircraft with vertical take-off and landing capabilities. Also in July, a Lego version of James Bond's DB5 car was put on sale, and an Aston Martin-branded watch was released in collaboration with TAG Heuer.

In October 2018, Aston Martin announced it was opening a design and brand studio in Shanghai.

== Motorsport ==
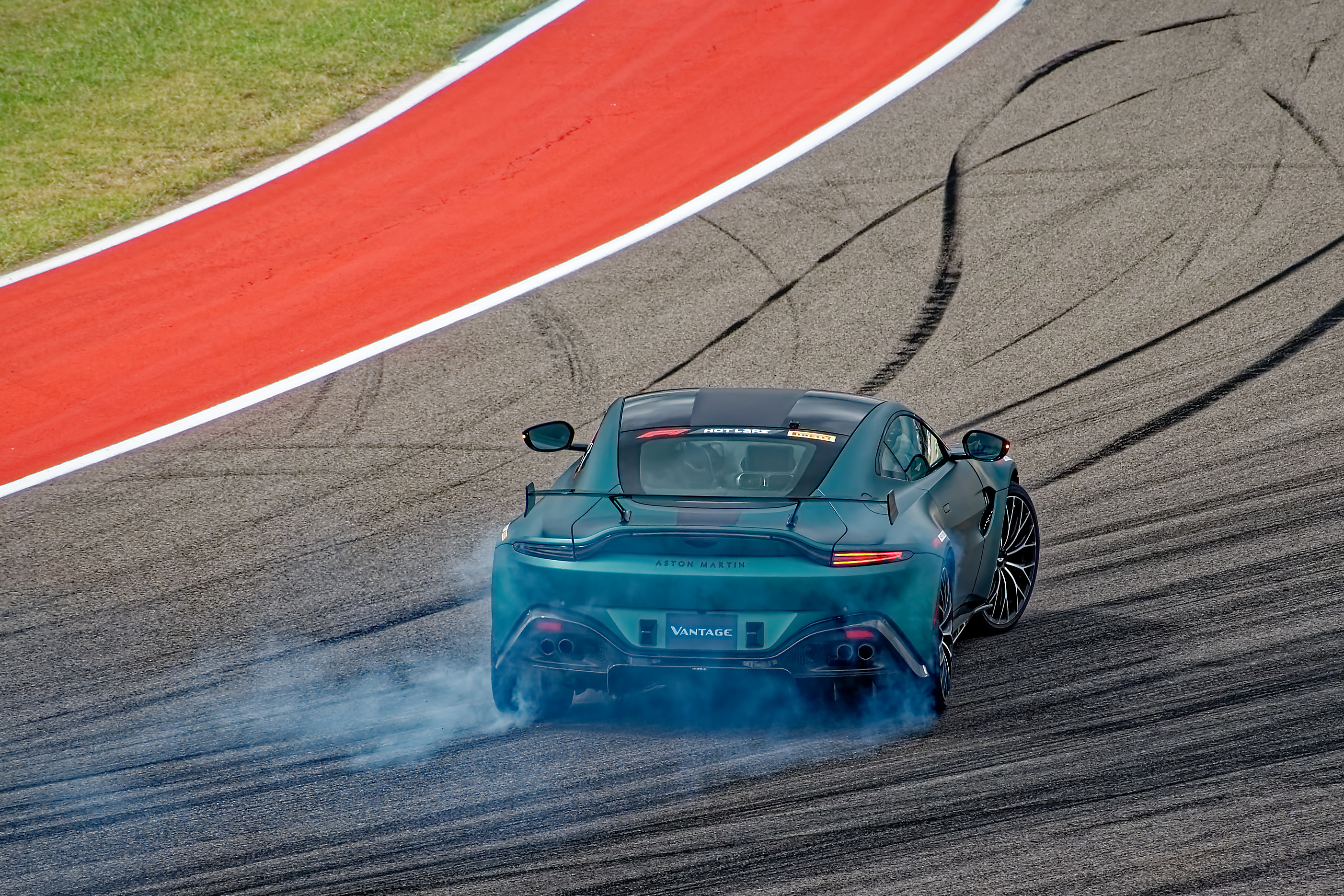
Aston Martin Vantage F1 Edition at the 2021 United States Grand Prix

Aston Martin is currently associated with two different racing organisations. The Aston Martin Formula One team which competes in the Formula One Championship and Aston Martin Racing which currently competes in the FIA World Endurance Championship. Both racing organisations use the Aston Martin brand, but are not directly owned by Aston Martin. The Aston Martin Formula One team is owned by major Aston Martin shareholder Lawrence Stroll and operated by his company AMR GP, while Aston Martin Racing is operated by racing company Prodrive as part of an agreement with Aston Martin.

=== Formula One ===
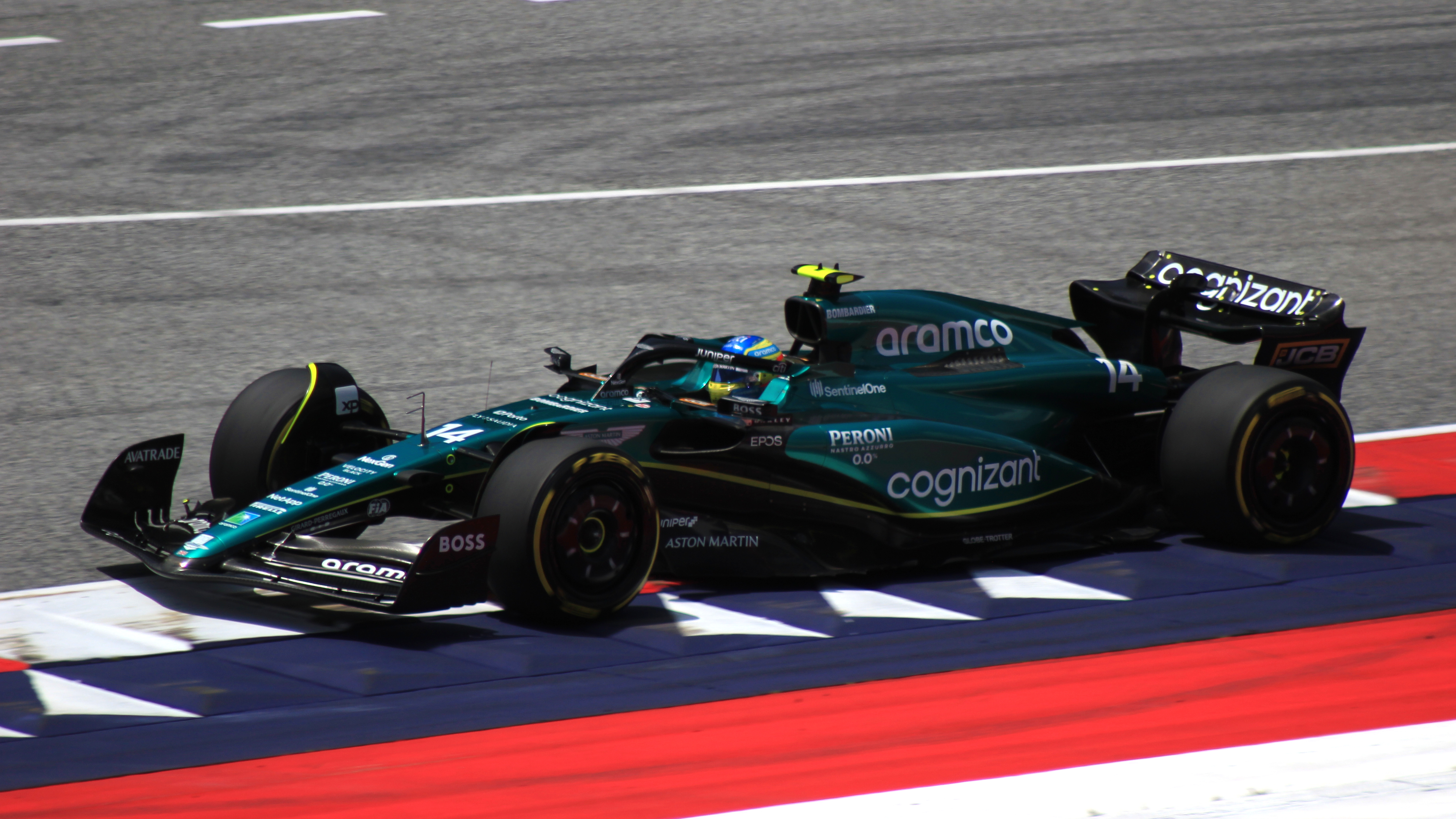
Aston Martin AMR23 at the 2023 Austrian Grand Prix

Aston Martin participated as a Formula One constructor in 1959 and 1960 entering six races over the two years but failing to score any points. In January 2020, it was announced that the Racing Point F1 Team is due to be rebranded as Aston Martin for the 2021 season, as a result of a funding investment led by Racing Point owner Lawrence Stroll. As part of the rebrand, the team switched their racing colour of BWT pink to a modern iteration of Aston Martin's British racing green. The Aston Martin AMR21 was unveiled in March 2021 and became Aston Martin's first Formula One car after a 61-year absence from the sport.

=== Racing cars (post-war) ===
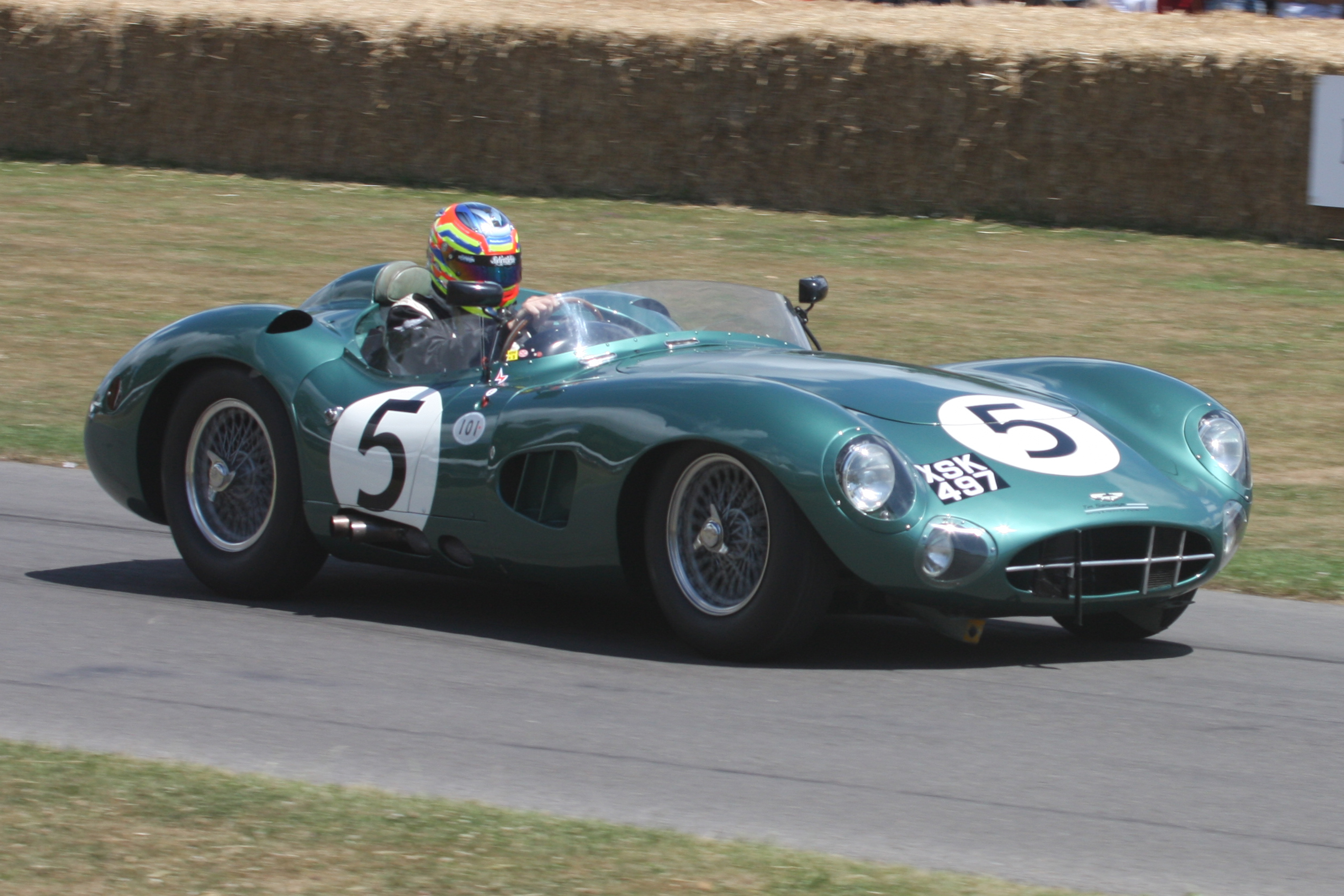
DBR1/2 at Goodwood Festival of Speed 2009

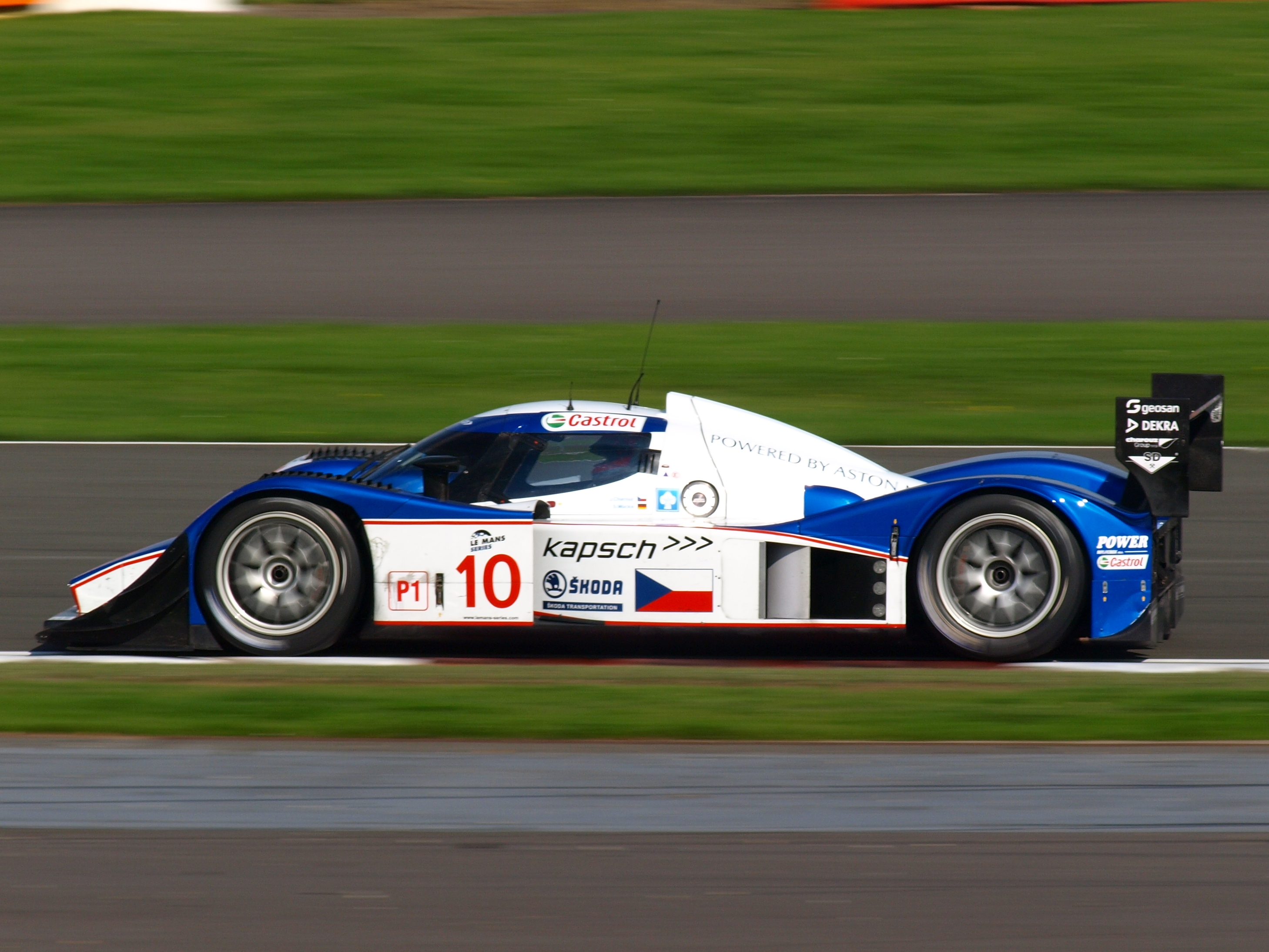
Part of Aston Martin's most recent racing program, Charouz Racing System competed with sports prototypes powered by an Aston Martin V12.

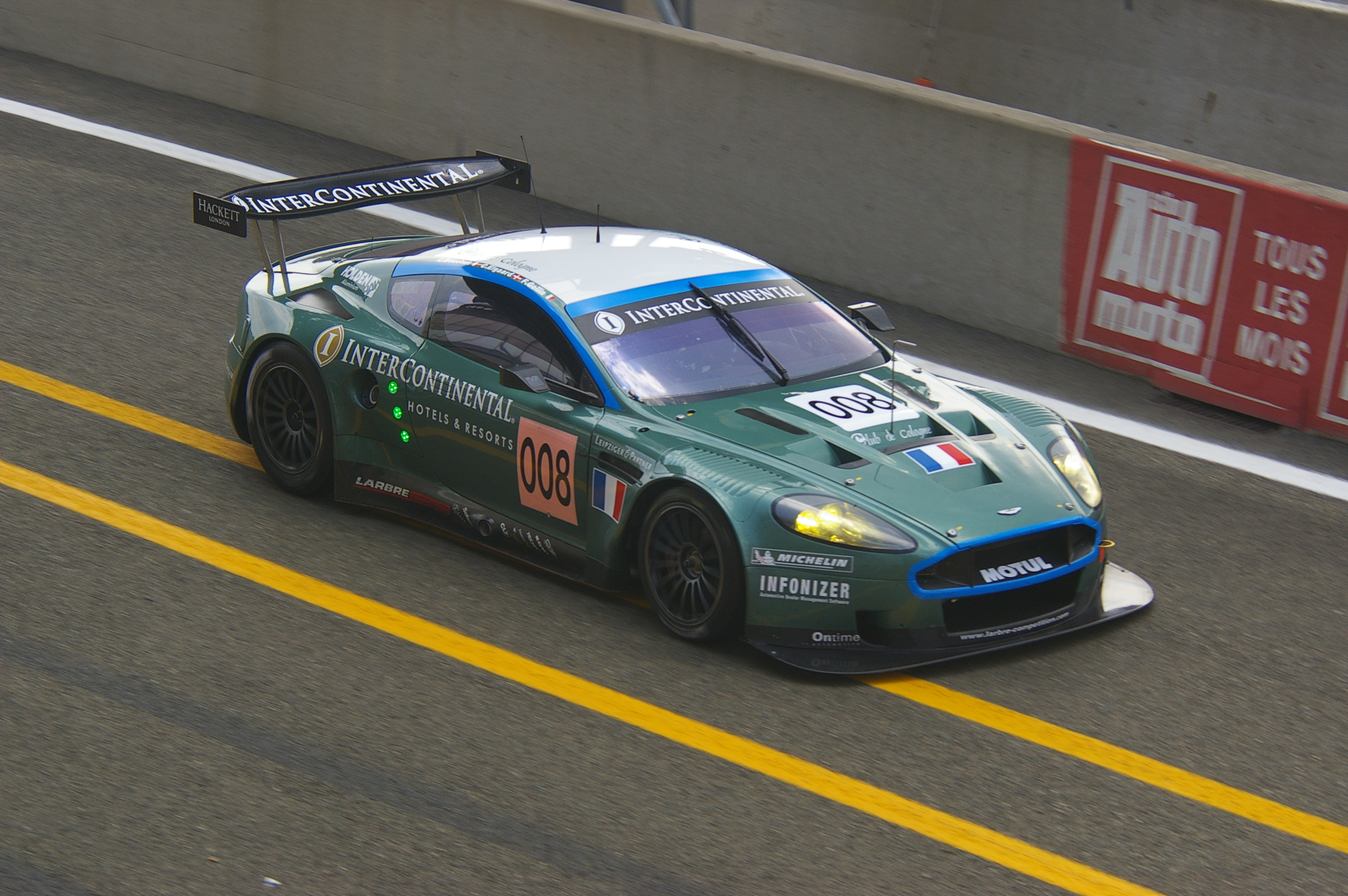
Aston Martin DBR9

- Aston Martin DB3 (1950–1953)
- Aston Martin DB3S (1953–1956)
- Aston Martin DBR1 (1956–1959)
- Aston Martin DBR2 (1957–1958)
- Aston Martin DBR3 (1958)
- Aston Martin DBR4 (1959)
- Aston Martin DBR5 (1960)
- Aston Martin DP212 (1962)
- Aston Martin DP214 (1963)
- Aston Martin DP215 (1963)
- Aston Martin RHAM/1 (1976–1979)
- Aston Martin AMR1 (1989)
- Aston Martin AMR2 (never raced)
- Aston Martin DBR9 (2005–2008)
- Aston Martin DBRS9 (2005–2008)
- Aston Martin V8 Vantage N24 (2006–2008)
- Aston Martin V8 Vantage Rally GT (2006–2010)
- Aston Martin V8 Vantage GT2 (2008–2017)
- Aston Martin V8 Vantage GT4 (2008–2018)
- Aston Martin DBR1-2 (2009)
- Aston Martin AMR-One (2011)
- Aston Martin Vantage GTE (2018–2023)
- Aston Martin Vantage DTM (2019)
- Aston Martin Vantage GT3 (2019–)
- Aston Martin Vantage GT4 (2019–)
- Aston Martin AMR21 (2021)
- Aston Martin AMR22 (2022)
- Aston Martin AMR23 (2023)
- Aston Martin AMR24 (2024)
- Aston Martin Valkyrie AMR-LMH (2025)
- Aston Martin AMR25 (2025)
- Aston Martin AMR26 (2026)

==== Aston Martin-powered racing cars ====
- Cooper-Aston Martin (1963)
- Lola T70-Aston Martin (1967)
- Aston Martin DPLM (1980–1982)
- Nimrod NRA/C2-Aston Martin (1982–1984)
- Aston Martin EMKA C83/1 and C84/1 (1983–1985)
- Cheetah G604-Aston Martin
- Lola B08/60-Aston Martin (2008–2011)

=== Racecars ===
Year	Car	Image	Category
1950	Aston Martin DB3		Sports Car
1953	Aston Martin DB3S		Sports Car
1956	Aston Martin DBR1		Sports Car
1957	Aston Martin DBR2		Sports Car
1958	Aston Martin DBR3		Sports Car
1959	Aston Martin DBR4		Formula One
1960	Aston Martin DBR5		Formula One
1962	Aston Martin DP212		Sports Car
1963	Aston Martin DP214		Sports Car
1963	Aston Martin DP215		Sports Car
1974	Aston Martin RHAM/1		Group 5
1982	Aston Martin DPLM		Sports Car
1982	Nimrod NRA/C2		Group C
1983	EMKA Aston Martin		Group C
1983	Nimrod NRA/C2B		Group C
1989	Aston Martin AMR1		Group C1
2006	Aston Martin DBRS9		Group GT3
2006	Aston Martin Vantage N24		SRO GT4
2006	Aston Martin Vantage V8 R-GT		Group R-GT
2008	Aston Martin V8 Vantage GT2		LM GTE
2008	Aston Martin V8 Vantage GT4		SRO GT4
2009	Aston Martin DBR1-2 (Lola-Aston Martin B09/60)		LMP1
2009	Aston Martin DBR9		Group GT
2011	Aston Martin AMR-One		LMP1
2012	Aston Martin V8 Vantage GTE		LM GTE
2012	Aston Martin V12 Vantage GT3		Group GT3
2018	Aston Martin V8 Vantage AMR GTE		LM GTE
2019	Aston Martin Vantage DTM		Class 1
2019	Aston Martin Vantage AMR GT3		Group GT3
2019	Aston Martin Vantage AMR GT4		SRO GT4
2021	Aston Martin AMR21		Formula One
2022	Aston Martin AMR22		Formula One
2023	Aston Martin AMR23		Formula One
2024	Aston Martin AMR24		Formula One
2024	Aston Martin Vantage AMR GT3 Evo		Group GT3
2024	Aston Martin Vantage AMR GT4 Evo		SRO GT4
2025	Aston Martin AMR25		Formula One
2025	Aston Martin Valkyrie AMR-LMH		LMH
2026	Aston Martin AMR26		Formula One

=== 24 Hours of Le Mans finishes ===
Year	Pos	Class	No	Team	Drivers	Chassis	Engine	Laps
1931	5	1.5	25	(United Kingdom) Aston Martin	(United Kingdom) A.C. Bertelli (United Kingdom) Maurice Harvey	Aston Martin 1½-litre International	Aston Martin 1.5L I4	139
1932	5	1.5	20	(United Kingdom) Aston Martin Ltd.	(United Kingdom) Sammy Newsome (Sweden) Henken Widengren	Aston Martin 1½-litre Le Mans	Aston Martin 1.5L I4	174
1932	7	1.5	21	(United Kingdom) Aston Martin Ltd.	(United Kingdom) A.C. Bertelli (United Kingdom) Pat Driscoll	Aston Martin 1½-litre Le Mans	Aston Martin 1.5L I4	168
1933	5	1.5	25	(United Kingdom) Aston Martin Ltd.	(United Kingdom) Pat Driscoll (United Kingdom) Clifton Penn-Hughes	Aston Martin 1½-litre Le Mans	Aston Martin 1.5L I4	188
1933	7	1.5	24	(United Kingdom) Aston Martin Ltd.	(United Kingdom) A.C. Bertelli (United Kingdom) Sammy Davis	Aston Martin 1½-litre Le Mans	Aston Martin 1.5L I4	174
1934	10	1.5	20	(United Kingdom) M.R.E. Tongue	(United Kingdom) Reggie Tongue (United Kingdom) Maurice Faulkner	Aston Martin 1½-litre Le Mans	Aston Martin 1.5L I4	188
1934	11	1.5	24	(United Kingdom) John Cecil Noël	(United Kingdom) John Cecil Noël (United Kingdom) Jen Wheeler	Aston Martin 1½-litre Le Mans	Aston Martin 1.5L I4	180
1935	3	1.5	29	(United Kingdom) Roy Eccles	(United Kingdom) Charles E.C. Martin (United Kingdom) Charles Brackenbury	Aston Martin 1½-litre Ulster	Aston Martin 1.5L I4	215
1935	8	1.5	33	(United Kingdom) Maurice Faulkner	(United Kingdom) Maurice Faulkner (United Kingdom) Tom Clarke	Aston Martin 1½-litre Ulster	Aston Martin 1.5L I4	202
1935	10	1.5	32	(United Kingdom) C.T. Thomas	(United Kingdom) C.T. Thomas (United Kingdom) M. Kenyon	Aston Martin 1½-litre Ulster	Aston Martin 1.5L I4	199
1935	11	1.5	31	(United Kingdom) P.L. Donkin	(United Kingdom) Peter Donkin (United Kingdom) Lord Malcolm Douglas-Hamilton	Aston Martin 1½-litre Ulster	Aston Martin 1.5L I4	199
1935	12	1.5	27	(United Kingdom) John Cecil Noël	(United Kingdom) Jim Elwes (United Kingdom) Mortimer Morris-Goodall	Aston Martin 1½-litre	Aston Martin 1.5L I4	196
1935	15	1.5	30	(United Kingdom) R.P. Gardner	(United Kingdom) R.P. Gardner (United Kingdom) A.C. Beloë	Aston Martin 1½-litre Ulster	Aston Martin 1.5L I4	190
1937	5	1.5	37	(United Kingdom) J.M. Skeffington	(United Kingdom) J.M. Skeffington (United Kingdom) R.C. Murton-Neale	Aston Martin 1½-litre Ulster	Aston Martin 1.5L I4	205
1937	11	2.0	31	(United Kingdom) C.T. Thomas	(United Kingdom) Mortimer Morris-Goodall (United Kingdom) Robert P. Hichens	Aston Martin Speed Model	Aston Martin 2.0L I4	193
1939	12	2.0	29	(United Kingdom) Robert Peverell Hichens	(United Kingdom) Robert P. Hichens (United Kingdom) Mortimer Morris-Goodall	Aston Martin Speed Model	Aston Martin 2.0L I4	199
1949	7	S 2.0	27	(United Kingdom) Arthur Jones	(United Kingdom) Arthur Jones (United Kingdom) Nick Haines	Aston Martin 2-Litre Sports (DB1)	Aston Martin 2.0L I4	207
1949	11	S 2.0	29	(United Kingdom) Robert Lawrie	(United Kingdom) Robert Lawrie (United Kingdom) Robert W. Walke	Aston Martin 2-Litre Sports (DB1)	Aston Martin 2.0L I4	193
1950	5	S 3.0	19	(United Kingdom) Aston Martin Ltd.	(United Kingdom) George Abecassis (United Kingdom) Lance Macklin	Aston Martin DB2	Aston Martin 2.6L I6	249
1950	6	S 3.0	21	(United Kingdom) Aston Martin Ltd.	(United Kingdom) Charles Brackenbury (United Kingdom) Reg Parnell	Aston Martin DB2	Aston Martin 2.6L I6	244
1951	3	S 3.0	26	(United Kingdom) Aston Martin Ltd.	(United Kingdom) Lance Macklin (United Kingdom) Eric Thompson	Aston Martin DB2	Aston Martin 2.6L I6	257
1951	5	S 3.0	25	(United Kingdom) Aston Martin Ltd.	(United Kingdom) George Abecassis (United Kingdom) Brian Shawe-Taylor	Aston Martin DB2	Aston Martin 2.6L I6	255
1951	7	S 3.0	24	(United Kingdom) Aston Martin Ltd.	(United Kingdom) Reg Parnell (United Kingdom) David Hampshire	Aston Martin DB2	Aston Martin 2.6L I6	252
1951	10	S 3.0	28	(United Kingdom) N.H. Mann	(United Kingdom) Nigel Mann (United Kingdom) Mortimer Morris-Goodall	Aston Martin DB2	Aston Martin 2.6L I6	236
1951	13	S 3.0	27	(United Kingdom) P.T.C. Clark	(United Kingdom) Peter Clark (United Kingdom) James Scott Douglas	Aston Martin DB2	Aston Martin 2.6L I6	233
1952	7	S 3.0	32	(United Kingdom) Peter C.T. Clark	(United Kingdom) Peter Clark (United Kingdom) Mike Keen	Aston Martin DB2	Aston Martin 2.6L I6	248
1955	2	S 3.0	23	(United Kingdom) Aston Martin Ltd.	(United Kingdom) Peter Collins (Belgium) Paul Frère	Aston Martin DB3S	Aston Martin 2.9L I6	302
1956	2	S 3.0	8	(United Kingdom) Aston Martin Ltd.	(United Kingdom) Stirling Moss (United Kingdom) Peter Collins	Aston Martin DB3S	Aston Martin 2.9L I6	299
1957	11	S 3000	21	(United Kingdom) David Brown	(France) Jean-Paul Colas (France) Jean Kerguen	Aston Martin DB3S	Aston Martin 3.0L I6	272
1958	2	S 3000	5	(United Kingdom) P & A.G. Whitehead	(United Kingdom) Graham Whitehead (United Kingdom) Peter Whitehead	Aston Martin DB3S	Aston Martin 3.0L I6	293
1959	1	S 3.0	5	(United Kingdom) David Brown Racing Dept.	(United States) Carroll Shelby (United Kingdom) Roy Salvadori	Aston Martin DBR1/300	Aston Martin 3.0L I6	323
1959	2	S 3.0	6	(United Kingdom) David Brown Racing Dept.	(France) Maurice Trintignant (Belgium) Paul Frère	Aston Martin DBR1/300	Aston Martin 3.0L I6	322
1960	3	S 3.0	7	(United Kingdom) Border Reivers	(United Kingdom) Roy Salvadori (United Kingdom) Jim Clark	Aston Martin DBR1/300	Aston Martin 3.0L I6	306
1960	9	S 3.0	8	(United Kingdom) Major Ian B. Baillie	(United Kingdom) Ian B. Baillie (United Kingdom) Jack Fairman	Aston Martin DBR1/300	Aston Martin 3.0L I6	281
1977	17	GTP	83	(United Kingdom) SAS Robin Hamilton	(United Kingdom) Robin Hamilton (United Kingdom) David Preece (United Kingdom) Mike Salmon	Aston Martin DBS V8 RHAM/1	Aston Martin 5.3L V8	260
1982	7	C	32	(United Kingdom) Viscount Downe Pace Petroleum	(United Kingdom) Ray Mallock (United Kingdom) Simon Phillips (United Kingdom) Mike Salmon	Nimrod NRA/C2	Aston Martin-Tickford DP1229 5.3L V8	317
1983	17	C	41	(United Kingdom) EMKA Productions Ltd.	(United Kingdom) Tiff Needell (United Kingdom) Steve O'Rourke (United Kingdom) Nick Faure	EMKA C83/1	Aston Martin-Tickford 5.3L V8	275
1985	11	C1	66	(United Kingdom) EMKA Productions, Ltd.	(United Kingdom) Tiff Needell (United Kingdom) Steve O'Rourke (United Kingdom) Nick Faure	EMKA C84/1	Aston Martin-Tickford 5.3L V8	338
1989	11	C1	18	(United Kingdom) Aston Martin (United Kingdom) Ecurie Ecosse	(United Kingdom) Brian Redman (Republic of Ireland) Michael Roe (Greece) Costas Los	Aston Martin AMR1	Aston Martin (Callaway) RDP87 6.0L V8	340
2005	9	GT1	59	(United Kingdom) Aston Martin Racing	(Australia) David Brabham (France) Stéphane Sarrazin (United Kingdom) Darren Turner	Aston Martin DBR9	Aston Martin 6.0L V12	333
2006	6	GT1	007	(United Kingdom) Aston Martin Racing	(Czech Republic) Tomáš Enge (United Kingdom) Darren Turner (Italy) Andrea Piccini	Aston Martin DBR9	Aston Martin 6.0L V12	350
2006	9	GT1	62	(Russia) Russian Age Racing (United Kingdom) Team Modena	(Spain) Antonio García (Australia) David Brabham (Brazil) Nelson Piquet Jr.	Aston Martin DBR9	Aston Martin 6.0L V12	343
2006	10	GT1	009	(United Kingdom) Aston Martin Racing	(Portugal) Pedro Lamy (France) Stéphane Sarrazin (Monaco) Stéphane Ortelli	Aston Martin DBR9	Aston Martin 6.0L V12	342
2007	1	GT1	009	(United Kingdom) Aston Martin Racing	(Australia) David Brabham (United Kingdom) Darren Turner (Sweden) Rickard Rydell	Aston Martin DBR9	Aston Martin 6.0L V12	343
2007	3	GT1	008	(France) AMR Larbre Compétition	(Denmark) Casper Elgaard (United Kingdom) Johnny Herbert (Italy) Fabrizio Gollin	Aston Martin DBR9	Aston Martin 6.0L V12	341
2007	4	GT1	007	(United Kingdom) Aston Martin Racing	(Czech Republic) Tomáš Enge (United Kingdom) Johnny Herbert (Netherlands) Peter Kox	Aston Martin DBR9	Aston Martin 6.0L V12	337
2008	1	GT1	009	(United Kingdom) Aston Martin Racing	(Australia) David Brabham (United Kingdom) Darren Turner (Spain) Antonio Garcia	Aston Martin DBR9	Aston Martin 6.0L V12	344
2008	4	GT1	007	(United Kingdom) Aston Martin Racing	(Germany) Heinz-Harald Frentzen (Italy) Andrea Piccini (Austria) Karl Wendlinger	Aston Martin DBR9	Aston Martin 6.0L V12	339
2009	4	LMP1	007	(Czech Republic) AMR Eastern Europe	(Czech Republic) Tomáš Enge (Czech Republic) Jan Charouz (Germany) Stefan Mücke	Lola-Aston Martin B09/60	Aston Martin 6.0L V12	373
2009	13	LMP1	008	(United Kingdom) Aston Martin Racing	(United Kingdom) Anthony Davidson (United Kingdom) Darren Turner (Netherlands) Jos Verstappen	Lola-Aston Martin B09/60	Aston Martin 6.0L V12	342
2009	3	GT1	66	(United Kingdom) Jetalliance Racing	(Austria) Lukas Lichtner-Hoyer (Austria) Thomas Gruber (Germany) Alex Müller	Aston Martin DBR9	Aston Martin 6.0L V12	294
2010	6	LMP1	007	(United Kingdom) Aston Martin Racing	(Switzerland) Harold Primat (Mexico) Adrián Fernández (Germany) Stefan Mücke	Lola-Aston Martin B09/60	Aston Martin 6.0L V12	365
2010	3	GT1	52	(Germany) Young Driver AMR	(Czech Republic) Tomáš Enge (Denmark) Christoffer Nygaard (Netherlands) Peter Kox	Aston Martin DBR9	Aston Martin 6.0L V12	311
2011	7	LMP1	22	(Belgium) Kronos Racing (Belgium) Marc VDS Racing Team	(Belgium) Vanina Ickx (Belgium) Bas Leinders (Belgium) Maxime Martin	Lola-Aston Martin B09/60	Aston Martin 6.0L V12	328
2012	3	GTE-Pro	97	(United Kingdom) Aston Martin Racing	(United Kingdom) Darren Turner (Mexico) Adrián Fernández (Germany) Stefan Mücke	Aston Martin V8 Vantage GTE	Aston Martin 4.5L V8	332
2013	3	GTE-Pro	97	(United Kingdom) Aston Martin Racing	(United Kingdom) Darren Turner (United Kingdom) Peter Dumbreck (Germany) Stefan Mücke	Aston Martin V8 Vantage GTE	Aston Martin 4.5L V8	314
2013	6	GTE-Am	96	(United Kingdom) Aston Martin Racing	(Germany) Roald Goethe (United Kingdom) Jamie Campbell-Walter (United Kingdom) Stuart Hall	Aston Martin V8 Vantage GTE	Aston Martin 4.5L V8	301

== Sponsorships ==
In 2011, Aston Martin entered into a three-year deal to become the primary sponsor of 2. Bundesliga club 1860 Munich.

== See also ==
- Aston Martin Heritage Trust Museum
- Aston Martin Owners Club
- List of car manufacturers of the United Kingdom
