= Aston Martin DP212 =

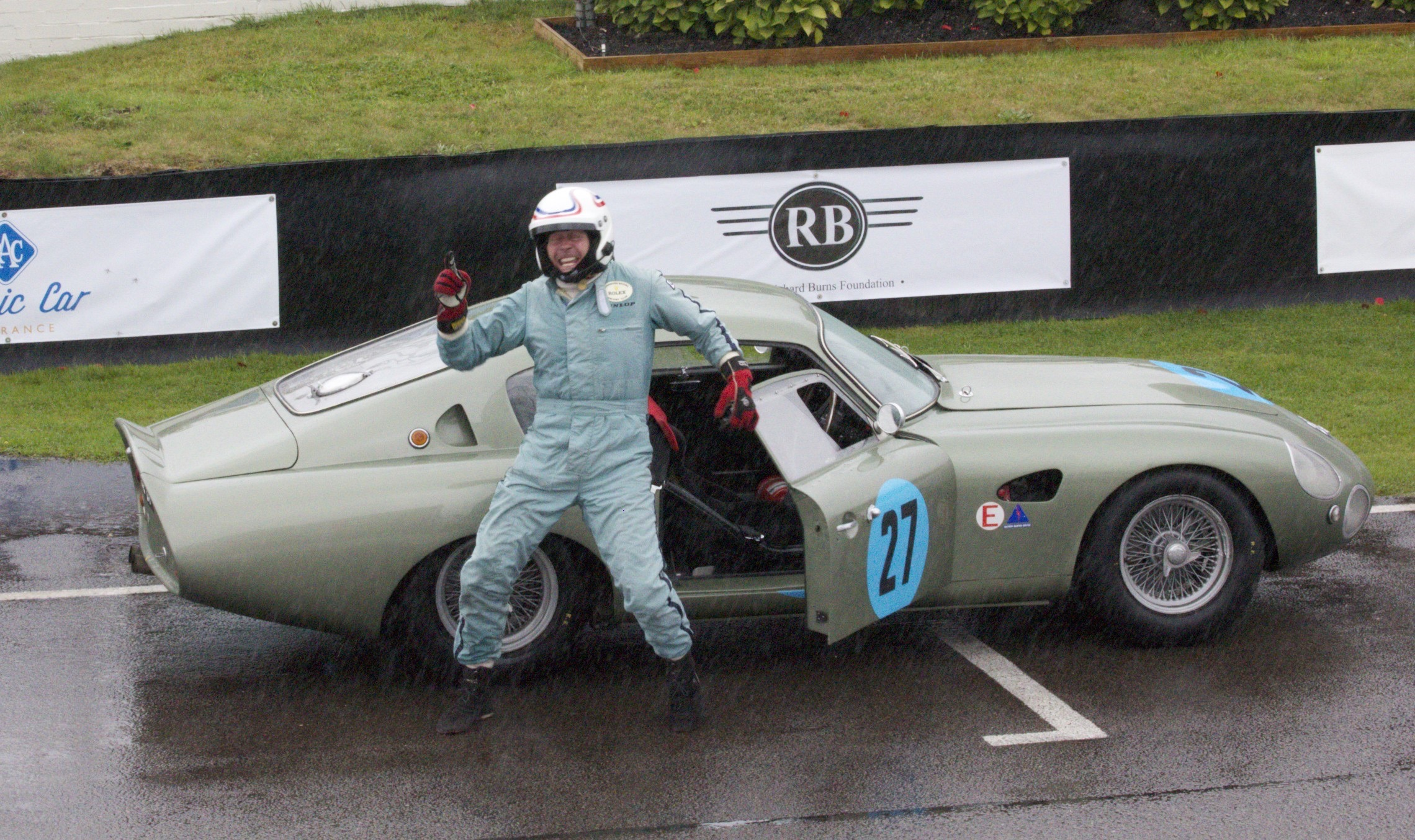
- Aston Martin DP212 at Goodwood Revival 2013, victorious in the TT race
- Category: Le Mans Racer Sports car racing
- Constructor: Aston Martin Lagonda LTD
- Designer: Ted Cutting

Technical specifications
- Chassis: Lightweight tubular steel frame, drilled rectangular box section, magnesium/aluminium alloy streamlined body
- Suspension (front): Double (unequal) wishbones and coil springs (modified DB4 GT suspension, with altered bump stop and roll centre)
- Suspension (rear): De Dion system, (from an experimental Lagonda Saloon); Torsion bar springing (off the DBR2), trailing arms and Watt linkage with coil springs
- Length: 14 ft 6 in (442 cm)
- Width: 5 ft 6 in (168 cm)
- Height: 4 ft 2 in (127 cm)
- Axle track: 4 ft 6 in (137 cm)
- Wheelbase: 7 ft 10 in (239 cm)
- Engine: Aston Martin 3,996 cc Straight 6, twin overhead cam, twin plug DB4 GT alloy head, 3 twin choke Weber 50 DCO 330 bhp (246 kW; 335 PS) at 6,000 rpm, 287 lb·ft (389 N·m) 5,300 rpm 167.8 mph (270.0 km/h), 96 x 92 (B/S), 9.6:1 compression, FR Layout
- Transmission: David Brown S532 5 speed synchromesh manual gearbox, in magnesium alloy casing 5-speed Manual, 9" single clutch 3.27 final drive (2.91 in 5th); 7.5" Borg and Beck 3 plate clutch
- Weight: 2,150 lb (980 kg) dry
- Tyres: Dunlop

Competition history
- Notable entrants: (United Kingdom) David Brown
- Notable drivers: (United Kingdom) Graham Hill, (United States) Richie Ginther, (United Kingdom) Mike Salmon, (Belgium) Lucien Bianchi, (France) Jo Schlesser, (United Kingdom) Tiff Needell, (United Kingdom) Martin Brundle
- Debut: 1962 24 Hours of Le Mans

The Aston Martin DP212 was a prototype sports car developed by Aston Martin for use in the 1962 24 Hours of Le Mans.

The car was built on the chassis of a DB4 GT, but featured a streamlined body specifically designed to handle the high speeds of Le Mans. It also featured a 4.0-litre Inline-6-cylinder engine, based on the DB4 GT's 3.7-litre Tadek Marek unit. Following its participation at Le Mans, the car was slightly modified to feature a Kamm tail design, which would later be used on the Aston Martin DB6.

== Racing History ==
=== Le Mans 24 Hour ===
At the 1962 24 Hours of Le Mans, in the hands of Graham Hill and Richie Ginther the DP212 showed great speed, snatching the lead briefly at the start with Hill driving, completing first lap clear of the field. It then held second place for a while, until delayed by an armature failure. It dropped down the order to retire from 9th place, in the sixth hour (after 79 laps) with a number-six piston failure, caused when an oil pump pipe fractured. The car however, was having high-end stability problems and could not cope with the high speeds at Le Mans.

Soon after, the car underwent wind tunnel tests at M.I.R.A. (Motor Industry Research Association) at Nuneaton, and a rear spoiler was devised. After development the car would return once more, in testing for the 1963 24 Hours of Le Mans, featuring its new Kamm tail, developed to cope with the high speeds. The car practiced for the race, driven by Lucien Bianchi, Jo Schlesser, Richie Ginther and Bill Kimberley but the car would not compete. Its place would be taken by the newer DP214 and DP215, which effectively replaced DP212.

=== After Le Mans 24 Hour ===
In 1964 DP212 was rebuilt and converted into a road car with registration 'AYN 212B'. The factory fitted the car with a 4,164 cc (254.1 cu in) engine with 98 mm (3.9 in) bore, giving 349 bhp (260 kW; 354 PS) at 6,000rpm. DP212 was entered in a few minor speed and sprint events, driven by Hon. John Dawnay (later Viscount Downe), and Mike Salmon.

=== During the 1970s ===
Aston Martin DP212 had many successful races during the 1970s in the hands of Mike Salmon. In 1973 the project car returned to motor racing and won twice at Silverstone, and once at Castle Combe, all with Salmon at the wheel. Salmon also won the Classic Car Championship in 1974; with five class wins, one overall win and two second places. In 1975 Mike Ottway acquired the car, however Mike Salmon still continued to race the car.

From 1975 to 1979 the car won many races, most significantly at Silverstone, with one first place overall (1975), two first in class results (1977/78) and a third in class (1976). The car also won many times at Brands Hatch, with a first and second overall in 1977 and 1976 respectively and two first places (1977/78). The car also recorded a 2nd place, in the Group 4 historic Race at the Houbigant meeting at Brands Hatch on 15 May 1977. When Salmon and DP212 demonstrated a wet-weather sure-footedness not matched by the later Ford GT40s and Chevron B8s (amongst others) it was up against, being beaten only by a Lola T70. The last significant result of the car in the late 1970s was a second place in class at F.O.C. Goodwood in 1978.

=== During the 1980s ===
In 1981 Mike Salmon won first in class at Brands Hatch, a fifth place at Silverstone and a significant win, against an all Aston Martins field in Dubai again in 1981.

=== During the 1990s ===
It is believed the registration (which it still holds today) of '212 DP' was acquired in the early 1990s. In 1995 DP212 appeared as a static exhibit at the Silverstone Coys meeting, with the car returning to the meeting in 1999 in the Pre '64 GT race. Where the car, driven by Mike Salmon and Gary Pearson, was in second place in 'Part 1' of the event. But during the first lap of 'Part 2', after taking the lead the car retired with Pearson at the wheel.

In 1997 Lord Downe entered DP212 in a Concours event at Pebble Beach, Concours d'Elegance in California.

In 1998 the car took part in the first R.A.C. TT Revival race at Goodwood, however it retired when in 2nd place. The car came back to the Goodwood TT Revival in 1999, with the car put on pole by Martin Brundle in a time of 1.27.635 (not bettered until 2006 after track had been resurfaced) but then crashed in practice by Pearson and therefore did not start (DNS). The crash heavily damaging the front end.

=== During the 2000s ===
In 2000 the car went under a major rebuild due to the crash at Goodwood in 1999, and the car was acquired by Nicolaus Springer. During the restoration, the car was stripped and thoroughly checked. However, there was no chassis damaged, but needed major panel work repair. R S Williams asked Lawrence Kett of G&A fabrications to perform the restoration of the body shell. The repair was difficult as the car was not symmetrical, having been hand built and already showing signs of previous, body damage. It was also noted that the shell was becoming very brittle, being made of thin alloy and being over 40 years old. To add to that, the rear offside wing had been made from a different material, so may have already had some restoration completed on the shell. The restorers retained as much of the original bodywork as possible, reworking it if necessary. They worked from large blown up photographs to set about creating the old shape, complete with the original inaccuracies, asymmetrical dimensions and distortions.

After the rebuild was completed the car has been raced many more times at the Goodwood TT Revival races. In 2000 DP212 finished in fifth place with drivers Tony Dron and Tiff Needell. Averaging 93.24 mph (150.06 km/h), which was only 1.52 mph (2.45 km/h) behind Carroll Shelby's special Cobra Daytona. The car competed again in the 1 hour TT event in 2001.

In 2002 its present owner Wolfgang Friedrichs bought the car. He continued the Goodwood Revival trend, competing in the R.A.C. TT event in 2002, finishing 12th, with drivers Friedrichs and David Clark. Friedrichs and Clark again competed in the same event in 2004, 2005 and 2006. Finishing, with one DNF (2004) and two 10th-place results in 2005 and 2006.

Friedrichs and Clark returned to the Goodwood Revival Tourist Trophy (TT) in September 2009, finishing 9th overall, completing 39 laps within the hour of racing. DP212 recorded an average speed of 91.39 mph (147.08 km/h), with their fastest lap being 1m 31.083s on lap 18.

In 2013 the car, driven by Friedrichs and Simon Hadfield, finally finished 1st in the Revival TT race. Going at a blistering pace through the pack in the second, rain-soaked part of the race.

== Gallery ==
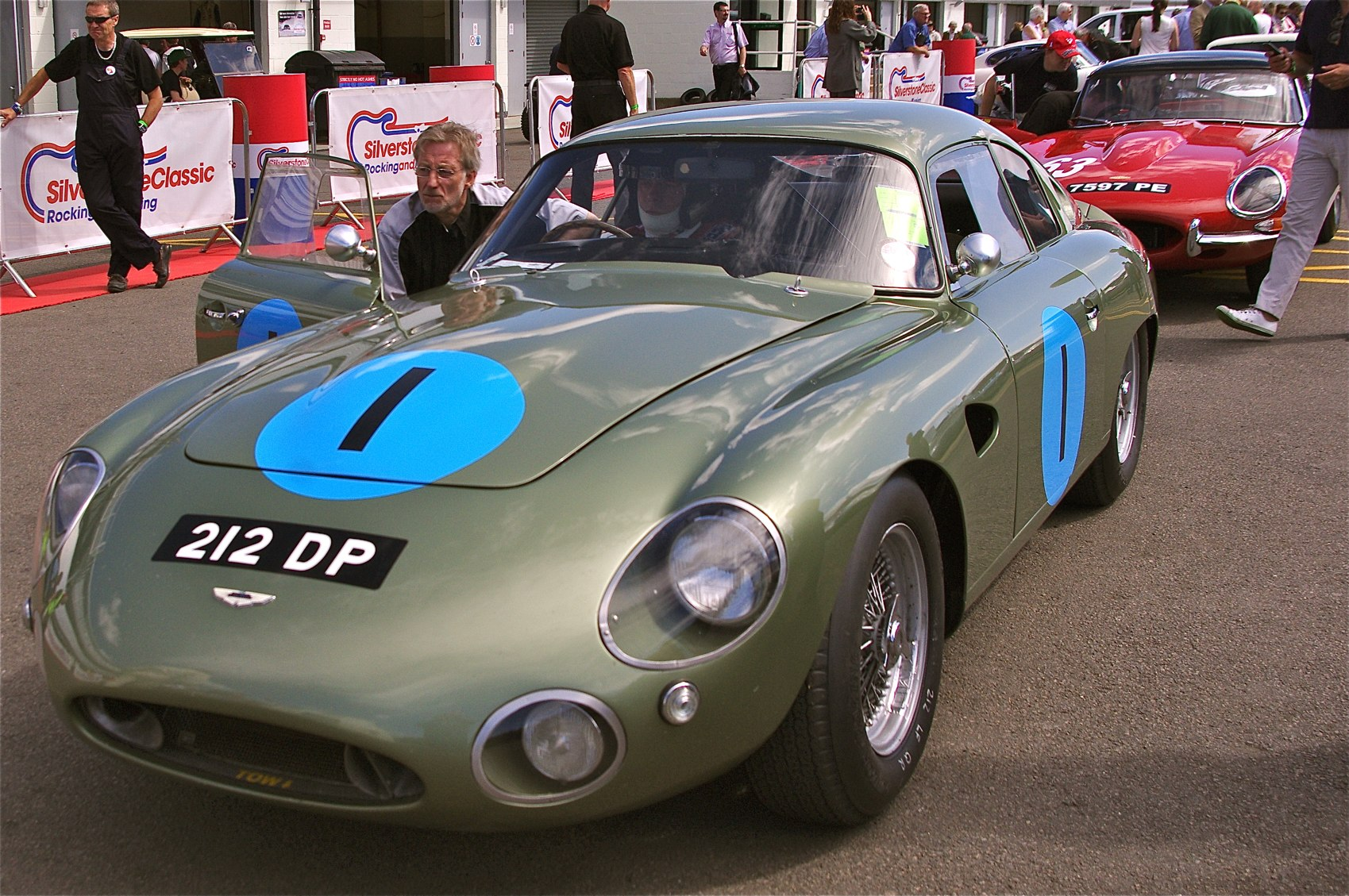
Aston Martin DP212 at Silverstone Classic 2011.
