= Aston Martin DP214 =

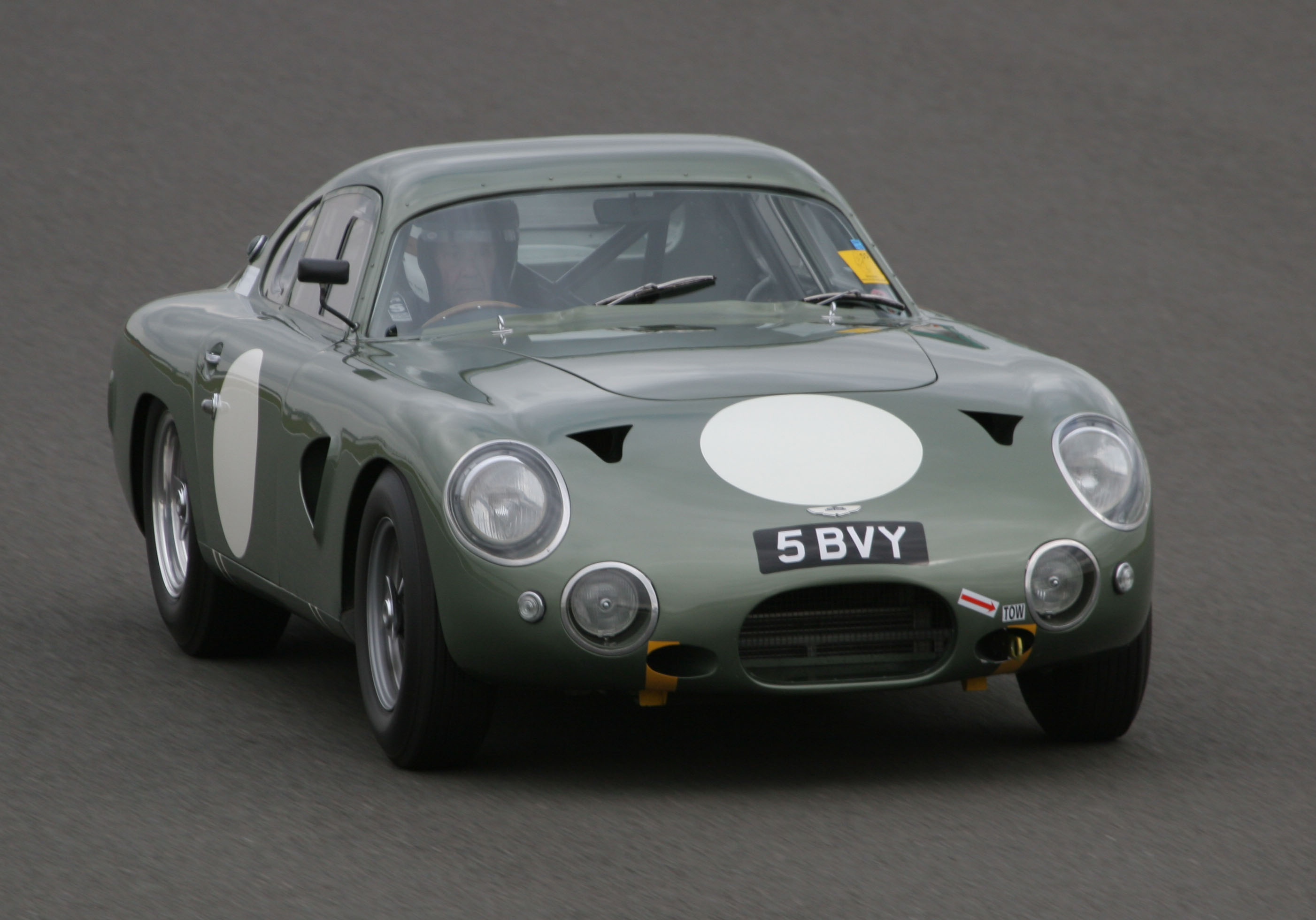
- A DP214 replica

Overview
- Manufacturer: Aston Martin Limited
- Production: 1963 (2 produced)
- Designer: Ted Cutting

Body and chassis
- Class: Grand tourer
- Body style: 2-door Coupe
- Layout: FR layout
- Related: Aston Martin DB4 GT Zagato / Aston Martin DB4

Powertrain
- Engine: 3,995 cc (243.8 cu in) Tadek Marek I6

Chronology
- Predecessor: Aston Martin DP212
- Successor: Aston Martin DP215 (concurrent)

The Aston Martin DP214 was a prototype sports car developed by Aston Martin for use in grand touring-style racing, including the 24 Hours of Le Mans. Two DP214s were built in 1963, with one surviving today.

Just like its predecessor, the DP212, to comply with GT regulations, the DP214 was based on DB4GT chassis, numbers #0194/R and #0195/R. The body was completely redesigned, using elements from the DP212 such as the Kamm tail rear end. The bodywork would be wider than the DP212 though, and the nose would be a completely new design. The DP214 would also use a production Tadek Marek 3.7-litre Inline-6, (bored to 3,750 cc (229 cu in) from 3,670 cc (224 cu in)) unlike the DP212's larger 4.0-litre engine

== Racing history ==
=== 1963 ===
Unlike the DP212, the DP214s would be used in races other than Le Mans. The DP214 made its debut with DP215 at the 1963 24 Hours of Le Mans, Bill Kimberley and Jo Schlesser in 0194 and Bruce McLaren and Innes Ireland in 0195. During practice recording, DP214 set an unofficial time of 3m 58.7s and an official time of 4m 00s, with Ireland recording 300 kilometres per hour (186.4 mph) down the Mulsanne Straight.

The race plan was for 0194 and 0195 to lap at 4m 15s. On lap 28 McLaren in 0195 pitted when leading the GT class and 10th overall. Ireland took over 0195 and took it up to 6th overall but during his stint a piston failed on the Mulsanne Straight on lap 60 (4h 06m) and forced them to retire, which was a result similar to that of the DP212 in 1962. The engine failure resulted in 20 litres of oil being spilled on the track, causing a multiple accident involving Roy Salvadori's Jaguar E-Type lightweight and Jean-Pierre Manzon's René Bonnet Aerodjet LM6. Christian Heins' Alpine M63 Renault was unable to avoid the wreck, swerved out of control, hit another vehicle and spun into a lamp post exploding into flames, killing him instantly.

DP214 0194 had to stop on lap three to unblock a main jet, but had more luck during the race, reaching 5th overall in 110 laps (nearly 8 hours). By 10 hours Kimberley and Schlesser were lying 3rd overall and leading the GT class, however they suffered the same fate as McLaren and Ireland, with a piston failure. That was Aston Martin's last Le Mans of the era. The piston failure was caused by inadequate strength around the underside of the gudgeon-pin boss.

John Wyer records that both cars (as well as DP215) were capable of winning at the Le Mans that year, but their preparation left insufficient time to have forged pistons manufactured so they made do with cast pistons; it was these that failed in the race. Perhaps, another missed opportunity for Aston Martin.

Moving to the Guard's Trophy at Brands Hatch, a lone DP214, driven by Innes Ireland would manage to finish in sixth place overall, and second in class. With the second DP214 (0195) retiring, after spinning off (Kimberley). This was followed by a seventh-place finish and fourth in class in the TT at Goodwood for 0194, with 0195, driven by McLaren retiring after 95 laps with a valve failure. The two cars were certainly capable of winning the TT at Goodwood in the hands of Innes Ireland and Bruce McLaren, but unfortunately they fell foul of the RAC Scrutineer (Procter). He refused to allow the cars to run with the 6.5" inch rims that they had run at Le Mans, because they had not been homologated, even though by then the production cars were fitted with them as standard. As it was, they were required to race with 5.5" inch rims, which actually narrowed the track by 4" inches and ruined their handling. They had never run with these narrow rims in the first place, and were never to do so again. An angry Innes Ireland spent the whole race going luridly sideways in the car which he had originally put on pole.

Next was a victory at the Inter-Europa Cup at Monza driven by Salvadori, setting a new GT lap record, with an average speed of 120.23 mph (193.49 km/h). This race also saw the second DP214 (0195, driven by Bianchi)) take 3rd (119 mph (192 km/h), average speed). The next two rounds at Monthéry would see the DP214s take victory (0194, driven by Claude Le Guezec) and second place (Dewez) in the first race. The second race would also see a DP214 victorious again, this time with 0195 winning (Schlesser) and 0194 (Le Guezec) finishing in fifth.

=== 1964 ===
Following the 1963 season, both DP214s were sold to John Dawnay's racing team for use throughout the international circuit. With 0195 later being sold to Brian Hetreed in 1964. Mike Salmon in 0194 and Hetreed in 0195 took both DP214's to Daytona 2000 km. Salmon with co-driver Roy Salvadori and Hetreed partnered by Chris Kerrison. Both had been up to 5th place during the race. But 0194 retired with value failure and 0195 slipped back to 17th when the gearbox started to seize.

At the International Trophy Silverstone GT race, Salmon broke the GT record (with 0194) in practice with 1m 41.0s but spun in the wet on the first lap. But worked his way back up to take second place overall. Around the same time, Hetreed took DP214 0195 to the Wiscombe hill climb and set a best time.

Both cars then went to Spa 500 km, but both DP214's had engine troubles and neither finished.

Unfortunately, one of the DP214s (0195) was destroyed in an accident during practice at the Nürburgring 1000 km in 1964, killing driver Brian Hetreed. Hetreed crashed on his first practice lap, with the car rolling down a bank at 'Bergwerk' corner. The remains of 0195 were returned to London from Germany and were comprehensively cut up and destroyed. With the engine being repaired and going into an Aston Martin DB4GT Zagato, with chassis number DB4GT/0200/R.

The other lone DP214 finished the season, moving onto Le Mans again. With Peter Sutcliffe and Mike Salmon racing at the 1964 24 Hours of Le Mans. At the end of the first lap DP214 was running in tenth place, dropping to eleventh after half an hour. Early evening pit stops had moved the car up to sixth overall, but again dropped, down to twelfth place. However, after 17h 45m on Sunday morning they were disqualified due to replenishing the car's oil at the wrong time when lying 11th.

In the closing event of 1964, 0194 finished as the first GT car and fifth overall, in the Silverstone Martini meeting, with fastest lap of 1m 42.8s and 4th in class in the Guards Trophy despite a spin at Clearways.

=== Rest of the 1960s ===
In 1965 the sole remaining DP214 was bought by Tom Rose, who painted the car, a very dark blue, possibly black in colour. Rose registered the car with the registration number '5 NBP' (which it still holds today) and then competed the car in Aston Martin events during the next year. Results including a win at Wiscombe Park and at the Belgian Day of Records (Jabbeke Speed Trial) Rose set a best time, with a top speed of 163.5 mph (263.1 km/h). Finally driven by Pye, the car competed at B.A.R.C. Goodwood event, where Pye set a best time.

Colin Crabbe then acquired the car in 1965, with the car now showing flared wheel arches to accommodate wider wheels. In 1966 Crabbe raced the project car at the B.A.R.C. event at Oulton Park and was victorious overall. Crabbe was then second overall in the Monte Cristo Trophy at the AMOC St John Horsfall meeting at Silverstone, second only to Ron Fry's Ferrari 275 LM. Neil Corner also drove DP214 in 1966 and won overall at the Bentley Drivers' Club (B.D.C.).

In 1967 at the Belgian day of Records, Crabbe won again, this time finishing first in class. The final event under Crabbe's ownership was with Neil Corner in the 'Emu Trophy' at Aston Martin Owners Club (AMOC) Silverstone event.

=== During the 1970s ===
After the last race under ownership of Colin Crabbe, Mike Ottway acquired the car with a 3,750 cc (229 cu in) engine installed and a damaged DP215 engine as a spare. After this Nick Cussons raced the car regularly, but it is unclear whether Cussons owned the car during this time. In 1973 Cussons won first in class at Curborough, and was again first in class at the Jaguar Drivers' Club (JDC). Cussons was also first overall in the B.R.S.C.C. at Snetterton, also in 1973. In its last outing of the era, Cussons was third in class at B.A.R.C at Thruxton in 1974. During this period Nick Cussons also raced the car in his own Cussons Post-Historic Championship. On the 31st of May of 1975, the car participated in Belgium in the "Vliegende en Staande Kilometer" organised by the Royal Automobile Club of Flanders (www.racf.be). In this race, the goal was to drive as fast as possible on a standing or rolling kilometre, driven on public roads just outside of Ghent. The car was driven by Richard Tindell.

=== Restoration period ===
During the period of 1974/5 to 1992 the project car underwent a full restoration by Mike Ottway. The car was then acquired by Simon Draper. Presumably this was when the car was returned to its original colour, which it still has today. Simon Draper owns the car to date.

=== During the 1990s ===
The car reappeared after its long restoration in 1992 and raced again with Draper at Silverstone in 1994 in the Coy's Historic Festival. DP214 then raced at the Goodwood Festival of Speed in 1995, driven by Ian Mason. The car competed again at the Silverstone Coy's meeting in 1995 and 1996 with Draper and Gary Pearson finishing second overall in 1995 (after being on pole in part one of the GT Race). With Draper and Mark Hales again finishing second in 1996 in the GT race.

In 1997, Simon Draper entered DP214 into the Concours d'Elegance at Pebble Beach in California.

In 1998 and 1999 Draper joined by David Clark entered the Coy's Historic Festival at Silverstone again, finishing 13th (1998) and 9th (1999) in the pre '64 GT Race.

Again in 1998 and 1999 Draper and Clark competed the DP214 in the Goodwood Revival Meeting R.A.C. Tourist Trophy Celebration Race. In 1998 they finished a very respectable fourth overall and finished 6th overall in 1999. Also at Goodwood in 1999, DP214 competed at the Goodwood Festival of Speed event, and Gillian Goldsmith finished first in class.

In 1999 the Aston Martin featured in the Aston Martin Lagonda Limited official calendar.

The original DP214 could now be worth anything in excess of 7 figures, having been sold in 1993 for in excess of £1,000,000.

=== 2012 crash ===
The car was involved in an accident at the 2012 Goodwood Revival. Extensive damage occurred when the car hit a tyre wall at speed.

=== Replica Cars ===
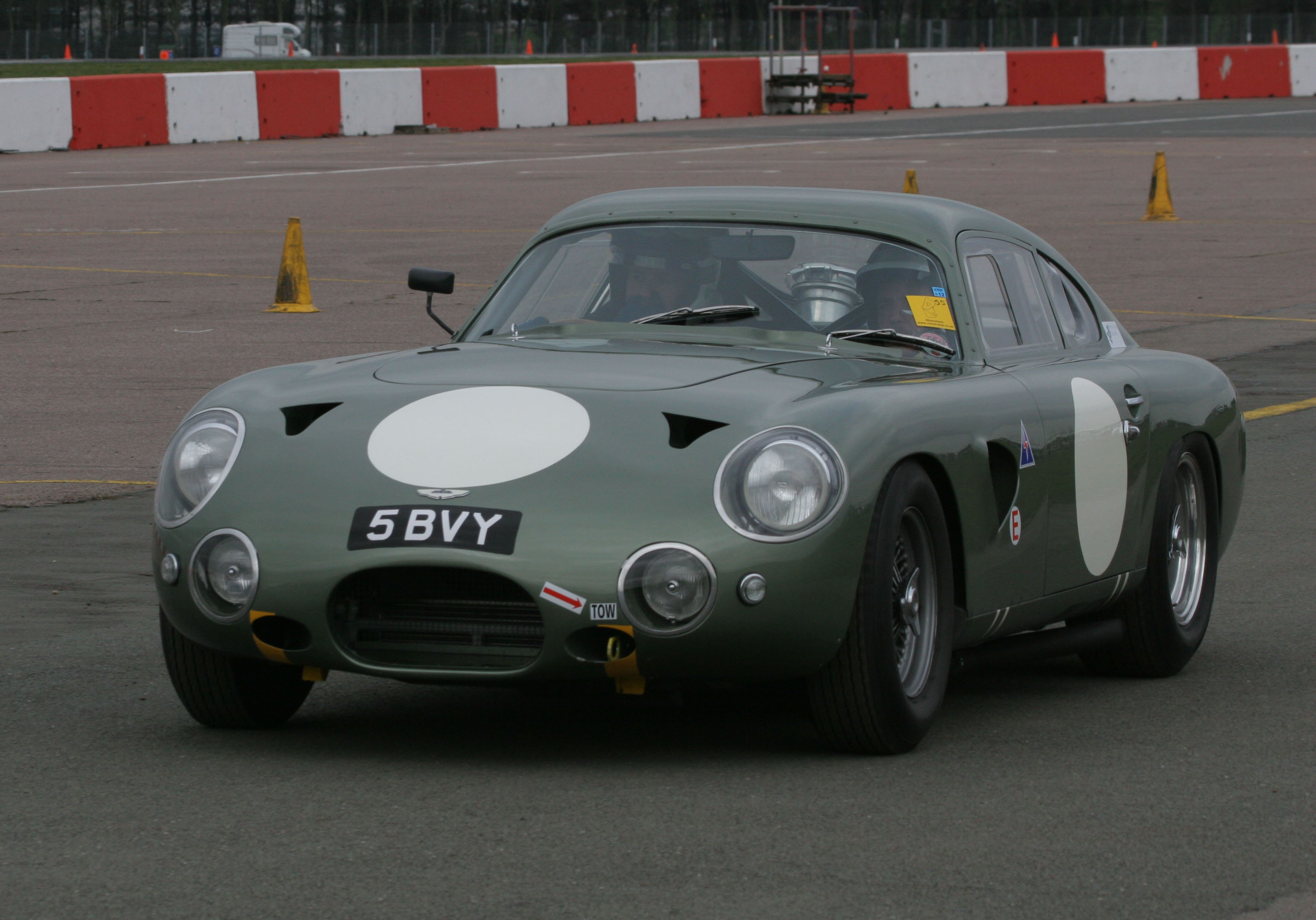
An Aston Martin DP214 replica, 5 BVY

There are three known, replica DP214s supposedly based on DB4 and DB4GT chassis. The first, initially claiming to be built up from some parts of the crashed 214/0195/R, was commissioned by American Ken Lawrence with a body built by Shapecraft, using the surviving DP214 as a template. Lawrence said he had found a cross-member showing the correct chassis number, in Germany, in late 1979. He also claimed he had found an engine of 0195 which had raced at Le Mans, but this engine was scrapped due to a large 3" inch hole in the block. The car had been built up with contemporary Aston Martin parts, with a DB4GT engine (notably stamped 370/0195/GT), and gearbox. The body, which was crafted by Shapecraft, bears a fairly close resemblance to the original, but the similarities end there; there is no evidence that this car contains any significant authentic components. Therefore, this car is aptly deemed a modern recreation, which aesthetically shares a large resemblance to the original DP214.

This replica is currently owned by Wolfgang Friedrichs (who also owns DP212) and which has had a good record in the Spa 6 hour races, of two overall second places (2004 & 2006) and an overall victory in 2005.

The second car is much more recently built by Martin Brewer of Runnymede Motor Company, but the build was apparently started (according to the Aston Martin Owners Club) alongside the aforementioned replica. It was built up using DB4/559/L as the basis. Completed in 2005, it was given the registration number ‘DSL 449’, but has since been re-registered as ‘5 BVY’ in order that it might closely resemble the surviving, original car: ‘5 NBP’. This car has appeared at the Le Mans Legends race on 16 June 2007.

The third replica DP214 was commissioned by Robert Rawe and was completed in late 2013. This car competed in the Spa 6 hours event in the same year.

== Specification for Le Mans 24 Hour 1963 ==
	DP214 DB4GT/0194/R	DP214 DB4GT/0195/R
Overall Length	14 ft 6 in (442 cm)	14 ft 6 in (442 cm)
Width	5 ft 6 in (168 cm)	5 ft 6 in (168 cm)
Height	4 ft 2 in (127 cm)	4 ft 2 in (127 cm)
Wheelbase	7 ft 10 in (239 cm)	7 ft 10 in (239 cm)
Weight	2,150 lb (980 kg)	2,150 lb (980 kg)
Engine	3750 cc Straight Six 1 mm (0.0 in) Overbore, mounted 8.5" further back than standard Jaguar E Type Radiator	3750 cc Straight Six 1 mm (0.0 in) Overbore, mounted 8.5" further back than standard, Standard DB4 head, Jaguar E Type Radiator
Bore/Stroke	93 mm (3.7 in) x 92 mm (3.6 in)	93 mm (3.7 in) x 92 mm (3.6 in)
Transmission	David Brown S432 4 Speed manual gearbox	David Brown S432 4 Speed manual gearbox
Compression	9.15	9.3
Carburetors	Three 'Weber' 50 DCO	Three 'Weber' 45 DCOE (Changed to 50 DCO)
Max. Power	310 bhp (231 kW; 314 PS) at 6,000 rpm, increased to 314 bhp (234 kW; 318 PS) (For 1963 24 Hours of Le Mans, Wyer quotes 317 bhp (236 kW; 321 PS) at 6000rpm.	300 bhp (224 kW; 304 PS) at 5,800 rpm, increased to 310 bhp (231 kW; 314 PS) (with changed carburettors)
Max. Speed	approx. 186 mph (299 km/h)	approx. 175 mph (282 km/h)
Weight	2,121 lb (962 kg)	2,121 lb (962 kg)
Steering	Rack and pinion	Rack and pinion
Chassis	Separate steel platform type with tubular steel frame, 4" x 2" 16 swg steel channel	Separate steel platform type with tubular steel frame, 4" x 2" 16 swg steel channel
Body	Kamm tail as of DP212, but longer nose and smaller air intake than DP212 Drilled box section frame with aluminium flooring, Magnesium and aluminium bodied coupe, NACA ducts by front headlights	Kamm tail as of DP212, but longer nose and smaller air intake than DP212 Drilled box section frame with aluminium flooring, Magnesium and aluminium bodied coupe, NACA ducts by front headlights
Axle	4HA axle (was 7HA), Shortened Salisbury back axle with limited-slip differential (LSD)	4HA axle (was 7HA), Shortened Salisbury back axle with LSD
Suspension	Smaller anti-roll bar than DP212	Smaller anti-roll bar than DP212
Brakes	'Girling' 12 in (304.8 mm) discs front, 11.7 in (297.2 mm) rear	'Girling' 12 in (304.8 mm) discs front, 11.7 in (297.2 mm) rear
Wheels	'Borrani' 16" centre lock wire wheels	'Borrani' 16" centre lock wire wheels
Tyres	6L/6.5L x 16 with R5 and R6 'Dunlop' tyres up to 7.00 x 16 R5's on the rear	6L/6.5L x 16 with R5 and R6 'Dunlop' tyres up to 7.00 x 16 R5's on the rear
