= Aston Martin DP215 =

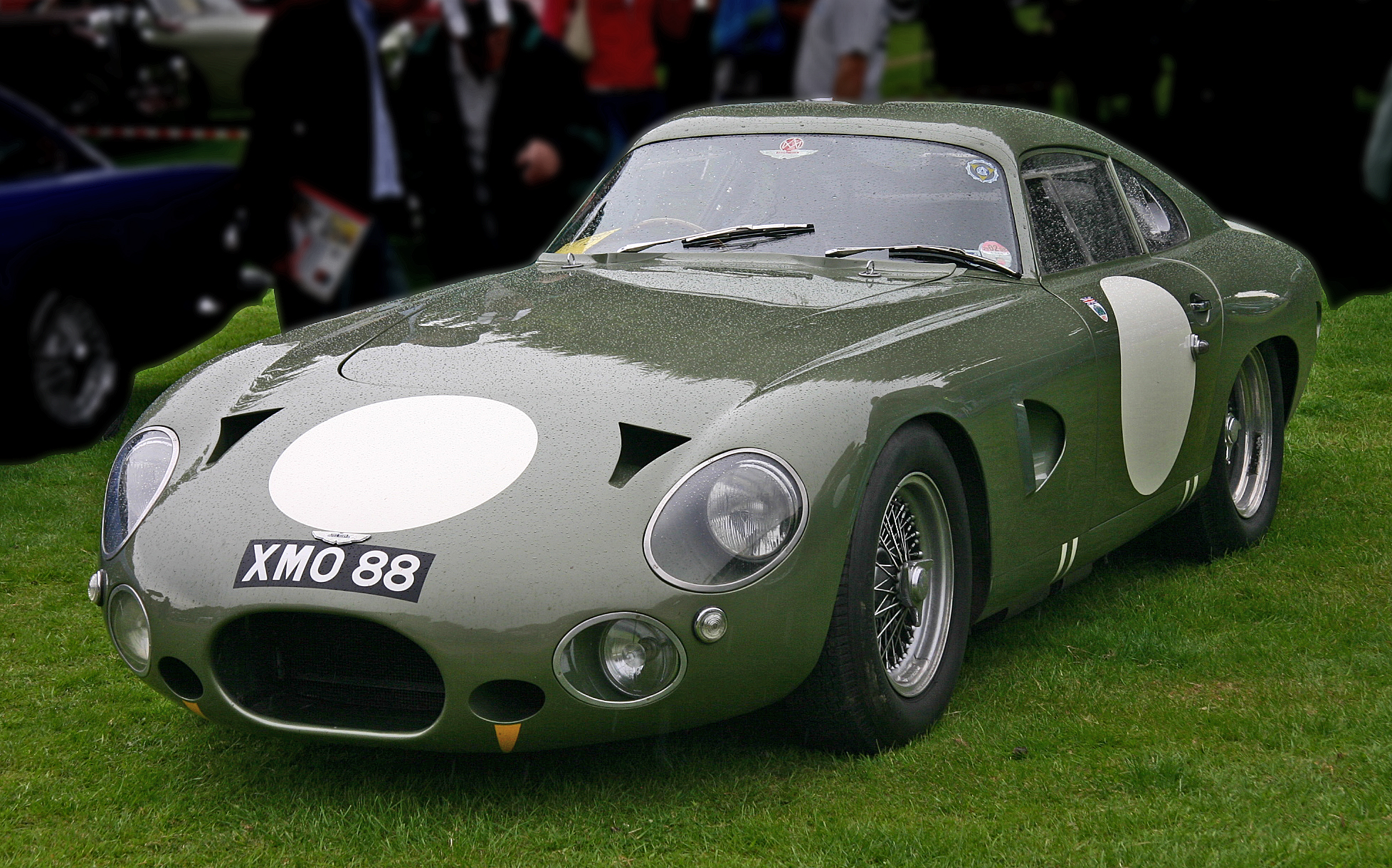
- The sole DP215 following restoration after two accidents during its lifetime
- Category: Le Mans Racer Sports car racing
- Constructor: Aston Martin Lagonda LTD
- Designer(s): Ted Cutting

Technical specifications
- Chassis: Lightweight tubular steel frame, drilled steel box section, alloy floor panels, Mag/alu alloy bodied, NACA ducts, Plexiglass side/rear windows (with air ducts), Front screen the same as the DB4GT Zagato
- Suspension (front): Fully adjustable unequal wishbones and coil springs, back to front lower wishbones (shorter than DP214's)
- Suspension (rear): Fully independent wide based unequal length wishbones, double wishbone layout
- Length: 14 ft 6 in (442 cm)
- Width: 5 ft 6 in (168 cm)
- Height: 4 ft 0 in (122 cm)
- Axle track: Front 4 ft 7 in (140 cm); Rear 4 ft 7 in (140 cm)
- Wheelbase: 7 ft 10 in (239 cm)
- Engine: Aston Martin 3,996 cc Straight 6, twin overhead cam, aluminium head, 3 Weber 50 DCO, 323 bhp (241 kW; 327 PS) at 6,000 rpm (Although John Wyer quotes 323 bhp (241 kW; 327 PS) @ 6000 rpm for the 1963 Le Mans), 198.6 mph (319.6 km/h), 96 x 92 (B/S), 9:1 Compression; Later changed to a 4,164 cc engine, 98 x 92 (B/S), 10.5 FR Layout
- Transmission: David Brown CG537 synchromesh in magnesium alloy casting 5-speed Manual, 9" single clutch David Brown 8.25" spiral bevel
- Weight: 2,219 lb (1,007 kg) dry

Competition history
- Notable entrants: (United Kingdom) David Brown
- Notable drivers: (United States) Phil Hill, (Belgium) Lucien Bianchi, (France) Jo Schlesser
- Debut: 1963 24 Hours of Le Mans

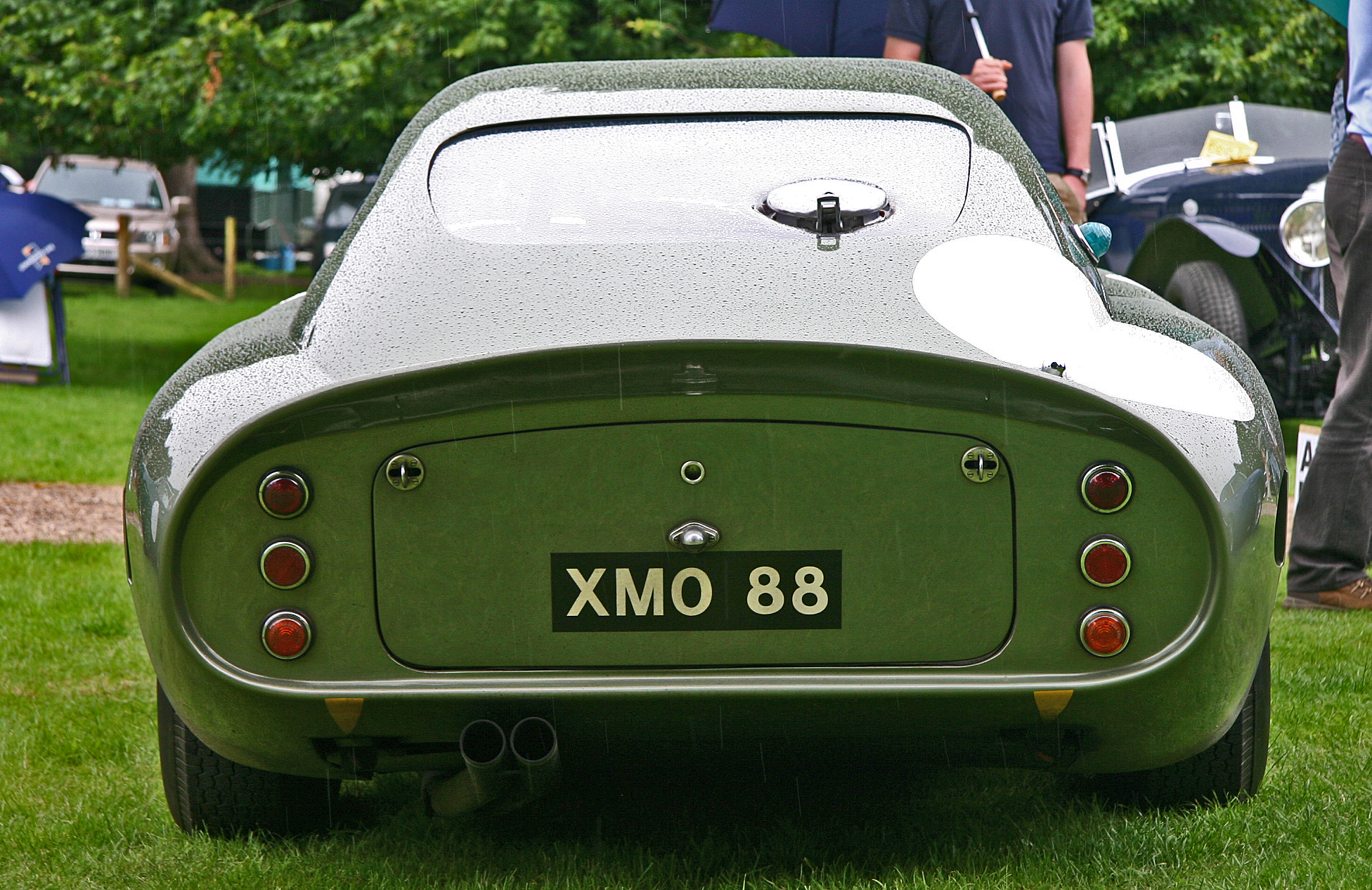
The Kamm tail design on the DP215

The Aston Martin DP215 is a prototype sports car built by Aston Martin for grand touring-style racing in 1963. It was built alongside the similar DP214, both of which replaced the previous DP212. Only a single example was built, which survives today.

Again using a DB4GT chassis, the DP215 was stylistically similar to the DP214, but had the advantage of not only being slightly lighter, but also using the larger 4.0-litre Tadek Marek Inline-6-cylinder engine which had previously powered DP212. Even though the car was also intended to carry the Tadek Marek designed 5-litre V8 engine, which later appeared in the Lola Aston T70 MkIII. Even so, with this increased power and decreased weight, the DP215 was seen as better suited to Le Mans' Mulsannes straight than the DP214.

The DP215 was sold at RM Sotheby's 2018 Monterey auction for $21,455,000 including buyer's fee.

== Racing History ==
=== Early history ===
The car never had the ‘planned’ V8 fitted and it made do with a dry sump 4-litre version of the well-proven 6-cylinder, with twin plug head. More contentiously, it was also fitted with the weakest link from the older and lower-powered DBR1, its CG537 5-speed transaxle; clearly a big mistake and one admitted by John Wyer. Visually, and dimensionally, the body was the same as the DP214s but the bonnet line was 1.5 inches lower, enabled by the dry sump engine. The car was initially fitted with engine no. 400/215/1.

=== Le Mans 24 Hour 1963 ===
Debuting at the 1963 24 Hours of Le Mans, the lone DP215, driven by Lucien Bianchi and Phil Hill, started alongside the two DP214s. During practice the DP215 set a time of 3m 57.2s with Hill. During the race the DP215 was intended to be the ‘hare’ for the DP214s, trying to break the Ferraris, lapping at 4m 05s. Hill led away at the start but was passed by a Maserati on the Mulsanne Straight. On the sixth lap Hill was in fifth place, but unavoidably ran over debris from an accident of a car, who was about to be lapped. Hill pitted so the mechanics could see if any damage had been caused to the under carriage, but no damage was found and Hill was sent out again.

However, during the third hour (2hr 12m) after 29 laps, DP215 retired from the race whilst running ninth. The transmission had broken and the teeth on the input bevel failed; it was assumed that the extra torque of the 4-litre engine was responsible, as this had never happened to the DBR cars. Both DP214 cars would also suffer problems and be forced to retire. However, both DP214 and DP215, were the first cars officially recorded as exceeding 300 km/h (186 mph) down the Mulsanne. But, DP215 was the quickest of all. Phil Hill, in practice had been recorded at 319.6 km/h (198.6 mph) and Ted Cutting, the Aston Martin designer, is certain that DP215 had, in fact, exceeded 200 mph (320 km/h), since the timing was recorded before the cars had reached their maximum speed or the braking area. The car still remains the fastest front engined Aston Martin ever made, with Phil Hill describing the car as light and controllable at such speeds down the straight.

=== After Le Mans 24 Hour ===
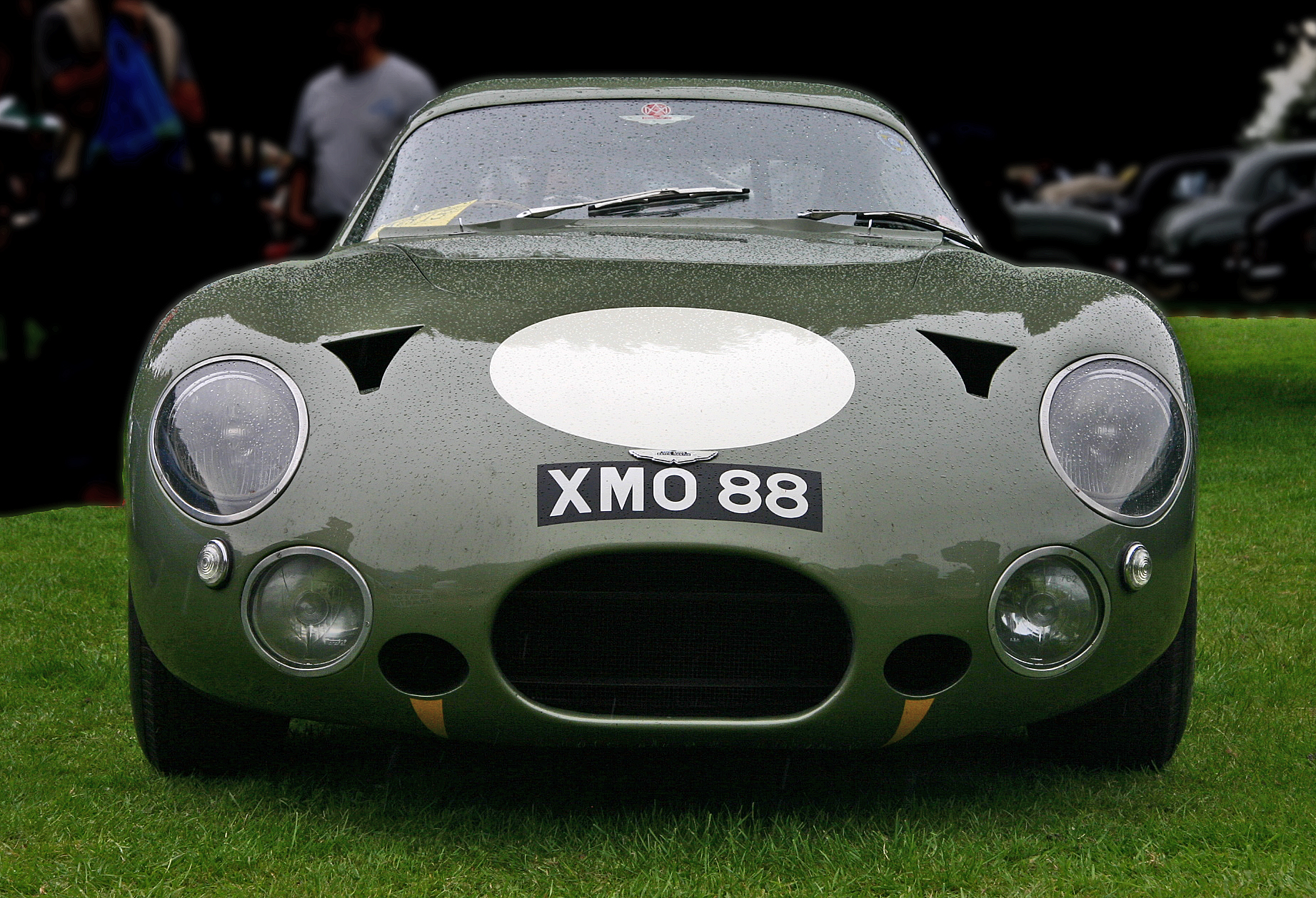
DP215's front profile, showing triangular NACA ducts and large air intakes

Following Le Mans, the DP215 appeared at the 12 Hours of Reims (a race accompanying the French GP), driven by Jo Schlesser. The car should have won easily, due to no serious opposition in the field. But after leading, Schlesser was having more trouble with the repaired CG537 transmission. Having difficulty changing gear, and missing gears, which caused over-revving of the engine, leading to bending all the valves, forcing the car to retire on lap 4.

At the Guards Trophy at Brands Hatch, the car only completed a demonstration lap (driven by Bill Kimberley), due to financial/tax reasons. Shortly after the DP215 was rebuilt with more conventional transmission which allowed the fitting of the David Brown S532 5-speed box, which was also in the DP212. The car was soon retired from factory use as the DP214's proved more reliable.

In 1966, whilst being driven/tested on the M1 Motorway, DP215 was involved in an accident which badly damaged the car (at this time it carried the reg. no 'ENP 246B'). Whilst travelling at about 100 mph (160 km/h) on the motorway a slower Dormobile wandered out into the outside lane, with the Aston Martin unable to avoid a collision. Both vehicles were severely damaged but all occupants were unhurt. Aston Martin, not wishing to gain publicity over the accident, quickly sold the damaged engine and the remains of the car. The engine-less car was bought for scrap value, by Malcolm Calvert, from the Isle of Wight, who then began restoring it.

=== During the 1960s ===
The car was rebuilt using a spare DP214/DP215 body and a dash, bought from the factory, with a DB6 engine planned to be installed, as the original engine had by then been fitted to DP214 (DB4GT/0194/R). The rare S532 gearbox had gone missing (possibly back as a spare to DP212) so, at this time a ZF gearbox, similar to those fitted to the V8 road cars was used to keep the car running. However the car was badly constructed, with the chassis still bent and the body shell being fitted to match this bent chassis. More inaccuracies were that the headlight openings were incorrect and the dry sump system was put in the wrong place. Finally, the car was fitted with Cobra wire wheels (not original Borrani) and not to mention the DB6 engine used.

=== Restoration period ===
The repaired car was then acquired by Nigel Dawes at a Sotheby's auction at Donington Park in April 1978. Dawes left the car as it was for several years, but hoped to get hold of the original engine which was sold on after the crash, but this had ended up being a spare for DP214 and converted to wet sump. Dawes then bought a 12 plug head, like the original and by luck obtained a 4.2-litre engine (engine no. 1293/420/2) taken from the Indianapolis Cooper-Aston in America. Forward Engineering then restored the engine remaking the dry sump system close to the original. Rubery Owen repaired the chassis based on the original drawings. Both the chassis and engine were then sent to Andy Chapman of Chapman Spooner who restored the engine to its former glory. With the engine producing 345 bhp (257 kW; 350 PS) at 5,750 rpm (330 lbs/ft of torque) and three 50 DCO Weber carburettors were sourced and added at great expense. Also, a lighter version of a 5-speed gearbox was fitted in the place of the ZF gearbox. The body shell was restored by Dawes with help of the original designer of the Le Mans series of cars, Ted Cutting. With a new roll cage being incorporated and a new fuel tank made as a copy of the original.

The interior was restored similar to the original, but this time there were a few differences. The gearbox was insulated and covered in leather, pockets had been built into the doors and a speedometer and electric fan was added for legality. Also Dawes bought another set of seats from the DP215 and matched the faded original cloth; he was none the wiser about where the second set of seats came from.

=== During the 1990s ===
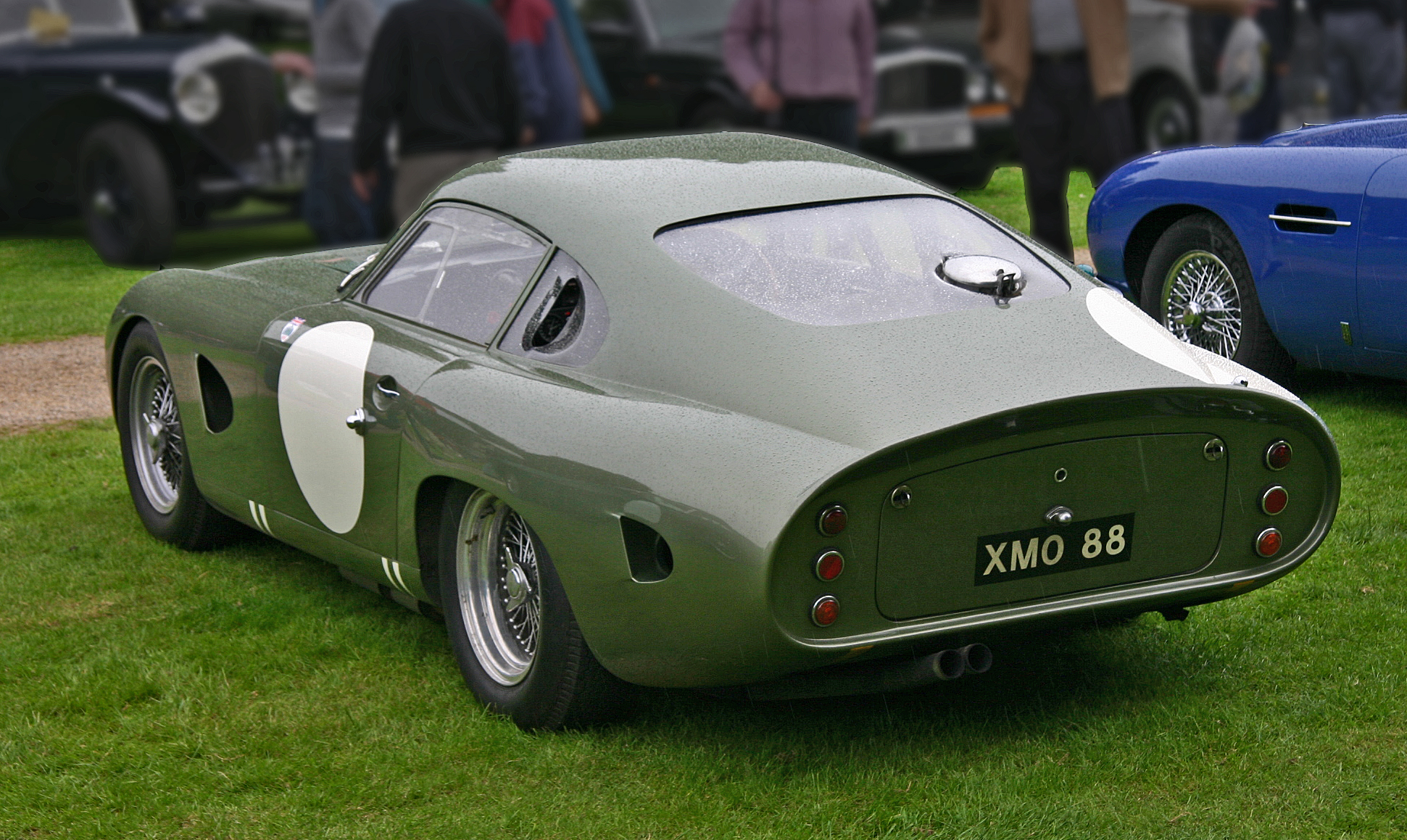
DP215 XMO 88's side profile

The 11 year restoration was completed in May 1991 and the car reappeared at a number of public events, but not raced. It was then that the car acquired the registration number’ XMO 88’. Soon after the car took part in the Ecurie Eccosse Tour. The car was then entered into the Louis Vuitton Concours at the Hurlingham Club, in London by Dawes and won first in class and was second overall. In June the car went to Le Mans and took part in the Historic Parade. The car was then paraded around the Goodwood circuit by Roy Salvadori and Willie Green. DP215 then went to Italy and took part in the Motoring Tour with 40 other exotic cars. Later the project car was on the Aston Martin Owners Club (AMOC) exhibit at the NEC in Birmingham at the Classic Car Show.

In 1995 Dawes entered DP215 in the Goodwood Festival of Speed, which was the last outing of the car with Nigel Dawes. In 1996 the car was acquired by Anthony (Tony) J . Smith and again appeared at the Goodwood Festival of Speed. In 1997 Smith then entered at the Pebble Beach Concours d'Elegance in California. DP215 was entered again at the Goodwood Festival of Speed, this time with the Earl of Arundel at the wheel, and the car recorded the fastest time in the 24 Hour Heroes Part 2. Later that year DP215 went to the Silverstone Coy’s Festival but crashed during the practice session with Smith driving.

=== During the 2000s ===
In 2000 at the Goodwood TT Revival the car finished 15th in the R.A.C. 1hr event with drivers of Tony Smith and Joachim Folch. Around 2002, the project was acquired by Neil Corner, who swapped a precious F1 car in a deal for DP215. Corner then went to the great expense of having a brand new S532 gearbox built from scratch by Crosthwaite and Gardner, using the box from DP212 as the basis. As only 6 of the original S532 were ever made, with two going into the DBR2’s, two into the works racing Lagonda’s, one to DP212 and the missing one, which miraculously disappeared after the crash on the M1.

Corner consulted Ted Cutting throughout and with the help of Richard Williams, who also looks after DP212. Williams got consent from the owner of DP212 to clone the gearbox, but with over 1000 parts in the gearbox it was not an easy task for Crosthwaite and Gardner. However, the task was quickly completed and the gearbox was fitted with some alteration to the car, as this had been altered to accommodate the ZF gearbox. There were a few problems with the box, with the synchromesh not being perfect, sometimes dropping out of third gear on the overrun and once locking in fifth gear. But these problems were not serious and the cloning of the box was a success.

In 2006 DP215 reappeared at the Goodwood Revival as part of the tribute to Phil Hill, in the Phil Hill Commemoration demonstration driven by Nigel Corner.
