= Ted Cutting =

Edward John 'Ted' Cutting (11 October 1926 – 22 March 2012) was a British automotive engineer. He designed the body, engine, chassis, suspension and fully engineered the Aston Martin DBR1, winner of the 1959 24 Hours of Le Mans.

== Early life ==
Cutting was born in Clapham, London and educated at Kingston Technical School.

== Career ==
Cutting began his career aged 15 as a draughtsman with the KLG spark plug company. In 1946 he joined the Allard Motor Company where he designed his first complete car and in 1949 moved to Aston Martin. On joining Aston Martin he took part in the DB2 re-design and worked with Eberan von Eberhorst on DB3, DB3S and DP Lagonda V12 cars. In 1955 became Chief Designer for racing cars, producing the DBR1, DBR2 and DBR3 sports racing cars and the DBR4 and DBR5 Formula One cars. In 1961 he became Chief Designer for the company with Tadek Marek the Chief Engineer and Harold Beech the Technical Director, all working together under John Wyer and ultimately David Brown. From 1962 as Chief Designer his Project racing cars DP212, DP214 and DP215 were conceived purely as prototype racing cars, particularly for long-distance races, unique vehicles to gain maximum publicity. DP215 was recorded at 319.6 km/h (198.6 mph) on the Mulsanne Straight in practice at Le Mans and remains the fastest 6 cylinder front engine Aston ever made.

After leaving Aston Martin in the early 1960s, he joined the Glacier Bearing Company designing large bearings for steam turbines and was named on Company patents.

In 1966 he joined the Ford Motor Company as a race car design engineer and initially began work on the GT40 racing project with John Wyer at Advanced Vehicles in Slough. Circumstances changed so he was asked to join Ford of Britain in advanced chassis engineering at the beginning of the Capri project and then working through advanced pre-production on all car models up to the Granada, introducing many innovations along the way. During the latter stages of his career at Ford he was engaged in working at relationships within the Governments of Europe and The Common Market on the development international motor vehicle construction law. He remained with the company until his retirement in 1985.

== Retirement ==
During retirement he was often engaged as a consultant on technical and legal matters including a return to Aston Martin advising Victor Gauntlett on several projects. As an automotive engineer he was extremely proud to have been made an associate member of the British Racing Drivers Club and a full Fellow of The Institution of Mechanical Engineers, he wrote many technical papers and automotive articles with lectures that were always informative and entertaining.

In 2008 Stuart Bailey and Brian Joscelyne, both creative professionals and active members within the Aston Martin Owners Club, persuaded Cutting to verbally record his story and put the record straight for the Club archives, as he had been reluctant to write an autobiography. From these extensive audio tapes when transcribed, they formed the basis of a book covering eight decades, which once Cutting personally edited and gave access to his previously written articles, documents, illustrations and many original photos, a comprehensive book under his total control was produced, with his full consent to publish just prior to his demise. The 268 page book (self published), titled Cutting Edge Conversations includes a DVD of a full IMECHE lecture on Racing Astons in 2003 given by Cutting. The limited edition, heavy A4 volume is exclusive to the Aston Martin Heritage Trust.
