= Christian Heins =

Brazilian racing driver

- Born: January 16, 1935 São Paulo, Brazil
- Died: June 15, 1963 (aged 28) Le Mans, France
- Years active: 1954–1963

Previous series
- 24 Hours of Le Mans; Sports Cars

Christian Heins (January 16, 1935 – June 15, 1963) known as "Bino", was a Brazilian sports car racing driver.

== Life ==
Heins was born in São Paulo, Brazil, to a Brazilian entrepreneur and an Italian mother. His maternal grandfather taught him to drive. He completed a course for foreigners at Mercedes-Benz at Stuttgart and began his racing career at age 19.

== Career ==
Early in his career, Heins was nicknamed "Comet" because he was faster than several of his more successful opponents. His first major event was the Mille Miglia in 1956 with Eugenio Martins. The race ended the next year after the death of Alfonso de Portago. In 1958, Heins survived a crash during the sports car version of the Belgian Grand Prix. His car hit a stack of hay bales, became airborne, flipped and slid with his upper body exposed. He suffered only minor injuries.

On returning to Brazil in 1960, Heins found that his trophies did not have a formal bill of sale and had been confiscated. Infuriated, his sister wrote to Brazilian president Juscelino Kubitschek, asking for the trophies to be returned.

Heins, along with his friend Chico Landi, won the Mil Milhas Brasil race later that year with a FNM JK. He won many races in this car between 1960 and 1962. Long distance races became more popular than sprints and soon Heins' influence formed the Willys team and created the Alpine based Willys Interlagos. Heins and his team soon started winning every race they entered. Christian was recognized as one of Brazil's greatest drivers of the early 1960s. Eventually, the Interlagos and Willys were taken by Simca, then Ford, Chrysler and VW before closing in 1968.

== Death ==
Heins was invited to race an Alpine M63 Renault in the 1963 24 Hours of Le Mans and accepted, even though he was planning to retire. The car was painted with longitudinal bands of green and yellow and was equipped with a 996 cc (60.8 cu in) engine. Jose Rosinski was his co-driver. However, five hours into the race, the engine of the Bruce McLaren/Innes Ireland Aston Martin DP214 blew up, causing 20 liters of oil to be spilled on the track. Drivers Ninian Sanderson and Mike Salmon avoided the oil, but not Roy Salvadori; his Jaguar E-Type lightweight spun on the oil, became airborne, landed on its roof and burst into flames. Jean-Pierre Manzon in his René Bonnet Aerodjet LM6 hit the Jaguar and stopped in the middle of the track. Heins, who was leading his class at the time, was unable to avoid the wreck, swerved out of control and hit another vehicle. His car then spun into a lamp post and exploded into flames. Manzon and Salvadori were injured, but survived. Heins died at the scene from severe burns and massive head injuries.

Heins was interred at the Cemetery of Redentor in São Paulo on 27 June 1963.
