= Royal Automobile Club of Flanders =

Local car club branch of the Royal Automobile Club of Belgium

The Royal Automobile Club of Flanders (RACF) is a Belgian automobile club that was founded in Ghent on February 24, 1899, as the Automobile Club des Flandres. It promotes car ownership, road maintenance and hosts events celebrating historical vehicles.

== History ==
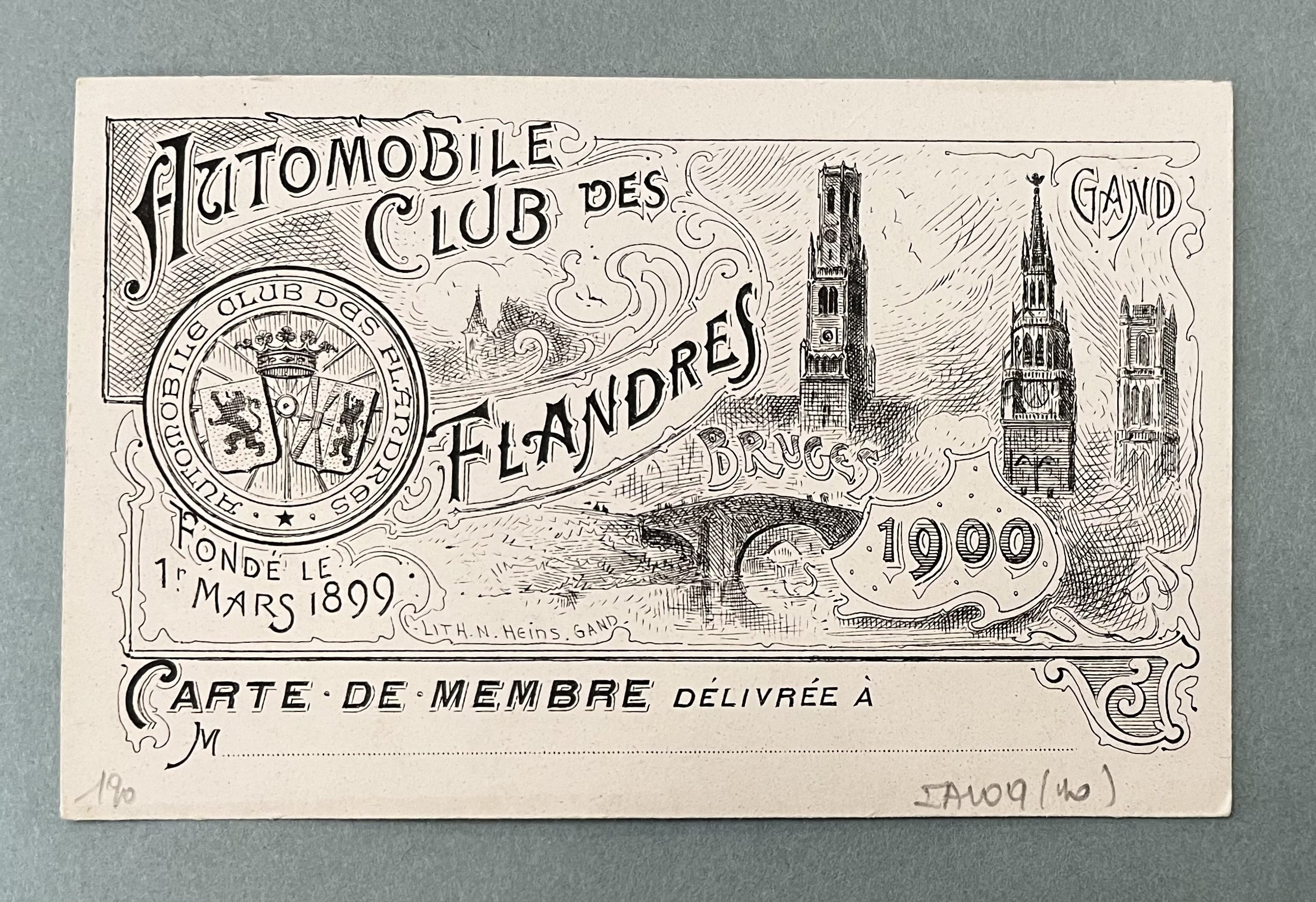
Membership card of the Royal Automobile Club of Flanders

The RACF began as an independent local branch of the Royal Automobile Club of Belgium, with the goal of stimulating car ownership across Belgium. Most other local branches were dissolved in the interwar period.

In addition to promoting car ownership, the club's founding document described other goals like encouraging road repair and construction, providing assistance with customs papers, and increasing the accessibility to and study of tourism, sports, and the automobile industry.

In the early 20th century, cars were an expensive luxury that could only be afforded by wealthy citizens. This meant the RACF's membership largely consisted of nobility or industrial leaders. This changed during the history of the club as car membership became more common.

In 1924, King Albert I endorsed the renaming of the club by adding the word "royal" to the beginning.

== Activities ==
The RACF has organised different automobile-focused activities in the past, like car rallies, Concours d'Élegance (vehicle display events), and races.

In 1902, a race was organised on the road to a castle in Varsenare. This race was re-enacted 120 years later with historic cars and motorbikes from that era.

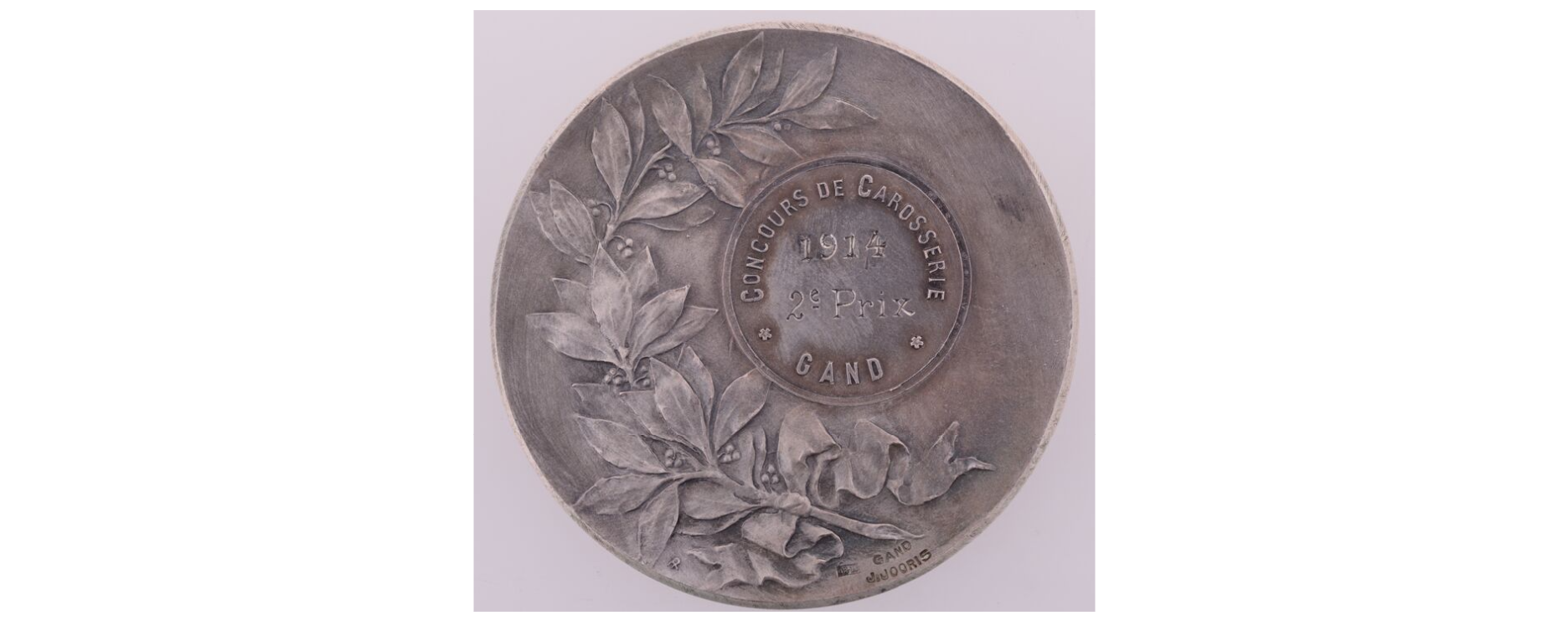
Silver medal in the bodywork competition category of 1914

Other activities were Rallye-Ballons, in which cars followed air balloons and be the first to arrive when the balloon landed.

The Grand Fête de l'Automobile was a yearly event organised from 1904 to 1914 to promote automobiles and driving skills in general, such as balancing on scales and driving backward through an obstacle course.

After World War I, the Club slowly began hosting activities. Several touristic rallies were organised, but the club was mostly known as being the official location to receive your Belgian international driving license.

In 1959 and onwards, the club began routinely hosting events, such as Slaloms, Spring Rally, and Sprints.

From 1967 to 1976 the Standing and Rolling Kilometer was organised on the outskirts of Ghent. On the Kennedy Avenue, a part of the road was closed off to normal traffic. Participants could test the top speed of their cars. From the start of the event, a delegation of British drivers participated every year with their Bentleys, Jaguars or Aston Martins. The race also featured the Napier Bentley and Aston Martin DP214. Over time, the event's popularity soared. In 1976, famed racecar driver Derek Bell brought his hyperformance car used in the Le Mans race. Although no accident occurred, the event was not given permission to host the event afterwards.

The focus then shifted to the Sprint race of Zingem. From 1978 to 1992 a Sprint race was organised on a closed circuit loop on public roads in the town of Zingem.

== Encouraging road repair or construction ==
In the years leading up to the 1913 World Exhibition in Ghent, the RACF encouraged local and national politicians to improve the roads leading to the fair grounds out of fear the neglected roads would leave a bad impression on the visitors.

After World War I, the Club pushed for road repairs to and from the battlefields in the region of Ypres, to get the local economy back on track.

== Recent years ==
In the beginning of the 2000s, the activities of the RACF decreased temporarily. Since 2015, the club is hosting more activities again. Current activities still follow the original goals of the club. These include touristic tours, car-related presentations, car show visits and visits to the car industry. The focus is on all kind of car enthusiasts that are interested in oldtimers, youngtimers and more recent cars.

The Club celebrated their 125th anniversary on June 8, 2024, with a tour ending in the historic centre of Ghent.

== Gallery ==
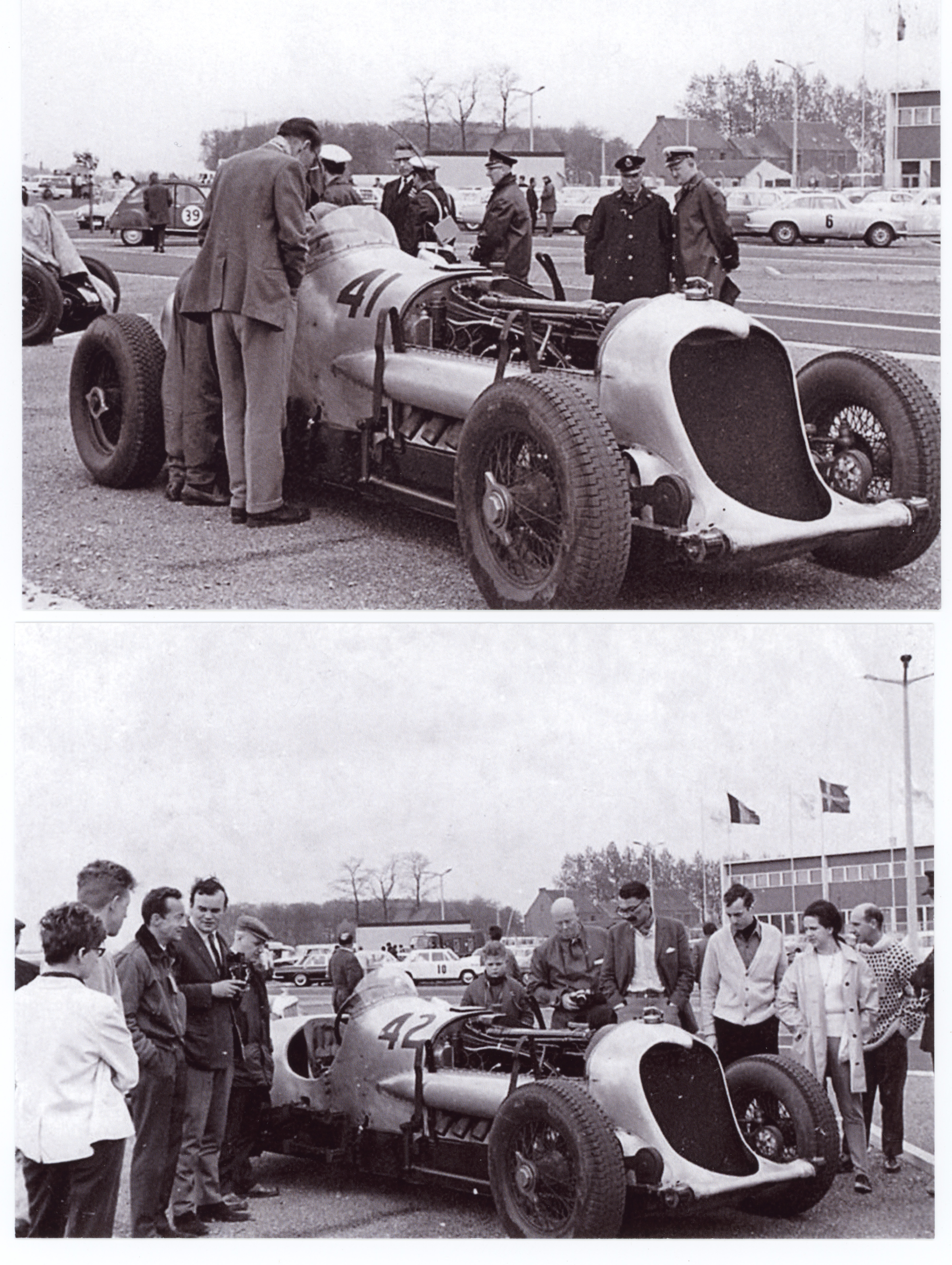
Royal Automobile Club of Flanders Standing and Rolling Kilometer 1975 Napier

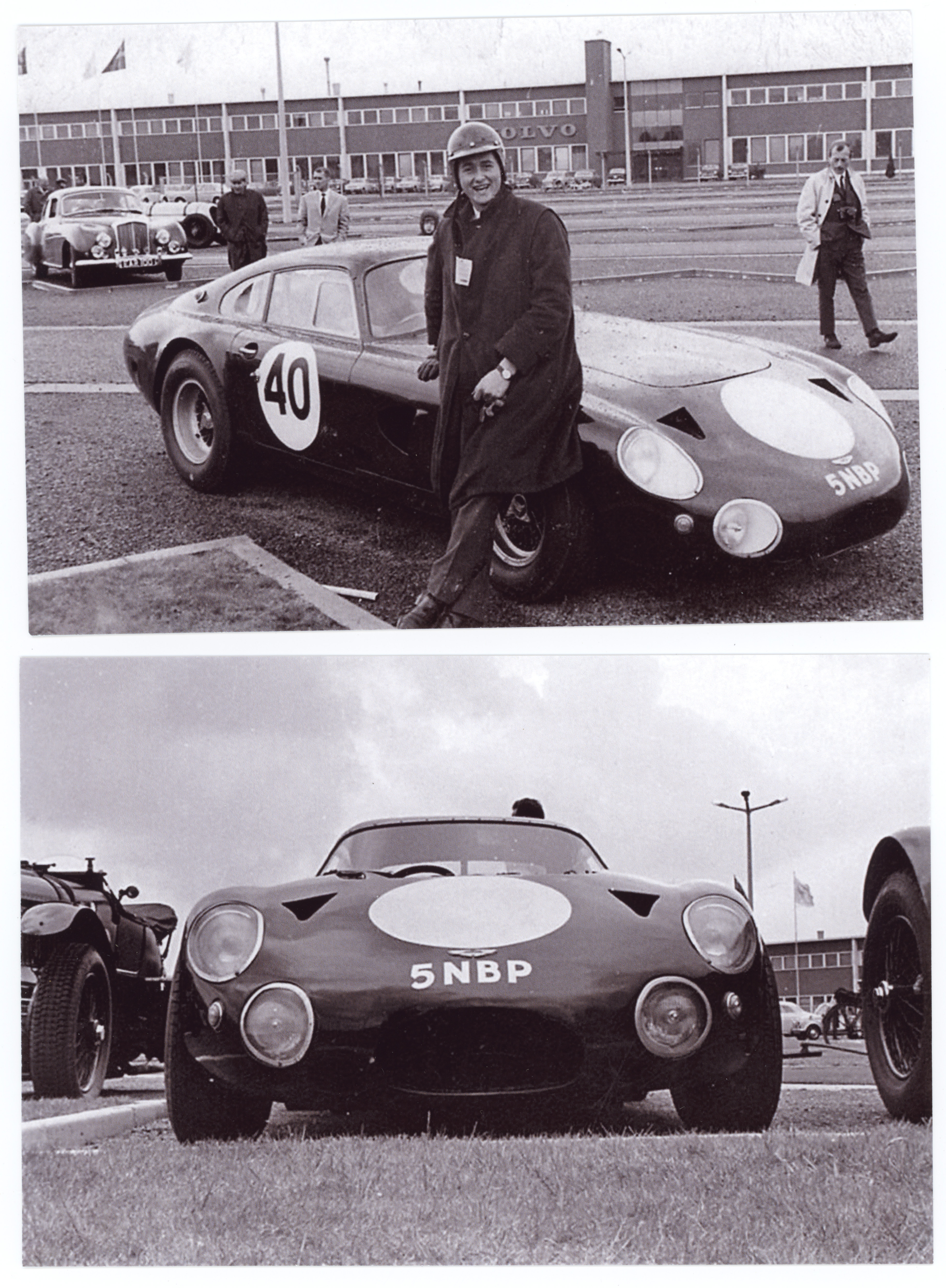
Aston Martin DB 214 in 1975 at the Royal Automobile Club of Flanders Standing and Rolling Kilometer

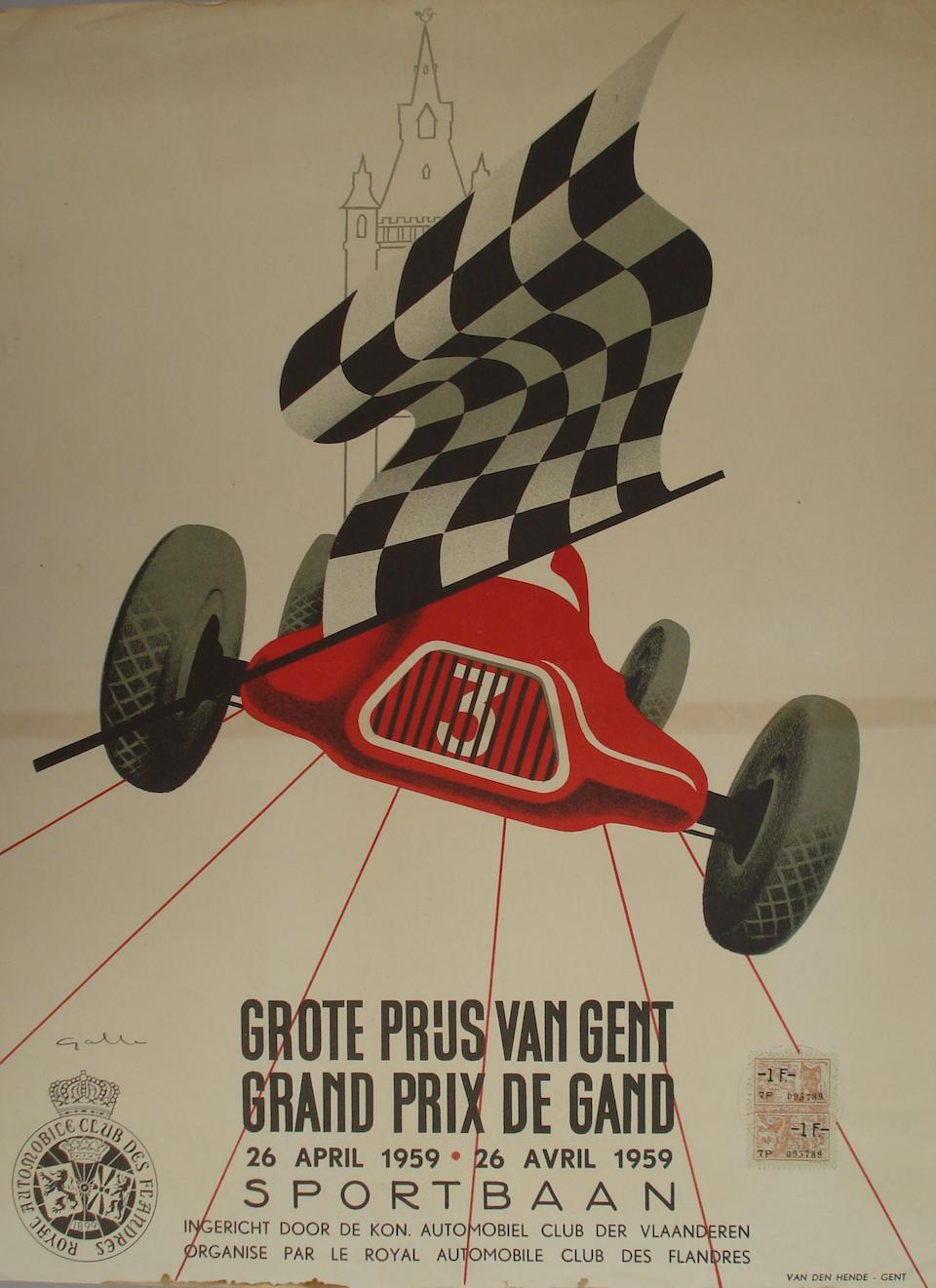
Grand Prix of Ghent 1959
