= Kammback =

Automotive styling feature

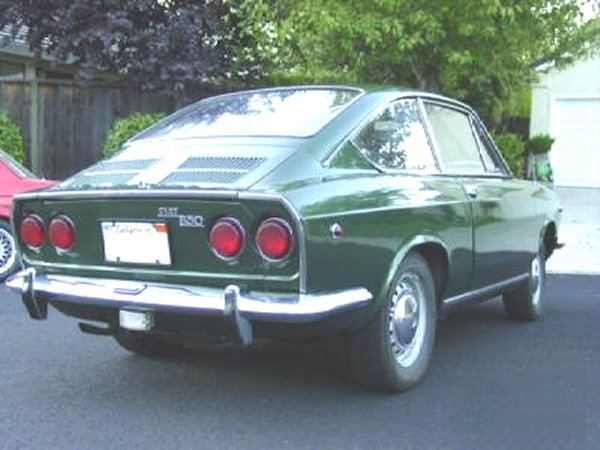
Kammback on a 1969 Fiat 850 Coupe

A Kammback, also known as a Kamm tail or K-tail, is an automotive styling feature wherein the rear of the car slopes downwards before being abruptly cut off with a vertical or near-vertical surface. A Kammback reduces aerodynamic drag, thus improving efficiency and reducing fuel consumption, while maintaining a practical shape for a vehicle.

The Kammback is named after German aerodynamicist Wunibald Kamm for his work developing the design in the 1930s.

Some vehicles incorporate the kammback design based on aerodynamic principles, while some use a cut-off tail as a design or marketing feature.

== Origins ==
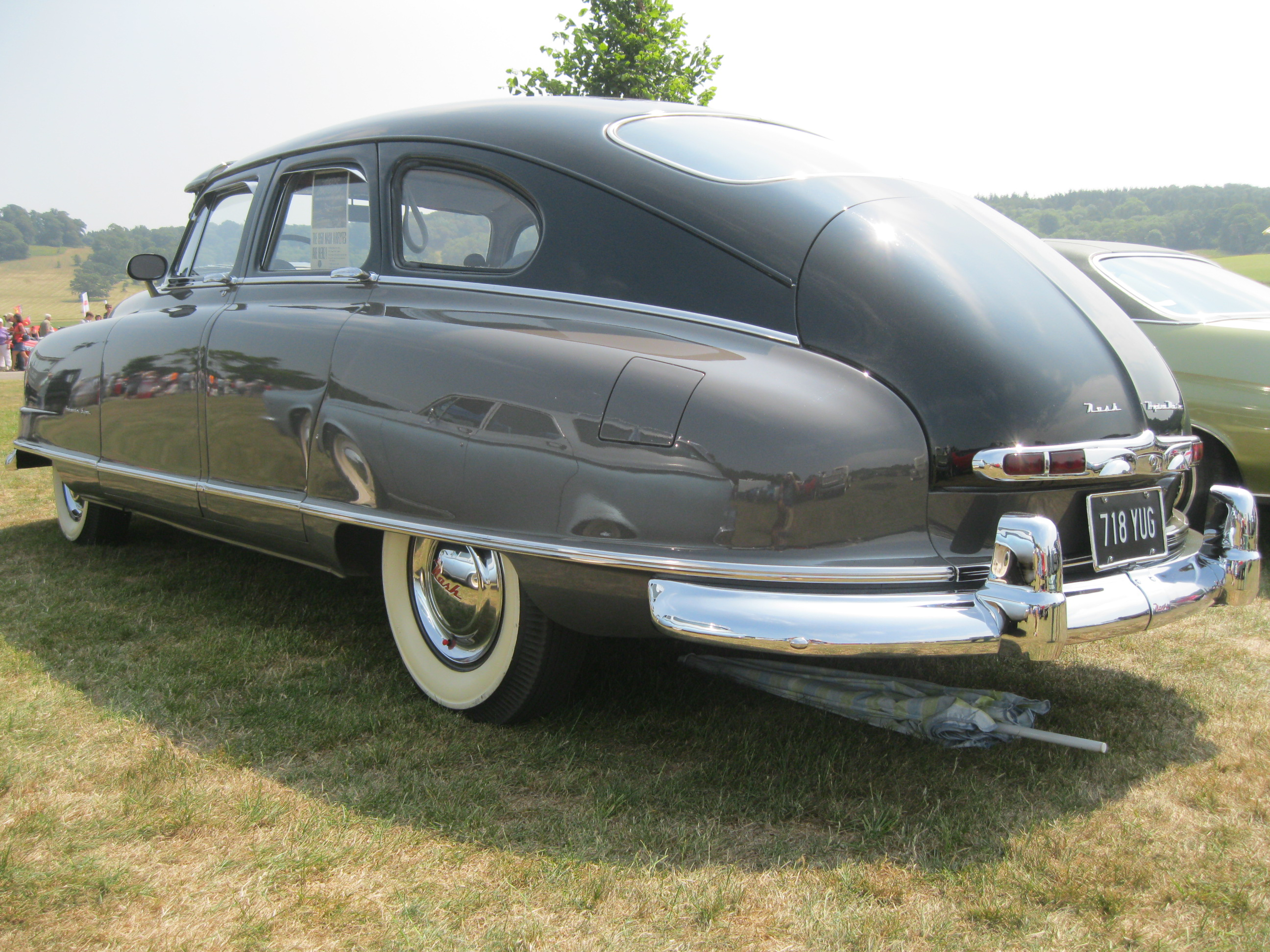
1950 Nash Airflyte

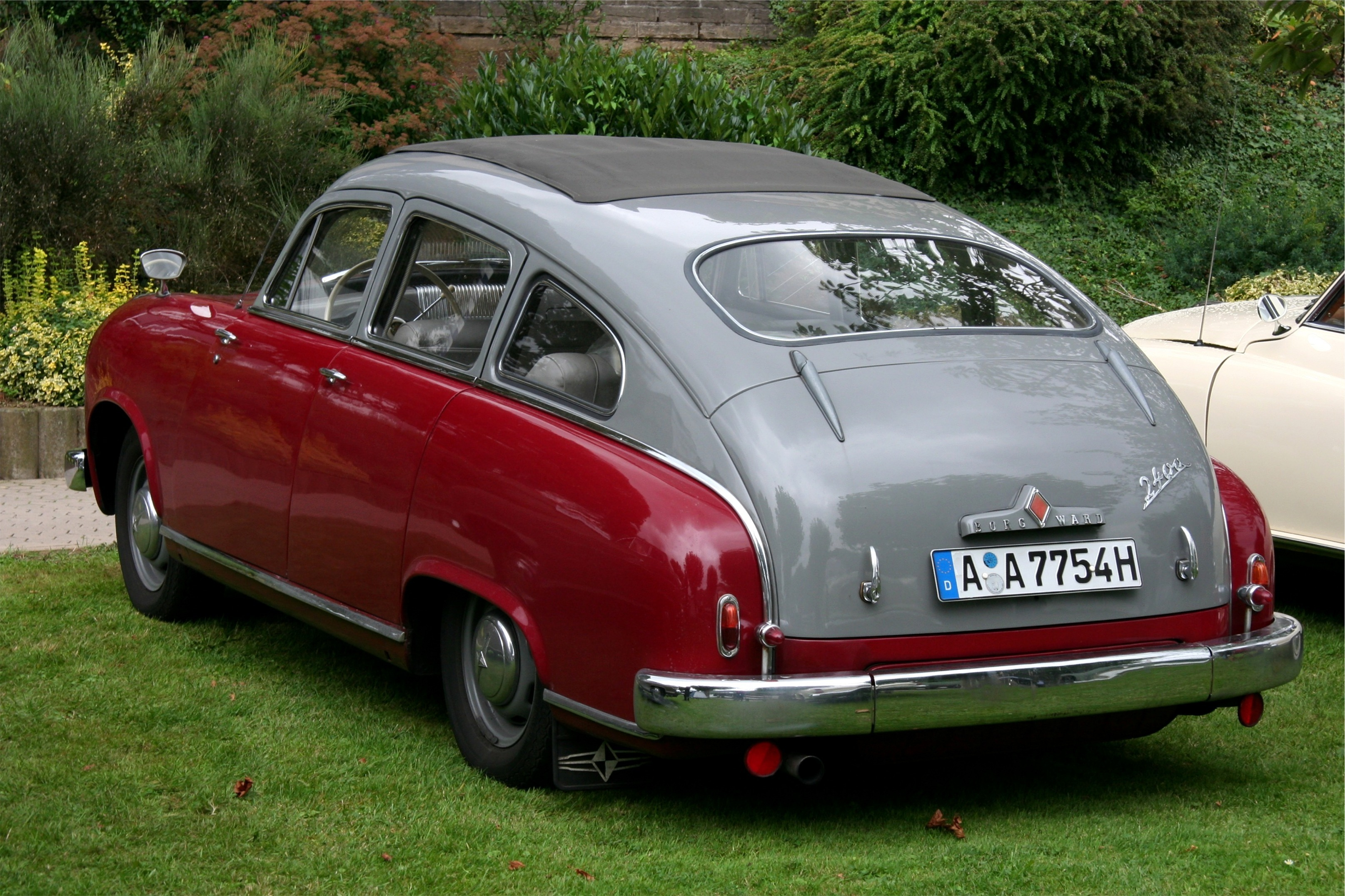
1952 Borgward Hansa 2400

As the speed of cars increased during the 1920s and 1930s, designers observed and began to apply the principles of automotive aerodynamics. As aerodynamic drag increases, more energy, and thus more fuel, is required to propel the vehicle.

In 1922, Paul Jaray patented a car based on a teardrop profile (i.e. with a rounded nose and long, tapered tail) to minimize the aerodynamic drag that is created at higher speeds. The streamliner vehicles of the mid 1930s—such as the Tatra 77, Chrysler Airflow and Lincoln-Zephyr—were designed according to these discoveries.

However, the long tail was not a practical shape for a car, so automotive designers sought other solutions. In 1935, German aircraft designer Georg Hans Madelung showed alternatives to minimize drag without a long tail. In 1936, a similar theory was applied to cars after Baron Reinhard Koenig-Fachsenfeld developed a smooth roofline shape with an abrupt end at a vertical surface, effective in achieving low amounts of drag similar to a streamlined body. He worked on an aerodynamic design for a bus, and Koenig-Fachsenfeld patented the idea. Koenig-Fachsenfeld worked with Wunibald Kamm at Stuttgart University, investigating vehicle shapes to "provide a good compromise between everyday utility (e.g. vehicle length and interior dimensions) and an attractive drag coefficient". In addition to aerodynamic efficiency, Kamm emphasized vehicle stability in his design, mathematically and empirically proving the effectiveness of the design.

In 1938, Kamm produced a prototype using a Kammback shape, based on a BMW 328. The Kammback, along with other aerodynamic modifications, gave the prototype a drag coefficient of 0.25.

The earliest mass-produced cars using Kammback principles were the 1949–1951 Nash Airflyte in the United States and the 1952–1955 Borgward Hansa 2400 in Europe.

== Aerodynamic theory ==
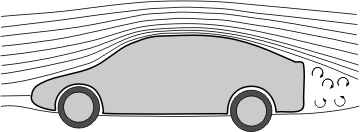
Streamlines around a car with Kammback

The ideal shape to minimize drag is a "teardrop," a smooth airfoil-like shape, but it is not practical for road vehicles because of size constraints. However, researchers, including Kamm, found that abruptly cutting off the tail resulted in a minimal increase in drag. The reason for this is that a turbulent wake region forms behind the vertical surface at the rear of the car. This wake region mimics the effect of the tapered tail in that air in the free stream does not enter this region (avoiding boundary layer separation); therefore, smooth airflow is maintained, minimizing drag.

Kamm's design is based on the tail being truncated at the point where the cross section area is 50% of the car's maximum cross-section, which Kamm found represented a good compromise, as by that point the turbulence typical of flat-back vehicles had been mostly eliminated at typical speeds.

The Kammback presented a partial solution to the problem of aerodynamic lift, which was becoming severe as sports car racing speeds increased during the 1950s. The design paradigm of sloping the tail to reduce drag was carried to an extreme on cars such as the Cunningham C-5R, resulting in an airfoil effect lifting the rear of the car at speed and so running the risk of instability or loss of control. The Kammback decreased the area of the lifting surface while creating a low-pressure zone underneath the tail.

Some studies showed that the addition of a rear spoiler to a Kammback design was not beneficial because the overall drag increased with the angles that were studied.

== Usage ==
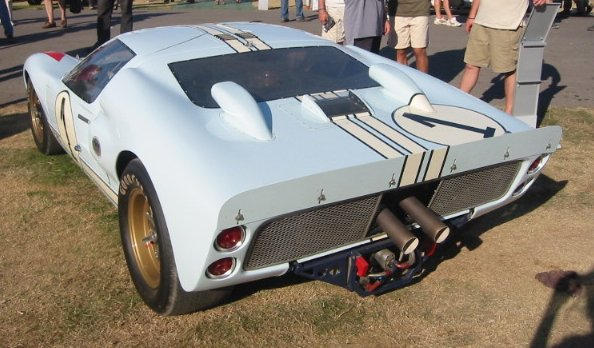
1964-1969 Ford GT40

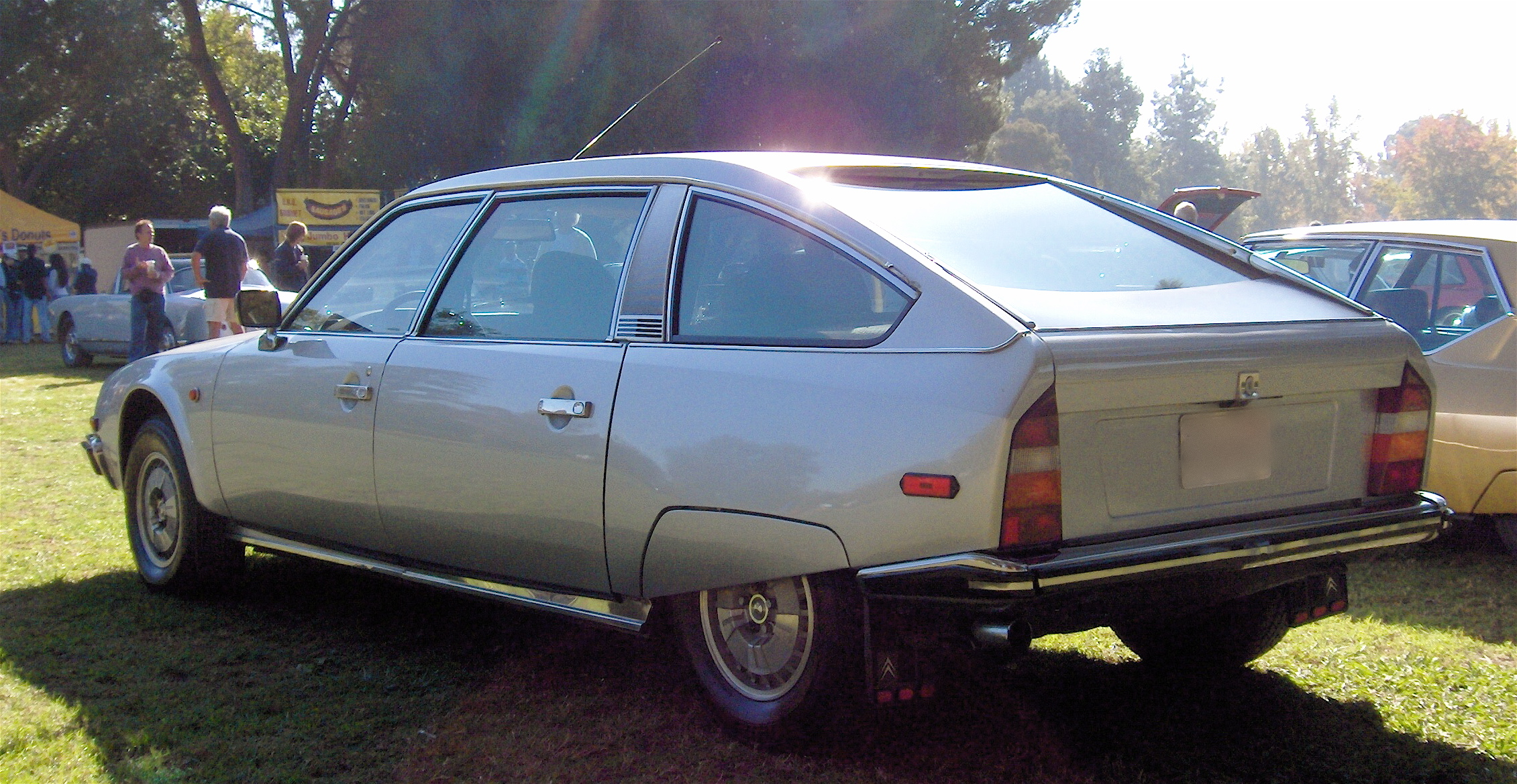
1974-1985 Citroën CX

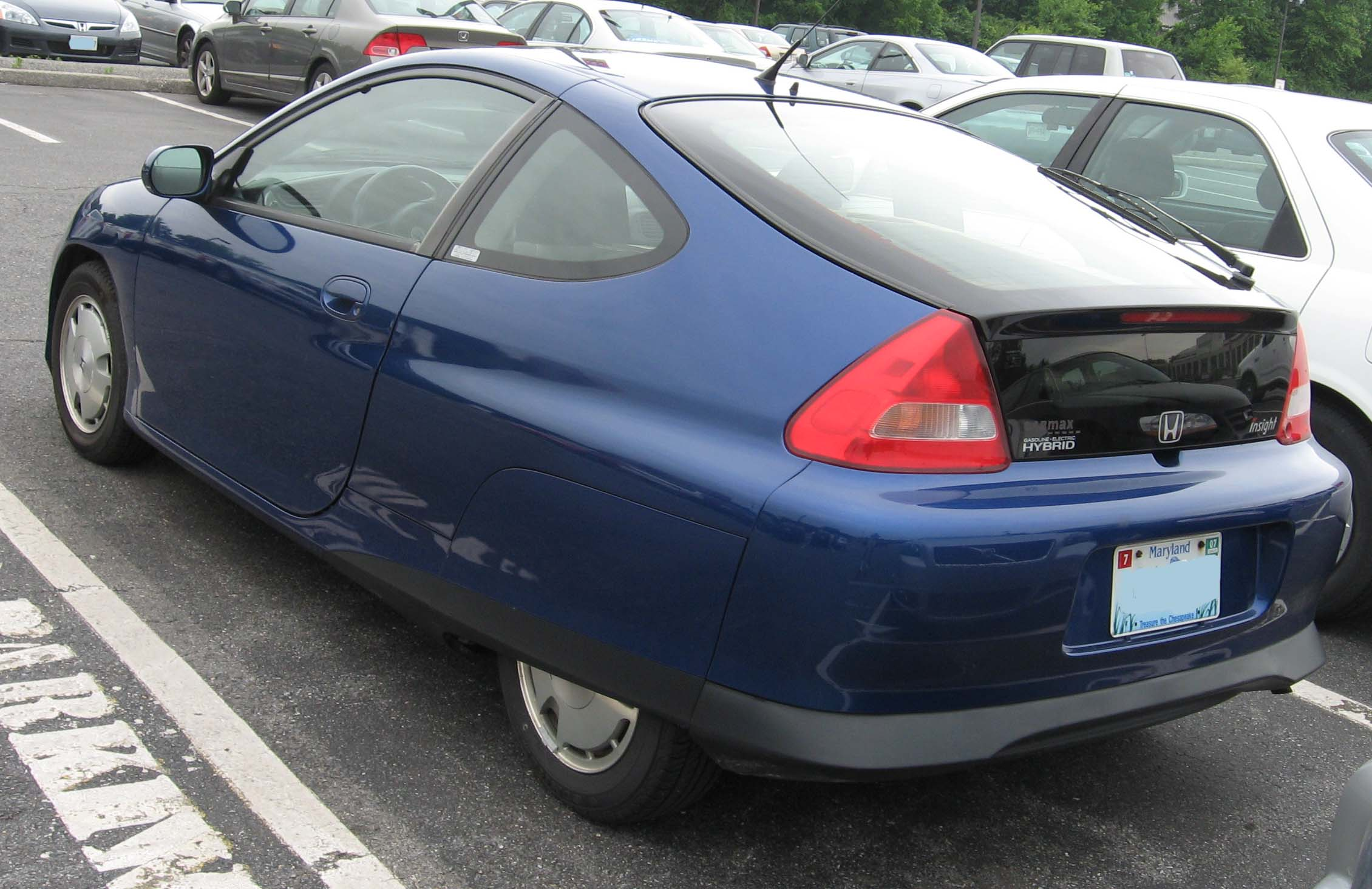
2000-2006 Honda Insight

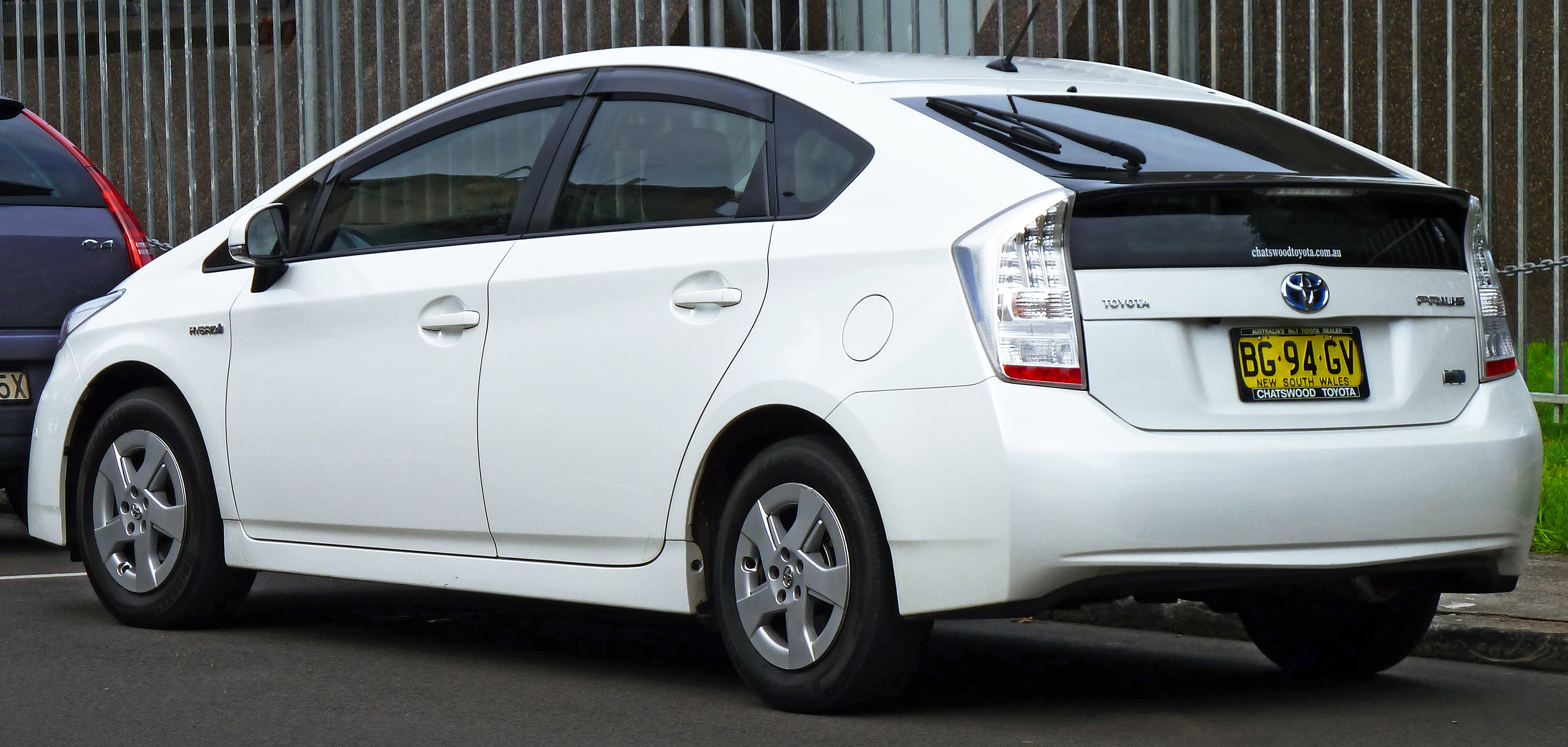
2009–2015 Toyota Prius

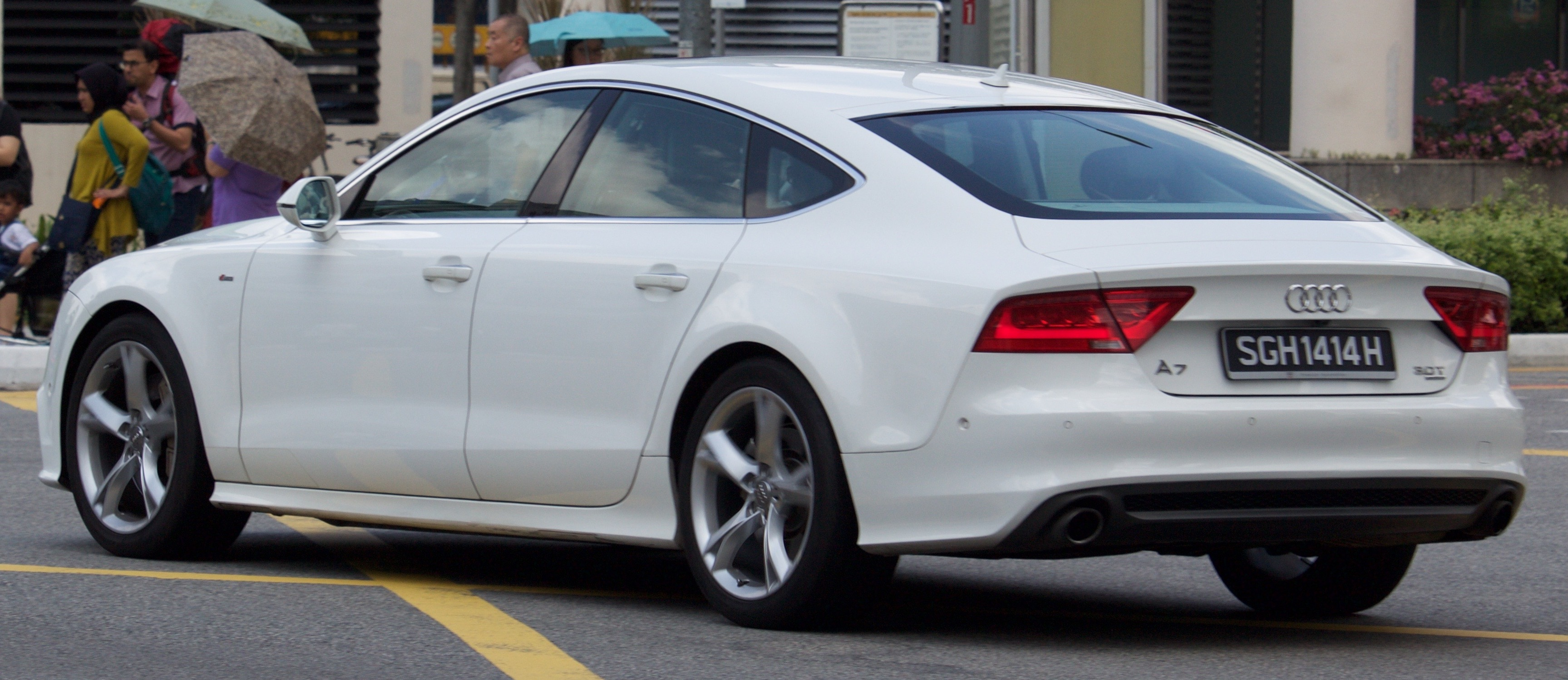
2011 Audi A7

In 1959, the Kammback came into use on full-body racing cars as an anti-lift measure, and within a few years would be used on virtually all such vehicles. The design had a resurgence in the early 2000s as a method to reduce fuel consumption in hybrid electric vehicles.

Several cars have been marketed as Kammbacks despite their profiles not adhering to the aerodynamic philosophy of a true Kammback. These models include the 1971–1977 Chevrolet Vega Kammback wagon, the 1981–1982 AMC Eagle Kammback, the AMC AMX-GT, and the Pontiac Firebird–based "Type K" concept cars.

Some models that are marketed as "coupes"—such as BMW and Mercedes-Benz SUVs like the X6 and GLC Coupé—"use a sort-of Kammback shape, though their tail ends have a few more lumps and bumps than a proper Kammback ought to have."

Cars that have had a Kammback include:

- 1940 BMW 328 "Mille Miglia" Kamm coupé
- 1952 Cunningham C-4RK
- 1958-1963 Lotus Elite
- 1961 Ferrari 250 GT SWB Breadvan
- 1962–1964 Ferrari 250 GTO
- 1963 Aston Martin DP215
- 1963-1964 Porsche 904 Carrera GTS
- 1963-1967 Alfa Romeo Giulia TZ
- 1963–1974 Bizzarrini Iso Grifo
- 1964-1965 Shelby Daytona
- 1964-1968 Ferrari 275 GTB
- 1965–1968 Ford GT40
- 1965–1970 Aston Martin DB6
- 1965–1996, 2005–present Mini Marcos
- 1966 Porsche 906
- 1966-1970 Unipower GT
- 1966-1974 Saab Sonett II and III
- 1967-1977 Alfa Romeo Tipo 33
- 1968–1973 Ferrari 365 GTB/4 ("Daytona")
- 1968–1976 Ferrari Dino
- 1968-1978 Lamborghini Espada
- 1969–1972 Fiat 850 Grand Prix ("Lombardi")
- 1970–1975 Citroën SM
- 1970–1977 Alfa Romeo Montreal
- 1970–1986 Citroën GS
- 1970–1978 Datsun 240Z, 260Z, 280Z
- 1971–1989 Alfa Romeo Alfasud
- 1971–1973 Ford Mustang Fastback
- 1972–1982 Maserati Khamsin
- 1972-1984 Alfa Romeo Alfetta
- 1974–1991 Citroën CX
- 1983-1991 Honda CR-X
- 1984-1998 Opel Kadett E (aka Vauxhall Astra 2nd generation)
- 1985-1995 Autobianchi Y10 / Lancia Y10
- 1986-2016 Daewoo LeMans
- 1991–1998 Mazda MX-3
- 1994–1998 Mazda Familia Neo/323C
- 1995–2004 Alfa Romeo GTV and Spider
- 1999-2005 Audi A2
- 2000–2006 Honda Insight
- 2002-2006 TVR T350
- 2004–present Toyota Prius
- 2010–2014 Honda Insight (2nd generation)
- 2010-2016 Honda CR-Z
- 2010–present Audi A7
- 2017–2022 Hyundai Ioniq
- 2018–2023 Kia Stinger
- 2020–present Tesla Model Y
- 2024–present Li Mega
- 2024–present Aston Martin Valour

== See also ==
- Fastback, a similar automotive styling feature
- Liftback, a type of tailgate that cars with a Kammback often use
