= Aston Martin DBR2 =

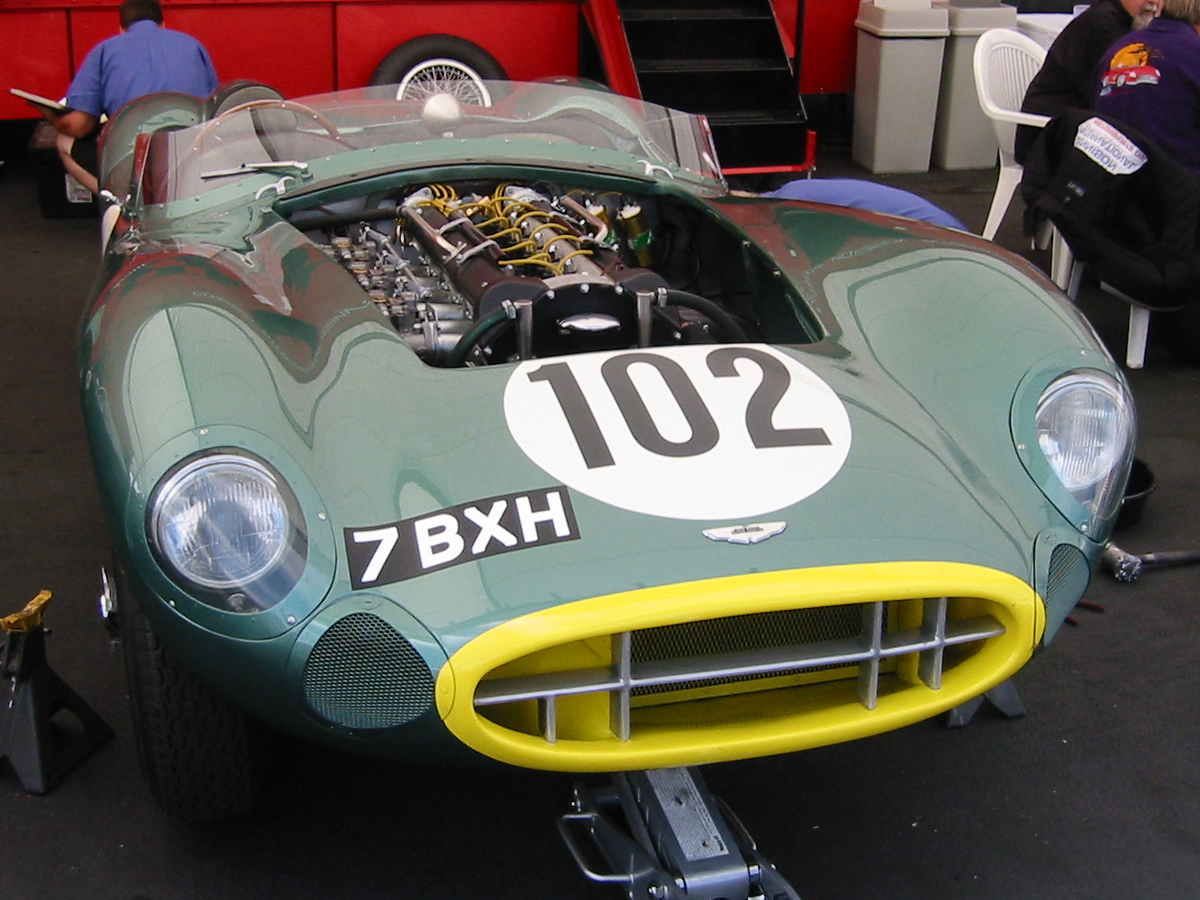
- Aston Martin DBR2/2 at Monterey Historics 2004
- Category: Le Mans Racer Sports car racing
- Constructor: Aston Martin Lagonda LTD
- Designer: Ted Cutting

Technical specifications
- Chassis: Multi-tubular, space frame design
- Suspension (front): Torsion bar and trailing arms
- Suspension (rear): De Dion with longitudinal Torsion bars and sliding block differential
- Length: 13 ft 2.5 in (402.6 cm)
- Width: 5 ft 4 in (163 cm)
- Height: 3 ft 2.5 in (97.8 cm)
- Axle track: 4 ft 5 in (135 cm)
- Wheelbase: 7 ft 9 in (236 cm)
- Engine: Aston Martin 3,670 cc / 3,910 cc / 4,164 cc, Straight 6, FR Layout
- Transmission: David Brown 'S 532' 5-speed Manual
- Weight: approx 1,765 lb (801 kg)
- Tyres: Avon

Competition history
- Notable entrants: (United Kingdom) David Brown
- Notable drivers: (United Kingdom) Tony Brooks, (United Kingdom) Roy Salvadori, (United Kingdom) Noël Cunningham-Reid, (United States) Carroll Shelby, (United Kingdom) Stirling Moss, (Belgium) Paul Frere
- Debut: 1957 24 Hours of Le Mans

The Aston Martin DBR2 was a sports racing car built in 1957 as a sibling to the Aston Martin DBR1, yet competing in a larger engine capacity group.

== Development ==
The DBR2 was created from a short lived Lagonda project known as DP166 (DP for Development Project), This was a multi tube, back bone space frame chassis designed by Willy Watson. This was a progression from the DP115 'wide tubed ladder type' chassis which was similar to that used in the DB3S. Both the DP115 and the DP166 chassis were originally fitted with the failed Lagonda 4.5L V12 engine. All Three of the DP166 chassis made were leaning up against the wall of the Feltham racing department awaiting their fate, that was until the chief race car designer for Aston Martin at that time Ted Cutting was asked by John Wyer to build two race cars from two of the three chassis. The engines to be used were the new Tadek Marek designed 6 cylinder, 3.7 litre unit. He had just completed this engine for the forthcoming DB4. Ted Cutting was allocated four of the six prototype DB4 engines made, these to be used in the DBR2 cars. This was much to the dismay of Tadek Marek. When Ted Cutting got his hands on the newly designed DB4 engines, he made some fundamental changes to the oil delivery system before the unit was fitted into the production DB4s. In 1958 a 3000 cc engine capacity limit was placed on prototype cars competing in the World Sportscar Championship, so the DBR2s at 3.700 cc could no longer compete at championship events. Sir David Brown then had the idea to send both the DBR2s to the USA and to use them as a promotional tool for his new DB4. Both DBR2s were sent to the USA with Rex Woodgate and used to good effect.

The all aluminium bodies for the DBR2 were also designed by Ted Cutting. This was a similar design to the one he later used on his Le Man winning Aston Martin DBR1. The DBR2 was slightly larger and more aerodynamic. These cars would be christened DBR2/1 and DBR2/2.

== Racing history ==
DBR2/1 initially began competition at the 1957 24 Hours of Le Mans, where it retired due to a poorly performing carburation system, which in effect was a single carburetor for each cylinder; this problem was resolved for the cars next outing when these were replaced with three twin side draft Weber DCO 50s. DBR2/1 only notable success for 1957 was at the Daily Express Trophy at Silverstone Circuit in the hands of Roy Salvadori. DBR2/1 was entered for the August 1957 Spa Grand Prix. During practice the car was performing well in the hands of Noel Cunningham-Reid; however, on his last practice lap, Noel saw what he thought to be one of his team mates up-side-down in a ditch, he was unable to stop and help due to other race car traffic, however, with this on his mind he entered the next bend too fast, he came off the track, went down an embankment when the car turned over, Noel was thrown clear landing in a pile of pine cones, looking up just at that moment to see his car smash into a tree. After an inspection of the recovered car by John Wyer, he deemed the car to badly damaged to continue. Upon return to Feltham, it was found that the chassis was quite badly damaged in critical areas. With this car being booked in to race at Silverstone about three weeks later, it was decided to remove everything of use from the damaged chassis and transpose it to the spare chassis. The damaged chassis was to be disposed of, but ended up in the possession of John Willment.

For 1958 the DBR2s were upgraded to 3.9 Litre engines. DBR2/1 won both the Sussex Trophy at Goodwood and the British Empire Trophy at Oulton Park, driven by Stirling Moss in both wins. After finishing 2nd and 3rd at Spa, Aston Martin decided to concentrate on the DBR1 for Europe, while both DBR2s were upgraded to the 4.2 Litre engines and transferred to America where they could compete easier with larger engine capacities. George Constantine drove DBR2/1 to victories at Lime Rock and Marlborough before the end of the season.

Continuing in the United States in 1959, the cars again took victory in New York and twice in the Bahamas, driven by George Constantine and Stirling Moss. Both cars were then returned to Aston Martin in 1960.

== Later life ==
DBR2/1 was sold to private hands following its return to Britain, changing hands twice before being stripped of its body and having the coupe bodywork from DB3/6 placed on top of it. DBR2/2 was also sold to private owners, being sold various times over the years. Its most recent sale DBR2/1 fetched a price of £9,200,000. A restored DBR2 recently won the Pebble Beach Concours d'Elegance's People's Choice Award.

== Chassis information ==
Included are a list of notable results for each chassis.

- Aston Martin DBR2/1 - Completed 1957
  - 1957 Le Mans 24 Hour- ret
  - 1957 B.R.D.C. Silverstone- 3rd
  - 1958 B.R.D.C Silverstone- 5th
  - 1958 Spa GP- 3rd
- Aston Martin DBR2/2 - Completed 1957
  - 1957 B.R.D.C. Silverstone- 1st
  - 1958 B.A.R.C. Aintree- 2nd
  - 1958 B.R.D.C. Silverstone- 4th
  - 1958 Spa GP- 2nd
