= Mike Salmon (racing driver) =

British racing driver (1933–2016)

- Nationality: British
- Born: Michael Salmon; October 12, 1933
- Died: January 13, 2016 (aged 82)

24 Hours of Le Mans career
- Years: 1962–1984
- Teams: Aston Martin, Ferrari
- Best finish: 5th (1963)
- Class wins: 0

Michael Thomas Salmon (12 October 1933 – 13 January 2016) was a British racing driver from England, who competed in the 24 Hours of Le Mans between 1962 and 1984. He was also active in the British Saloon Car Championship and the World and European Endurance championships.

== Early life ==
Salmon was from the Channel Islands and was evacuated to Britain in 1940 as the islands came under threat from enemy forces in World War II. He served an apprenticeship with Jaguar Cars and subsequently joined their service department, working at various dealerships around the UK to gain experience.

== Racing career ==
=== Early career 1955–61 ===
Salmon began his career in sports car racing with a Jaguar XK120 in 1955 and 1956, before moving to a C-type in 1957 and 1958. In the four-year period, Salmon only finished out of the top-six in three, out of 16, national-level races. In 1959, 1960 and 1961, he raced an ex-Ecurie Ecosse D-type Jaguar winning the Autosport three-hour race at Snetterton and the Martini trophy at Silverstone, both in 1961.

=== Le Mans 1962–68 ===
In 1962, Salmon competed with his own Aston Martin DB4GT, mainly in domestic competitions. He achieved several placed finishes and also entered the Le Mans 24 hour race for the first time. Co-driven by Ian Baillie, the car retired after 124 laps, with engine failure.

In 1963, Salmon began the year with the Aston Martin DB4GT, but competed in the Nürburgring 1000 km race in a Ferrari 250 GT alongside entrant Chris Kerrison, finishing eighth. The year also yielded his best result at Le Mans, finishing fifth overall in a Ferrari 330 LMB entered by UK Ferrari importer Maranello Concessionaires and co-driven by Jack Sears. He also won the Brands Hatch six-hour race in July, a round of the European Touring Car Championship, co-driven by Peter Sutcliffe in a Jaguar Mk II. However, the car was subsequently disqualified as the engine did not meet the regulations. He also competed on behalf of John Coombs, in a Jaguar E-type and Ferrari 250 GTO, finishing eighth in the Silverstone 1963 British Grand Prix support race and fifth in the Guards Trophy at Brands Hatch respectively.

In 1964, Salmon began a long association with Dawnay Racing, run by John Dawnay, later the 11th Viscount Downe. Their first entry was in the Daytona 2000 km race with an Aston Martin DP214. Co-driven by Roy Salvadori, the car failed to finish, retiring after 34 laps with an engine problem. Salmon competed in domestic sportscar and GT racing throughout the season with Dawnay Racing but entered Le Mans under his own name in a DP214, co-driven by Sutcliffe. The car completed 235 laps, but was disqualified due to an infringement of the rules in respect of taking on oil, having been running third in class at one point. Domestically, Salmon's best result was second place at the Silverstone International (GT).

In 1965, Salmon competed at Le Mans in a Ferrari 250LM, entered by Maranello Concessionaires. Co-driven by Lucien Bianchi, the car retired after 99 laps. A Ferrari 250LM was also entered by Maranello Concessionaires in the Monza 1,000 km race. Co-driven by Innes Ireland, the car finished sixth. In domestic competition, Salmon competed regularly for Dawnay Racing in a Ferrari 250 GTO, with the best result of fourth in the Sussex Trophy at Goodwood. He also won a round of the British Touring Car Championship at Snetterton in a Ford Mustang.

In 1966, Salmon began the year with a fourth place at the Brands Hatch 500 mile race alongside David Hobbs in a Ferrari 250 LM entered by David Piper. This was followed by a non-finish at the Spa 1000 km race in a Ferrari 365 P2, entered and co-driven by Piper and also in the Nürburgring 1,000 km in a Ford GT40 entered by Ronnie Hoare and co-driven by Ireland. At Le Mans, he was partnered by Hobbs in a Ferrari Dino 206 S entered by Maranello Concessionaires. However, the car retired after 14 laps. Domestically, his best result was second with a GT40 at the Eagle Trophy at Brands Hatch in August.

In 1967, Salmon competed at Le Mans in a GT40 entered by J. W. Automotive alongside Brian Redman but the car retired after 20 laps. The car suffered fire damage after re-fuelling when the cap was not correctly replaced. Salmon had burns to his arms and face and did not compete again that season, the burns also leaving permanent scarring. Domestically he competed in a GT40 entered by either Dawnay Racing or Viscount Downe, with a best result of second in the Martini Trophy at Silverstone.

Salmon returned to Le Mans in 1968 also with a GT40 co-driven by Eric Liddell and entered by Strathaven Ltd. The car failed to finish, completing 131 laps before retiring. Domestically, he raced the Strathaven GT40, mainly in endurance races and partnered by David Piper. However, a best finish of 11th at the Brands Hatch Six Hour race and a series of failures to finish meant that Salmon subsequently announced his retirement.

=== Return to racing 1970s–2008 ===
Salmon came out of retirement in the mid-1970s, to take part in historic racing, sometimes with the Aston Martin DP214 he had used at Le Mans in 1964. In 1977, he returned to Le Mans with a Robin Hamilton-entered Aston Martin DBS RHAM/1 V8 finishing 17th overall and third in class, co-driven by Hamilton and David Preece. In 1979, the same combination retired after 17 laps.

In 1981, Salmon drove Simon Phillips' Ferrari 512BB, competing in the Silverstone six-hour race and the six-hour relay but failed to finish on each occasion. At Le Mans, co-driven by Phillips and American driver Steve Earle, the car also failed to finish, retiring after 140 laps.

In 1982, Salmon resumed his association with Viscount Downe to drive his Nimrod NRA/C2, finishing sixth at the Silverstone six-hour race, ninth at the Brands Hatch 1000 km race and 11th at the Spa 1000 km race, each time with British co-driver, Ray Mallock. At Le Mans, joined by Simon Phillips, the Nimrod finished seventh overall and fourth in class despite late race brake problems and a misfire.

In 1983, Salmon again paired with Mallock and was joined by Earle for Le Mans. The car finished seventh at the Silverstone 1000 km and fourth at the Brands Hatch Thundersports race. However it failed to finish at both the Spa and Brands 1000 km events. At Le Mans it qualified 16th, and fastest of the naturally-aspirated cars. Although hampered by electrical problems, it completed 218 laps before retiring from 13th position when a connecting-rod broke.

1984 was Salmon's final entry at Le mans, teamed with Richard Attwood and John Sheldon the Nimrod again did not finish, completing 92 laps. The car crashed at the end of the Mulsanne Straight with Sheldon at the wheel. A marshall died in the incident but the driver was able to extricate himself with burns to his hands and side.

Salmon continued to compete in historic racing and in 2008, at 74 years of age, participated in the Silverstone Britcar 24-Hour race, in a BMW 330d but failed to finish. He was only forced to cease competing when a minor medical issue denied him a racing licence. He refused, on principle, to compete at Le Mans, after the chicanes were installed on the Mulsanne Straight.

== Personal life ==
Salmon worked in the motor trade throughout his career and became sales director at Maranello Concessionaires. He subsequently moved back to Jersey, where he opened a dealership specialising in Ferraris and Alfa Romeos. He was married to Jean (formerly Bloxam), who survived him and who also competed at club-racing level before their marriage. Salmon died on 13 January 2016, having been in poor health for some time.

== 24 Hours of Le Mans results ==
Year	Entrant	Co-Drivers	Car	Class	Laps	Pos.	Class Pos.
1962	(United Kingdom) Mike Salmon	(United Kingdom) Ian Baillie	Aston Martin DB4GT	GT +3.0	124	DNF	DNF
1963	(United Kingdom) Maranello Concessionaires	(United Kingdom) Jack Sears	Ferrari 330 LMB	P +3.0	314	5th	3rd
1964	(United Kingdom) Mike Salmon	(United Kingdom) Peter Sutcliffe	Aston martin DP214	GT +3.0	235	DSQ	DSQ
1965	(United Kingdom) Maranello Concessionaires	(Belgium) Lucien Bianchi	Ferrari 250LM	P 5.0	99	DNF	DNF
1966	(United Kingdom) Maranello Concessionaires	(United Kingdom) David Hobbs	Ferrari Dino 206 S	P 2.0	14	DNF	DNF
1967	(United Kingdom) J.W. Automotive	(United Kingdom) Brian Redman	Ford GT40 Mk I	S 5.0	20	DNF	DNF
1968	(United Kingdom) Strathaven	(United Kingdom) Eric Liddell	Ford GT40 Mk I	S 5.0	131	DNF	DNF
1977	(United Kingdom) Robin Hamilton	(United Kingdom) Robin Hamilton (United Kingdom) David Preece	Aston Martin DBS RHAM/1 V8	GTP	260	17th	3rd
1979	(United Kingdom) Robin Hamilton	(United Kingdom) Robin Hamilton (United Kingdom) David Preece	Aston Martin DBS RHAM/1 V8	GTP +3.0	21	DNF	DNF
1981	(United Kingdom) Simon Phillips	(United Kingdom) Simon Phillips (United States) Steve Earle	Ferrari 512BB LM	IMSA GTX	140	DNF	DNF
1982	(United Kingdom) Viscount Downe- Pace Petroleum	(United Kingdom) Ray Mallock (United Kingdom) Simon Phillips	Nimrod NRA/C2	C	317	7th	4th
1983	(United Kingdom) Viscount Downe- Pace Petroleum	(United Kingdom) Ray Mallock (United States) Steve Earle	Nimrod NRA/C2B	C	218	DNF	DNF
1984	(United Kingdom) Viscount Downe- Aston Martin	(United Kingdom) Richard Attwood (United Kingdom) John Sheldon	Nimrod NRA/C2B	C1	92	DNF	DNF
