= Tadek Marek =

Polish automotive engineer (1908–1982)

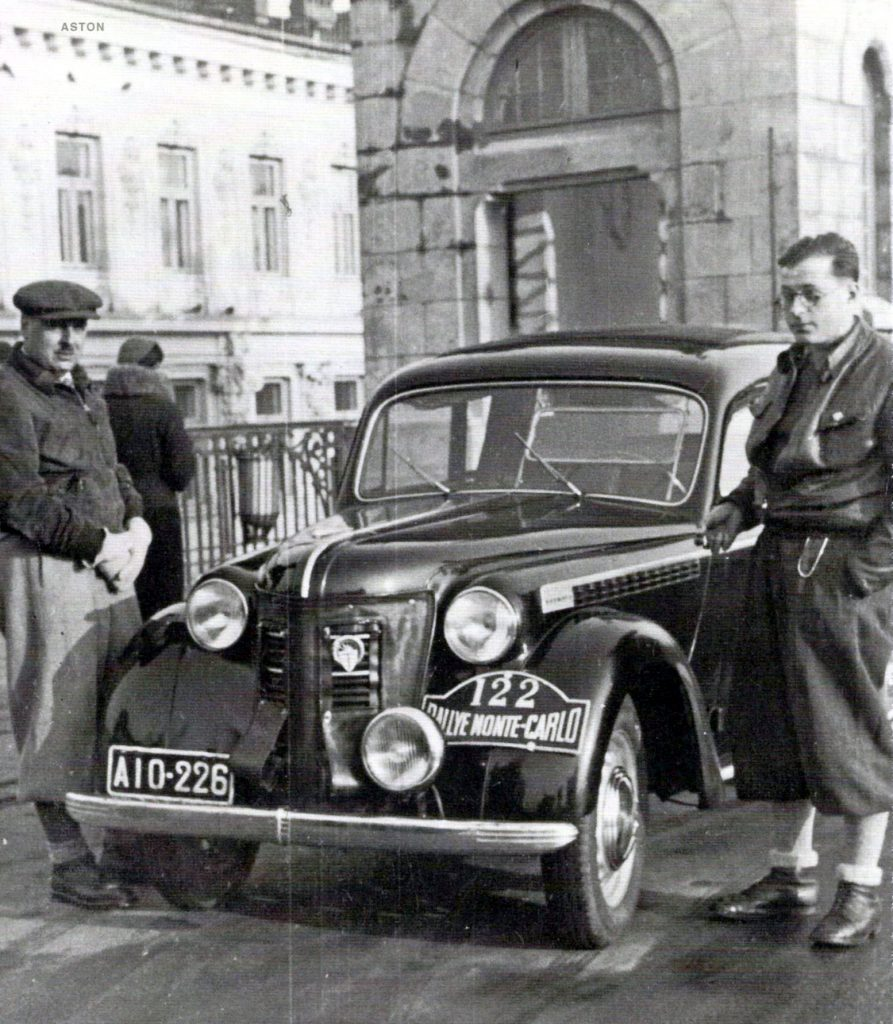
Marek at right with the Opel Olympia they drove at the 1939 Rallye Automobile Monte Carlo.

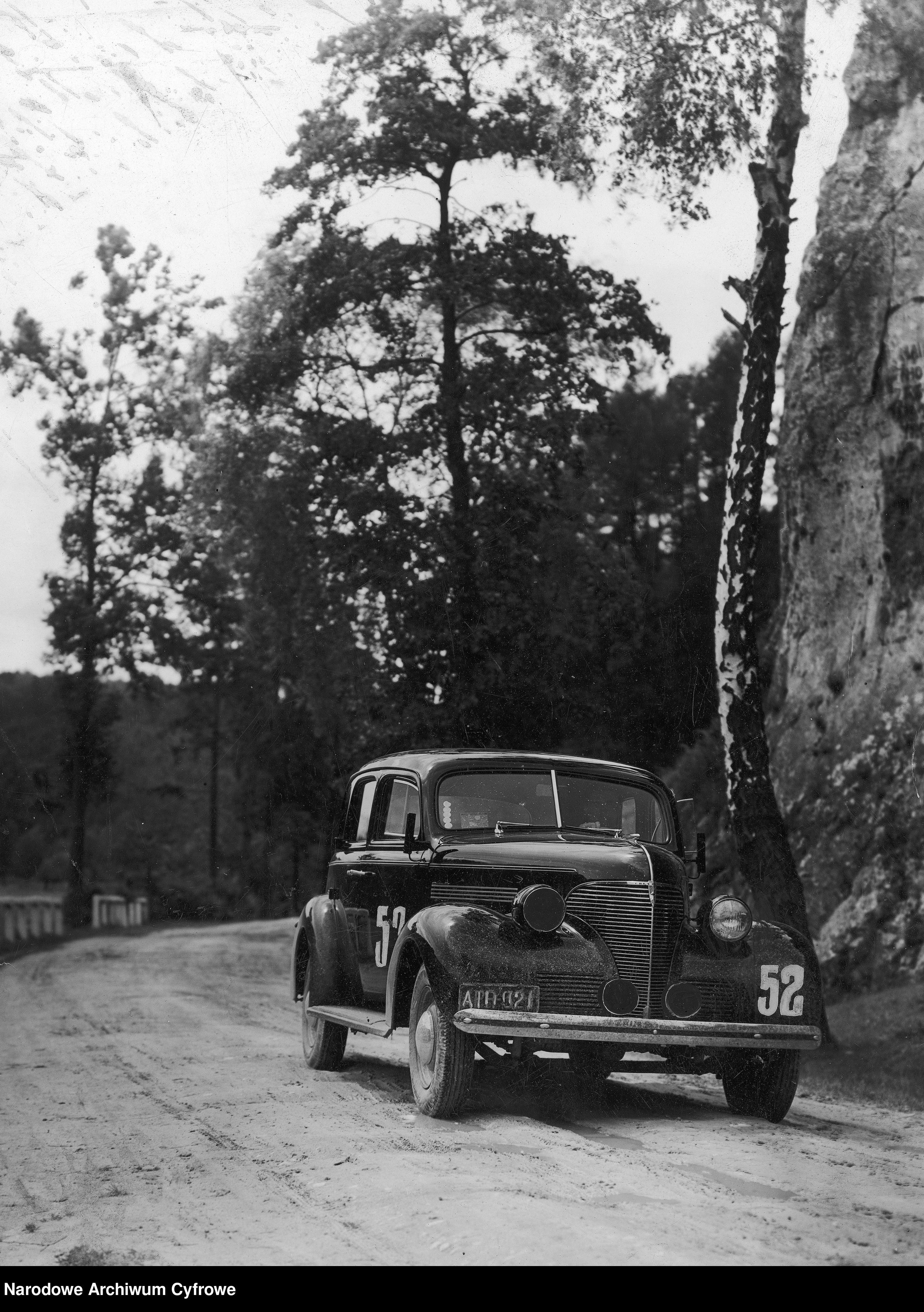
Tadek driving a Chevrolet Master to victory at 1939 Rally Poland.

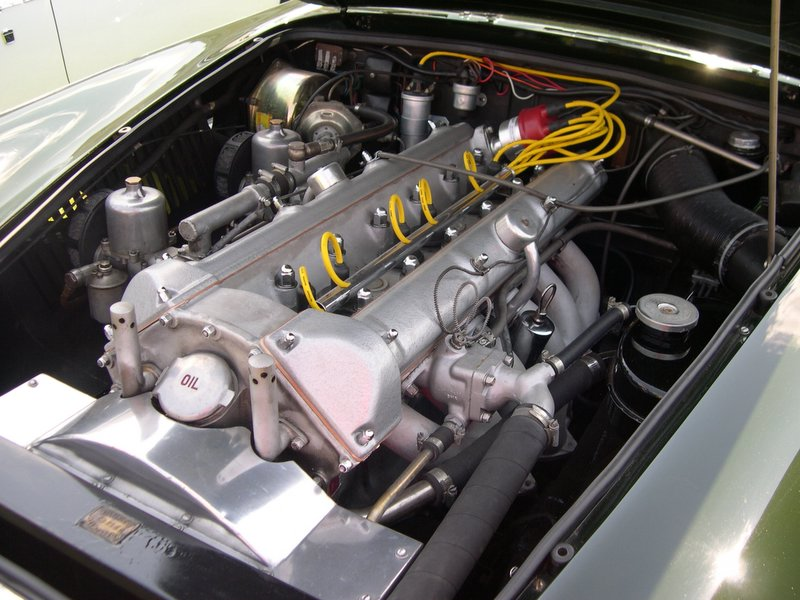
Tadek Marek designed the 3.7-litre 6-cylinder engine, here shown in an Aston Martin DB4.

Tadeusz "Tadek" Marek (1908–1982) was a Polish automobile engineer, known for his Aston Martin engines.

== Before the war ==
Marek was from Kraków and studied engineering at Technische Universität Berlin before working for Fiat in Poland and also for General Motors. Despite a serious racing accident in 1928, he raced the 1937 Monte Carlo Rally in a Fiat 1100 followed by a Lancia Aprilia in 1938 and an Opel Olympia in 1939. Driving a Chevrolet Master sedan, he won the XII Rally Poland (1939) before moving to Great Britain in 1940 to join the Polish Army.

He joined the Centurion tank Meteor engine development (1944), but returned to Germany, working for United Nations Relief and Rehabilitation Administration.

== After the war ==
In 1949 he joined the Austin Motor Company, and eventually joined Aston Martin (1954). He is notable for his work on three engines, developing the alloy straight six-cylinder engine of the Aston Martin DBR2 racing car (1956), redesigning the company's venerable straight six-cylinder Lagonda (1957), and developing the Aston Martin V8 engine (1968).

The Lagonda engine received a new cast iron block with top seating liners, used in the DB Mark III that debuted in 1957. After modifications, the DBR2 engine was used in the DB4 (1958), DB5 (1963), DB6 (1965) and DBS (1967). It was used for the final time in the 1973 Vantage. A rare cross over following the end of the David Brown era with only 71 produced with the Straight 6 but the body of the AMV8. The V8 first appeared in the DBS V8 in 1969, going on to power Aston Martins for part of five decades before being retired in 2000. A prototype was fitted in the mid-'60s in a one-off DB5 extended 4" after the doors and driven by Marek personally, and a normally 6-cylinder Aston Martin DB7 was equipped with a V8 unit in 1998.

Marek and his wife moved to Italy in 1968, where he died in 1982.
