= Aston Martin V8 Vantage =

Aston Martin V8 Vantage may refer to:

- Aston Martin V8 Vantage (1977)
- Aston Martin Virage (1993–2000)
- Aston Martin V8 Vantage (2005)
- Aston Martin V8 Vantage (2018)

== See also ==
- Aston Martin Vantage
- Aston Martin V8
