= Aston Martin V8 Vantage (1977) =

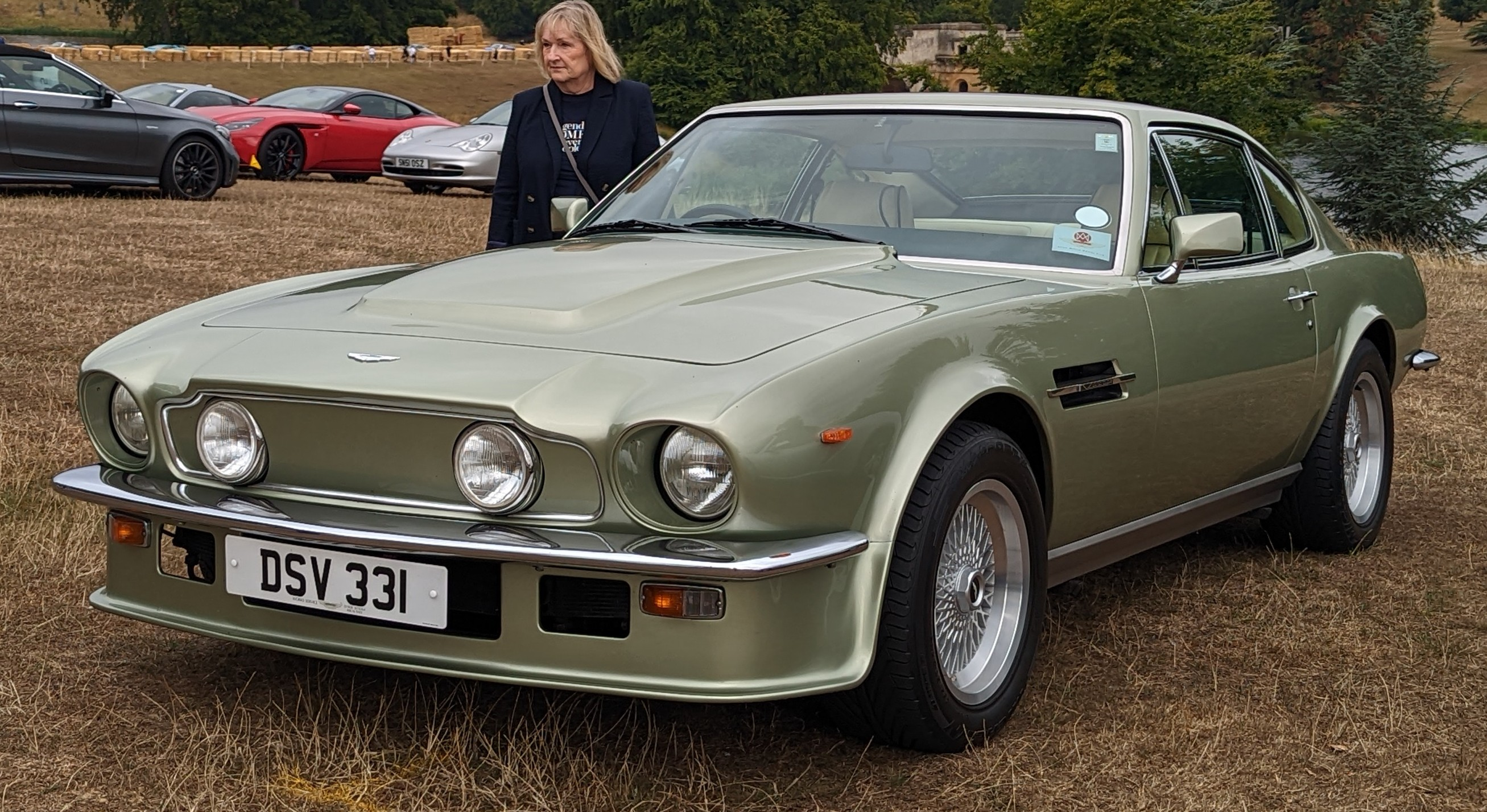
- 1985 Aston Martin V8 Vantage

Overview
- Manufacturer: Aston Martin
- Production: 1977–1989; 534 built; Saloon: 342 built; Volante: 192 built
- Assembly: United Kingdom: Newport Pagnell, Buckinghamshire, England
- Designer: William Towns

Body and chassis
- Class: Grand tourer
- Body style: 2-door coupé or convertible
- Layout: FR layout
- Related: Aston Martin V8; Aston Martin V8 Zagato

Powertrain
- Engine: 5.3 L or 6.3 L V8
- Power output: 380–450 bhp (385–456 PS; 283–336 kW)

Chronology
- Predecessor: DBS
- Successor: Virage/V8 Vantage

See also Aston Martin V8 Vantage (disambiguation) for other models sharing this name

The Aston Martin V8 Vantage is a British grand tourer, a higher performance version of the Aston Martin V8. It was hailed at its 1977 introduction as "Britain's First Supercar" for its 170 mph (270 km/h) top speed. Its engine was shared with the Lagonda, but it used high-performance camshafts, increased compression ratio, larger inlet valves and bigger carburettors mounted on new manifolds for increased output. Straight-line performance was the best of the day, with acceleration from 0–60 mph (97 km/h) in 5.3 seconds, one-tenth of a second quicker than the Ferrari Daytona.

== Design ==
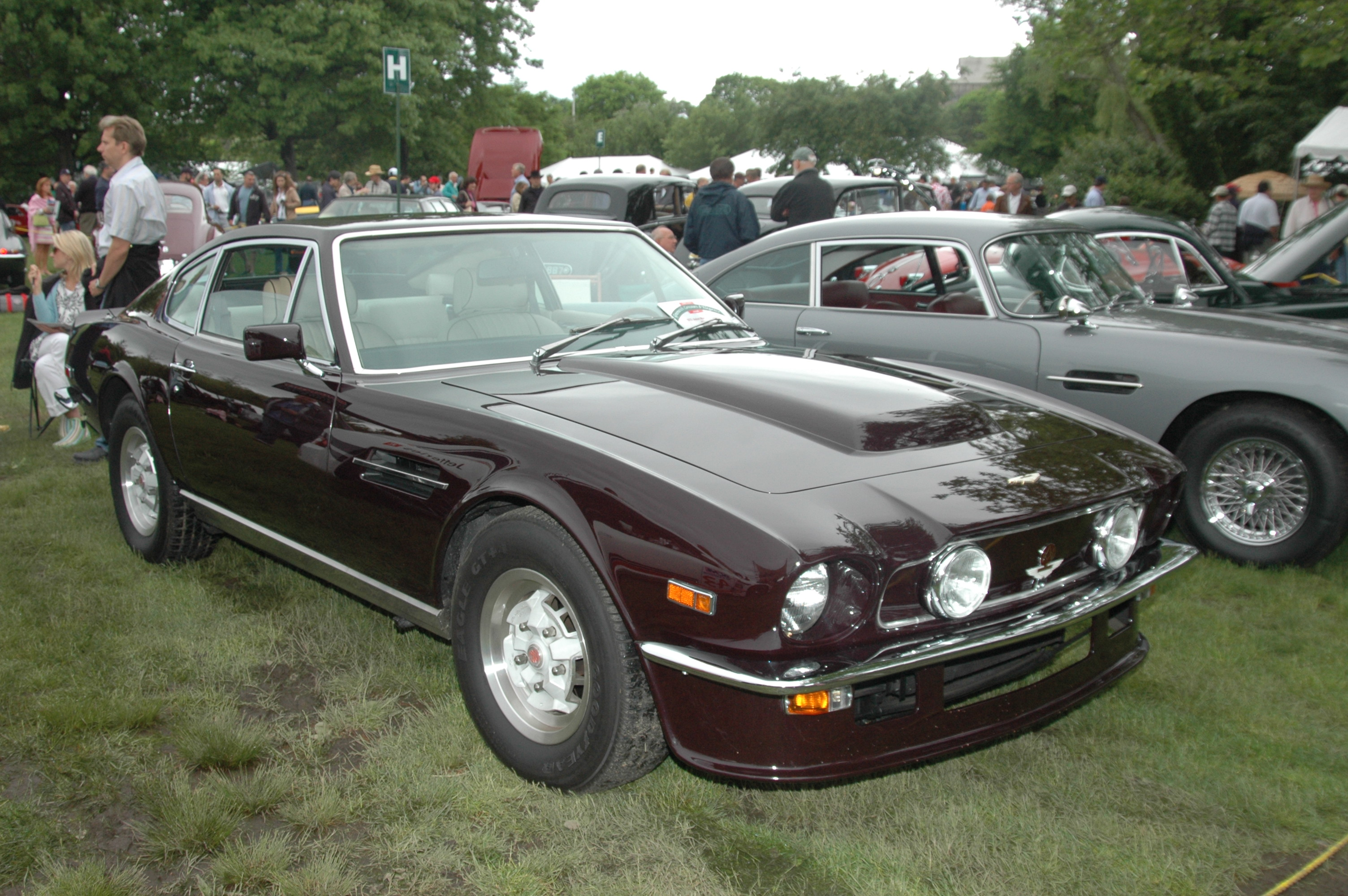
1976 model year Cosmetic Vantage at the Concours d'Elegance in Greenwich, Connecticut

The first series equipped with four 48IDF2/100 Weber carburetors produced an estimated 380 bhp (385 PS; 283 kW) at 5800 rpm and 406 lb⋅ft (550 N⋅m) at 4500 rpm of torque, and series specific details such as a blanked bonnet vent and a separate rear spoiler. 38 of these were built (plus 13 "Cosmetics" for the US). The Oscar India (for 1 October, the date of introduction) version, introduced in late 1978, featured an integrated tea-tray spoiler and smoother bonnet bulge. Inside, a black leather-covered dash replaced the previous walnut. The wooden dashboard did find its way back into the Vantage during the eighties, giving a more luxurious appearance. The Oscar India version also received a slight increase in power, to 390 bhp (291 kW; 395 PS). This line was produced, with some running changes, until 1989.

One of the most noticeable features was the closed-off hood bulge rather than the open scoop found on the normal V8. The grille area was also closed off, with twin driving lights inserted and a spoiler added to the bootlid.

The 1986–1989 580 'X-Pack' was a further upgrade, with Cosworth pistons and Nimrod racing-type heads producing 403 bhp (409 PS; 301 kW). A 'big bore' after-market option was also available from Works Service, with 50 mm carbs (instead of 48 mm) and straight-through exhaust system, giving 432 bhp (438 PS; 322 kW); this was the same engine as fitted to the limited-production V8 Zagato. 16-inch wheels were also now fitted. If this wasn't enough, a 450 bhp (336 kW; 456 PS) 6.3-litre version was also available from Aston Martin, and independents offered a 7-litre version.

304 Series 2 Vantage coupés were built – including 137 X-Packs (including 6 "Cosmetic" X-packs) – and 192 Volantes (in spite of only having been officially introduced in 1986, near the end of production).

Of the 'Cosmetic' Vantage (for the US Swiss and Japanese markets, with fuel injection instead of Weber carburettors), 14 Series 2 coupés and 56 Volantes were built. Cosmetic Vantages lacked the powerful Vantage engine but retained the Vantage name and most of its body alterations – though the lack of carburettors would allow for a flattened hood. From 1980, they and all federalized V8 Astons featured DOT-approved, 5 mph safety bumpers front and rear. Most of these cars have since been retrofitted with full power, European spec engines and have typically had the safety bumpers replaced with the traditional, chromed units. Since the rear license plate had to be located above the bumper on these cars, the rear bodywork was altered to accommodate it; the sheetmetal is rarely changed on converted cars. The safety bumpers had significant negative impact not just on looks, but on handling as well, as they added around 100 lb (45 kg) at each of the car's extremities, causing a pendulum effect by increasing the moment of inertia.

Although the full spec (carburettor) Vantage models were not imported into the US when new, they now qualify for entry under the DOT's 'Show and Display' rules in most US States. Federal requirements are also less strict for cars over 25 years old (as all Vantages have been since 2014).

== Performance ==
The V8 Vantage was tested by Motor in April 1981. They measured a 0-60 mph (97 km/h) time of 5.2 seconds and a top speed of 168 mph (270 km/h). It was listed in the Guinness Book of Records as the world's fastest independently road-tested production car.

== Vantage Volante ==
A Vantage Volante convertible version was also produced between 1986 and 1989. Six mechanically similar cars had been built earlier to special order, but it was not regularly available until then. The production version featured an even deeper front spoiler than fitted to the Vantage, even wider wheel arches, and extended side skirts. The Vantage Volante also had a rear spoiler, which the regular Volante did not feature. In total, 166 Vantage Volantes were built, with the last ones leaving the factory in December 1989. In 1987 Charles, Prince of Wales took delivery of a Vantage Volante, but at his request without the production car's wider wheelarches, front air dam and side skirts. This became known as the 'Prince of Wales Spec' (or PoW) and around another 26 such cars were built by the factory. These are now generally considered the most desirable of all the 1970s/80s V8 models. Combined with the PoW cars, 192 Vantage Volantes were built.

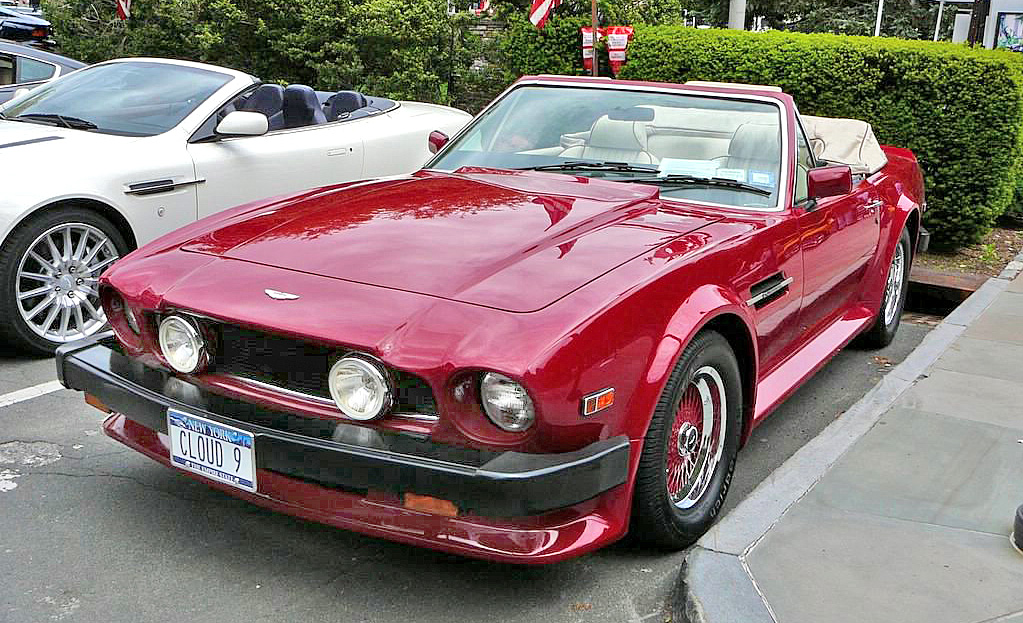
1986 V8 Vantage Volante (USA Specification)

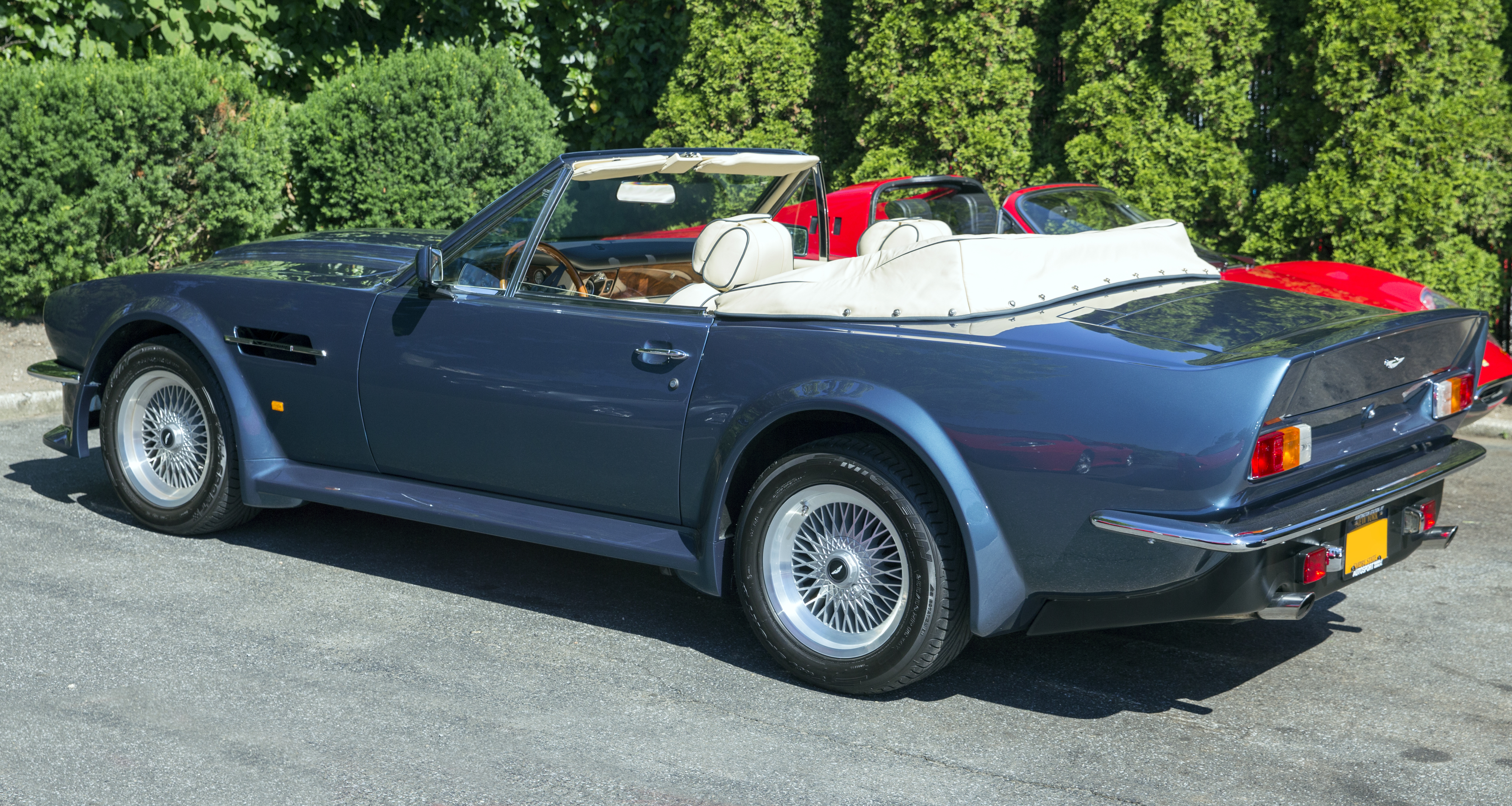
1990 Aston Martin V8 Vantage Volante X-Pack, with the big wheelarches and sideskirts

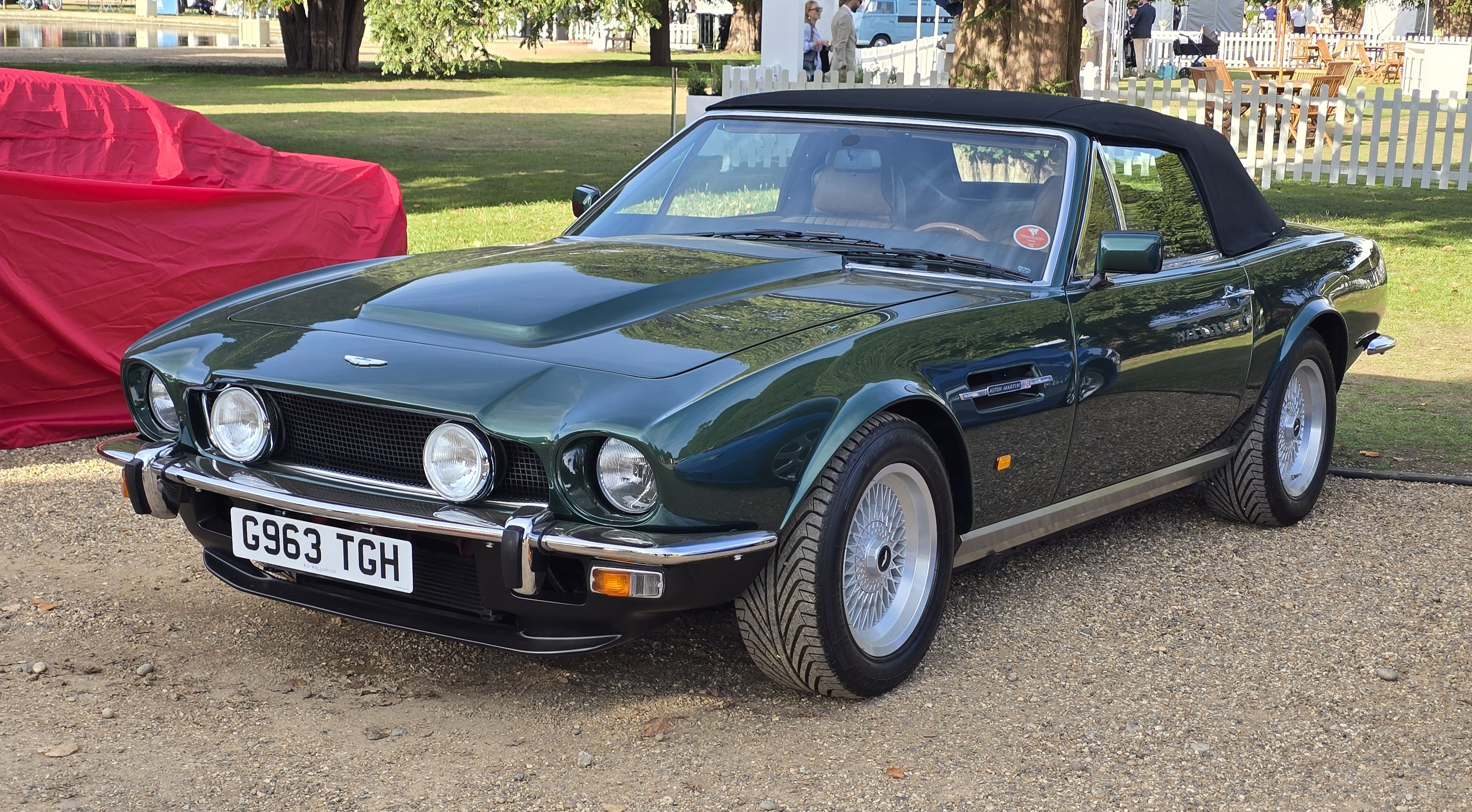
Aston Martin V8 Vantage Prince of Wales (PoW)

== V8 Zagato ==
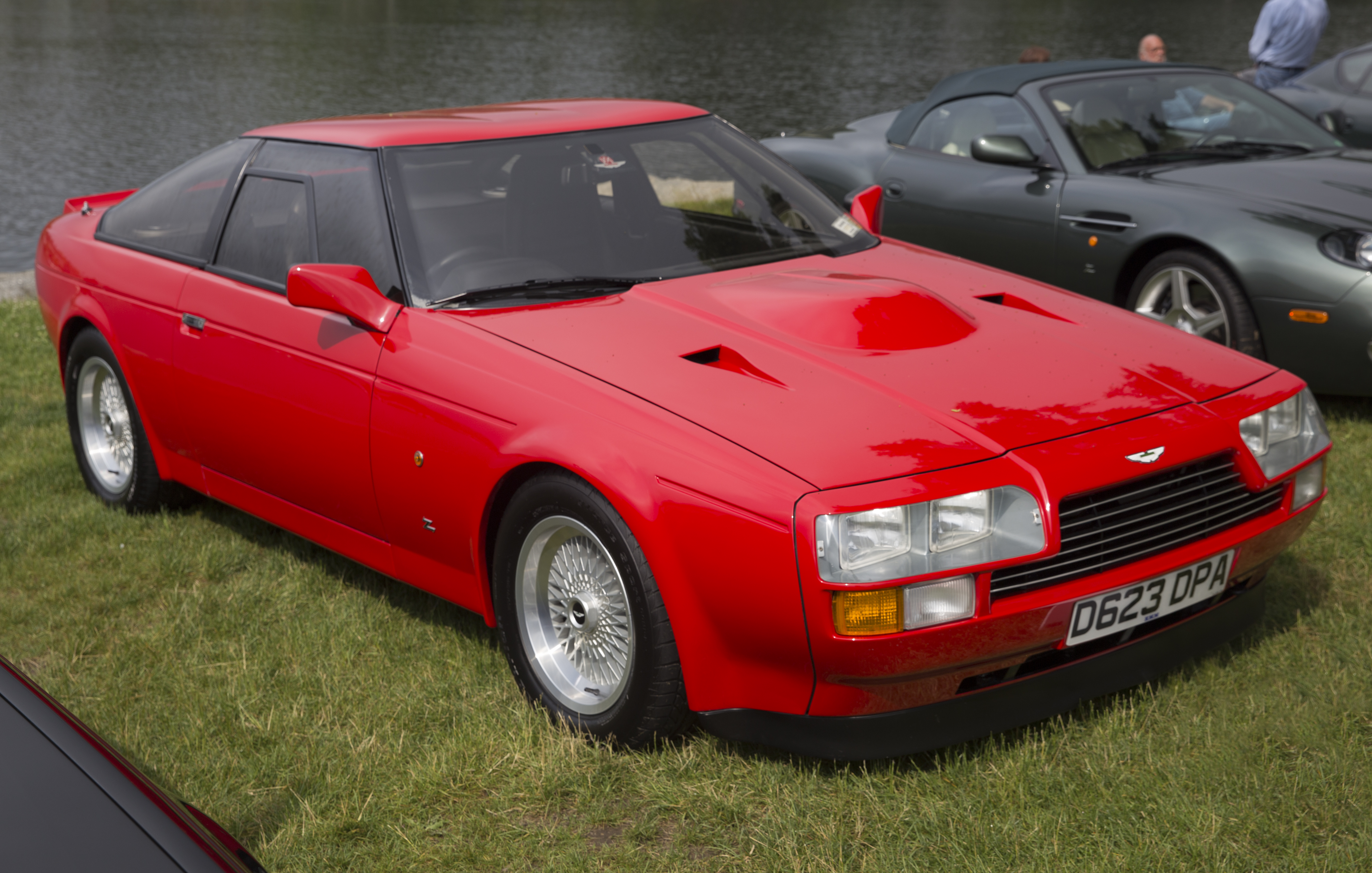
Aston Martin V8 Zagato

The V8 Zagato is a limited-edition version of the V8 Vantage with a body by the coachbuilder Zagato. The design was an angular modern interpretation of the Aston Martin DB4 GT Zagato of the 1960s. The Zagato is powered by a 432 bhp (322 kW; 438 PS) version of the Vantage's V8 engine with twin choke Weber carburettors. The coupé was first unveiled at the 1986 Geneva Motor Show, and 52 examples of the coupé and 37 of the convertible were built between 1986 and 1990.

== The Living Daylights ==
James Bond's car in the 1987 film, The Living Daylights, was a V8 Volante (convertible), registration number B549 WUU, with a few optional extras installed. The car used was a Volante owned by Aston Martin Lagonda chairman Victor Gauntlett. Later, the car is fitted with a hardtop ("winterised") at Q Branch, and these scenes feature a pair of non-Vantage V8 saloons, fitted with the same number plate as the initial car, but with Vantage badges now fitted to match the previous Vantage. The number plate B549 WUU was painted on the upper portion of Pierre Gasly's Red Bull Racing RB15's rear wing for the 2019 British Grand Prix.

The alterations and gadgets featured were:

- Head-up display
- Police band radio
- Tyre spikes
- Rocket motor behind rear number plate
- Retractable outriggers
- Heat-seeking missiles behind front fog lights
- Lasers in front wheel hubcaps
- Bulletproof windows and body
- Self-destruct system

The car returns to the franchise in the film No Time to Die where James Bond drives it to return to MI6 and when he and Madeleine go to Norway to visit her childhood home as well as meeting Mathilde, their daughter. At the end of the movie, the V8 Vantage would be driven by Madeleine Swann as she takes her daughter Mathilde to Matera and tells her the story of James Bond.

The 2026 video game 007 First Light again features the V8 Vantage.

== In other films ==
In the James Bond parody Johnny English Strikes Again, Johnny English drives an Aston Martin V8 Vantage similar to the one used by James Bond, though it is coloured red, less modified, and was provided by Rowan Atkinson, who had purchased it six months before filming started.
