= Victor Gauntlett =

English entrepreneur and car enthusiast

Malcolm Victor Gauntlett (20 May 1942 – 31 March 2003) was an English petrochemical entrepreneur and car enthusiast, best known for forming the largest independent petrol retail business in the United Kingdom, and for reviving Aston Martin.

== Biography ==
Malcolm Victor Gauntlett was born in Surrey. After attending St Marylebone Grammar School and a short period in the Territorial Armyhe took a short service commission as an officer in the RAF, where he trained as a pilot. After leaving he was commissioned into the Kent and County of London Yeomanry.

Among those who worked for him, Gauntlett was known as "MVG".

A Freeman of the City of London, in 2002 he was appointed master of the Worshipful Company of Coachmakers and Coach Harness Makers. As a result of his death halfway through his year as Master of the Worshipful Company, they agreed to set up an annual scholarship in his name.

=== Petroleum ===
After leaving the air force, Gauntlett joined British Petroleum in 1963, moving in 1967 to Compagnie Francaise des Petroles, the parent company of Total S.A., in France and then London.

In 1972, he founded independent oil company Hays Petroleum Services, which traded as Pace Petroleum. While the product came from the major producers, shrewd buying and efficient distribution made a healthy business. By 1980 Gauntlett had created one of Britain's biggest independent petrol suppliers, delivering to more than 450 garages. In 1983 he sold a share in Hays/Pace to the Kuwait Investment Authority, which bought the whole company from Gauntlett in 1986.

After selling a 75% stake in Aston Martin to Ford in 1987 (but remaining as shareholder and chairman until 1992), Gauntlett founded Proteus Petroleum, which in 1995 was voted UK Oil Company of the Year. In 1998 he sold the business to Texaco, but remained chairman until 2000.

=== Automotive interests ===
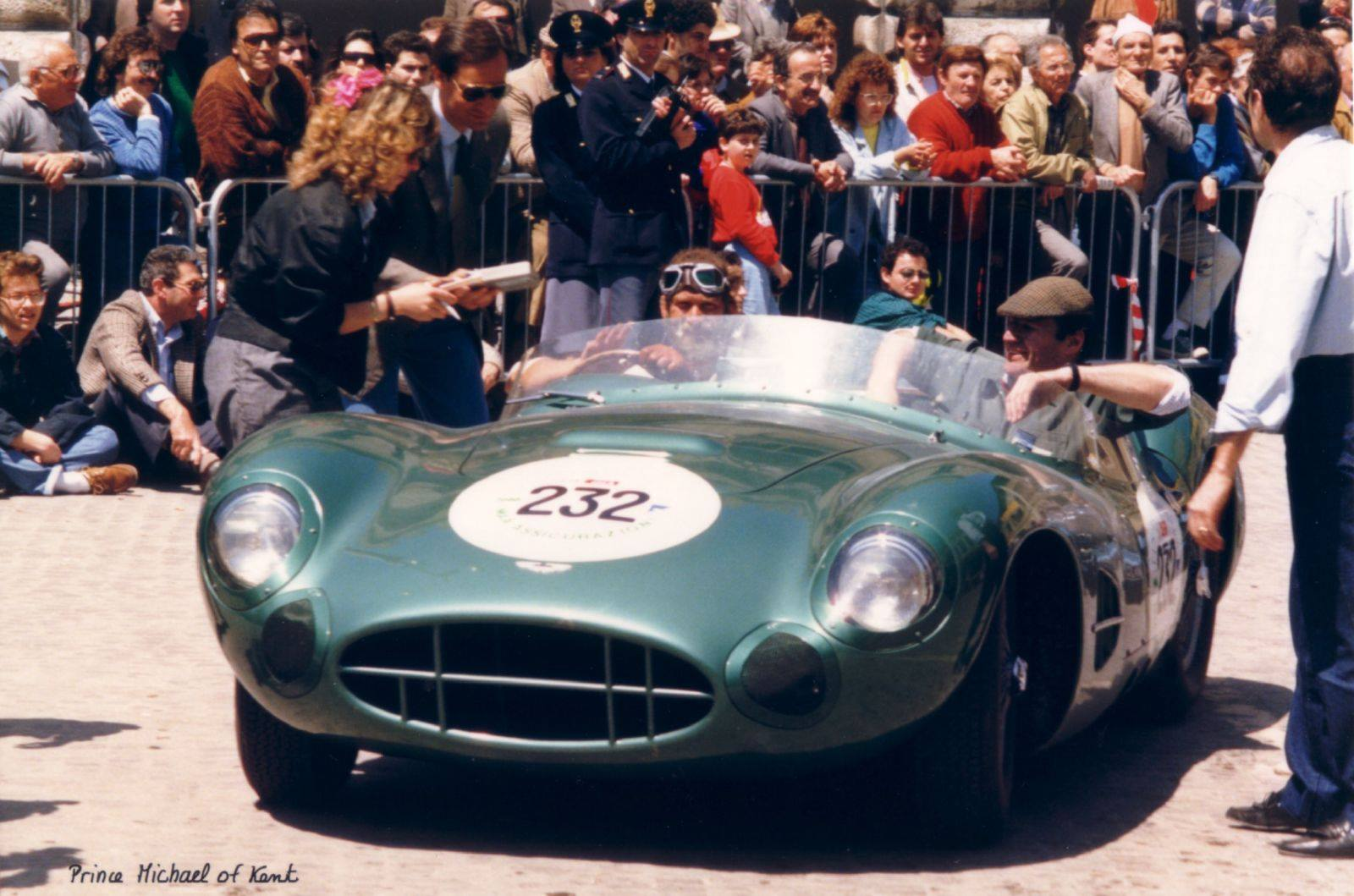
Gauntlett (right) with Prince Michael of Kent in Aston Martin DBR2 during the Mille Miglia reenactment race 21 to 23 May 1987, here in Pesaro.

Gauntlett loved classic cars, especially Bentleys and Aston Martins. He enjoyed racing Bentleys in club events, and owned a 4.5-litre "blower" Bentley which before World War II Tim Birkin had lapped Brooklands at 104 mph (167 km/h).

Through Pace Petroleum, Gauntlett sponsored motor racing events, initially local to Farnham but expanding to a Great Britain scale, including Formula Ford 2000, RAC Hill Climb and Rally Championships. In 1980 Morgan racer Norman Stechman introduced Gauntlett to Peter Morgan, resulting in "Pace Petroleum Team Morgan" featuring Stechman in Prodsports and Rob Wells in Modsports for the 1981 season. Pace was Nigel Mansell's personal sponsor in his first two years of Formula One.

After selling Aston Martin, Gauntlett returned to the classic scene and became a trustee of the National Motor Museum at Beaulieu. Through this association he saved the Napier Railton for the country, topping up the UK National Lottery funding with the British Racing Drivers' Club and comedian Rowan Atkinson to keep the car at its home at Brooklands. In 1999, Gauntlett and Prince Michael of Kent took a blower 4.5 Bentley from London to Moscow. He was an active supporter of the Le Mans classic parades in the eighties until they banned him for driving too fast.

As a consultant to a series of London banks, in 2002 Gauntlett was appointed chairman of Automotive Technik, manufacturers of the Pinzgauer military all-terrain vehicle.

=== Aston Martin ===
As worldwide sales of Aston Martin reduced to 150 per year, chairman Alan Curtis together with fellow shareholders American Peter Sprague and Canadian George Minden, had almost chosen to shut down the production side of the business and concentrate on service and restoration. Curtis attended the 1980 Pace sponsored Stirling Moss benefit day at Brands Hatch, and met fellow Farnham resident Gauntlett.

Gauntlett bought a 10% stake in Aston Martin for £500,000 via Pace Petroleum in 1980, with Tim Hearley of CH Industrials taking a similar share. Pace and CHI took over as joint 50/50 owners at the beginning of 1981, with Gauntlett as executive chairman. Gauntlett also led the sales team, and after some development and a lot of publicity when it became the world's fastest 4-seater production car, was able to sell the Aston Martin Lagonda in Persian Gulf states, particularly Oman, Kuwait and Qatar.

Understanding it would take some time to develop new Aston Martin products, they bought Tickford to develop automotive products for other companies. Products included a Tickford Austin Metro, a Tickford Ford Capri and even Tickford train interiors, particularly on the Jaguar XJS. Pace continued sponsoring racing events, and now sponsored all Aston Martin Owners Club events, taking a Tickford engined Nimrod Group C car owned by AMOC President Viscount Downe, which came third in the Manufacturers Championship in both 1982 and 1983. It also finished seventh in the 1982 24 Hours of Le Mans race. However, sales of production cars were now at an all-time low of 30 cars produced in 1982.

As trading became tighter in the petroleum market, and Aston requiring more time and money, Gauntlett agreed to sell Hays/Pace to Kuwait Investment Office in September 1983. As Aston Martin required greater investment, he also agreed to sell his share holding to American importer and Greek shipping tycoon Peter Livanos, who invested via his joint venture company with Nick and John Papanicolaou, ALL Inc. Gauntlett remained chairman of the AML company 55% owned by ALL, with Tickford a 50/50 venture between ALL and CHI. The uneasy relationship was ended when ALL exercised options to buy a larger share in AML; CHI's residual shares were exchanged for CHI's complete ownership of Tickford, which retained development of existing Aston Martin projects. In 1984, Titan the main shipping company of the Papanicolaou's was in trouble, so Livanos's father George bought out the Papanicolaou's shares in ALL, while Gauntlett again became a shareholder with a 25% holding in AML. The deal valued Aston Martin/AML at £2 million, the year it built its 10,000th car.

Although as a result Aston Martin had to make 60 members of the workforce redundant, Gauntlett bought a stake in Italian styling house Zagato, and resurrected its collaboration with Aston Martin. A revived economy and successful sales of limited edition Vantage, and 52 Volante Zagato coupes at £86,000 each, brought in enough funds to complete the Aston Martin Virage, the first new Aston launched in 20 years in 1988.

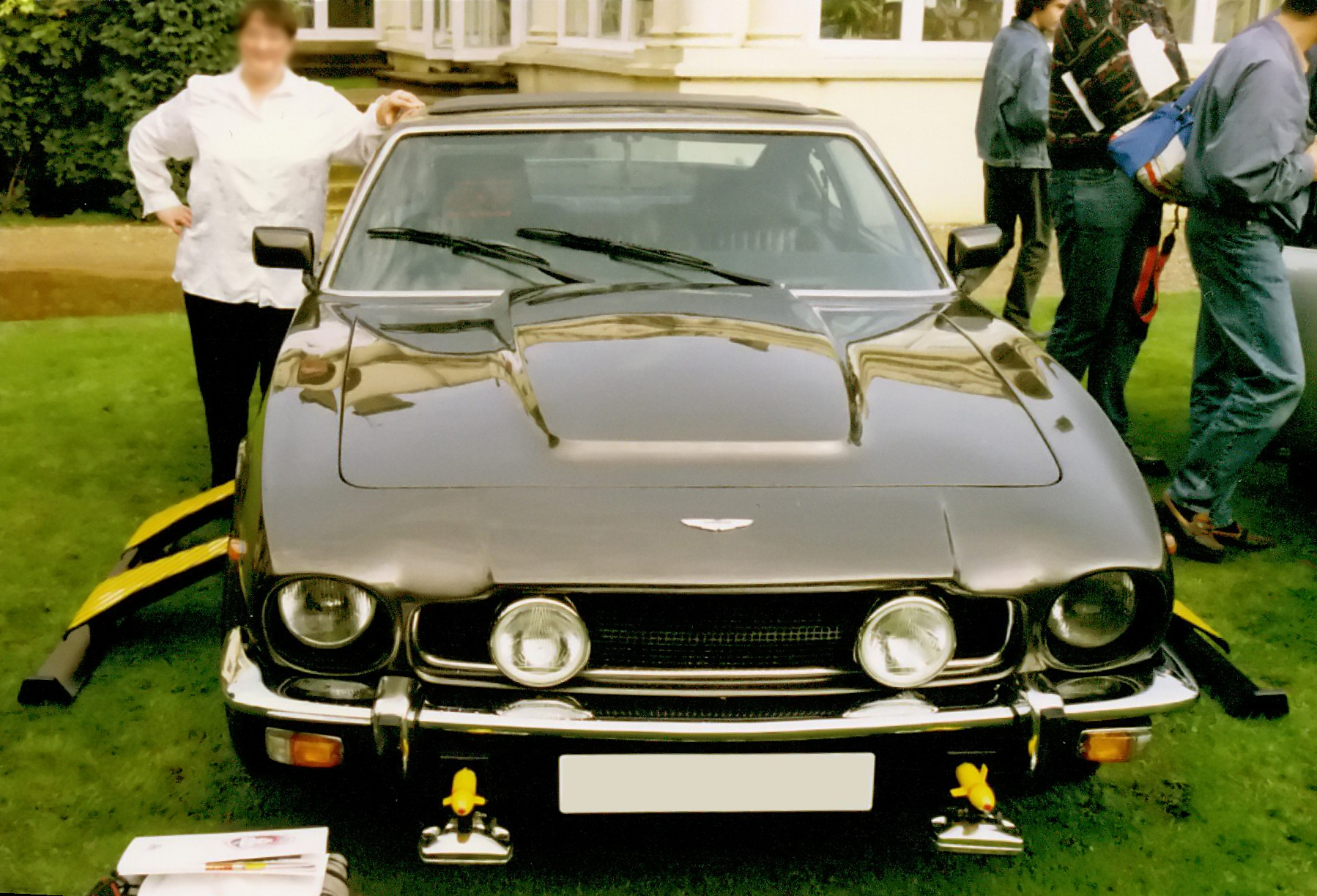
Aston Martin Volante from The Living Daylights

In 1986, Gauntlett negotiated the return of fictional British secret agent James Bond to Aston Martin. Cubby Broccoli had chosen to recast the character using actor Timothy Dalton, in an attempt to re-root the Bond-brand back to a more Sean Connery-like feel. Gauntlett supplied his personal pre-production Vantage for use in the filming of "The Living Daylights," and sold a Volante to Broccoli for use at his home in America. Gauntlett turned down the role of a KGB colonel in the film: "I would have loved to have done it but really could not afford the time."

Although the company was doing well, Gauntlett knew it needed extra funds to survive long term. In May 1987, Gauntlett and Prince Michael of Kent were staying at the home of Contessa Maggi, the wife of the founder of the original Mille Miglia, while watching the revival event. Another house guest was Walter Hayes, vice-president of Ford of Europe. Despite problems over the previous acquisition of AC Cars, Hayes saw the potential of the brand and the discussion resulted in Ford taking a share holding in September 1987.

Although Gauntlett was contractually to stay as chairman for two years, his racing interests took Aston back into sports car racing in 1989 with limited European success. However, with engine rule changes for the 1990 season and the launch of the new Aston Martin Volante model, Ford provided the limited supply of Cosworth engines to the Jaguar Cars racing team. As the "small Aston"/DB7 would require a large engineering input, Ford agreed to take full control of Aston Martin, and Gauntlett handed the company chairmanship to Hayes in 1991.

=== Aviation ===
A qualified pilot from his time in the RAF, Gauntlett owned a number of aircraft through his life, including De Havilland aircraft a Dragon Rapide, Tiger Moth, Leopard Moth, Fox Moth, a Dove, Chipmunk; a North American Harvard, a Douglas Dakota C-47; and a Mk1a Spitfire; he had also sponsored aerobatic teams through his Petroleum Companies.

He was known to attend historic aircraft auctions and indeed purchased a General Aircraft Cygnet from the former Strathallan Collection and donated it to the National Museum of Flight at East Fortune when the Museum dropped out of the bidding due to budget constraints.

Gauntlett was a long-standing council member of The Air League, which promotes all aspects of British aviation, and had been due to assume the league's chairmanship in June 2003. He was a trustee of the RAF Museum and the Maritime Air Trust and a retired trustee of the Museum of Army Flying at Middle Wallop. He was appointed Honorary Air Commodore of No 4624 Squadron of the Royal Auxiliary Air Force, based at RAF Brize Norton.

=== Personal life ===
Gauntlett married his wife Jean in 1966, and the couple had a daughter and three sons.

=== Death ===
Victor Gauntlett died on 31 March 2003 and is buried in the churchyard at St Michael's Church, Yanworth, Gloucestershire, UK.

== Quotations ==
- "I'm half overgrown schoolboy, half hard-nosed businessman" – Gauntlett on himself
- "I wouldn't be going into it unless I thought there was money to be made. I am quite convinced there is a niche for a high-quality product. There will always be the people who want the super-duper" – on taking over Aston Martin
- "I feel I am more akin to the high-class jewellery business or a famous art gallery than anything else" – commenting on his role in making cars
- Asked: "How can you make a small fortune out of Aston Martin?" Gauntlett replied "Start with a big one."
- On the importance of being decisive, his self-deprecating motto was " Often wrong, never in doubt!"

Business positions
Preceded by Alan Curtis (Chairman)	Executive Chairman of Aston Martin; 1981 - September 1991	Succeeded by Walter Hayes
