= Aston Martin V8 =

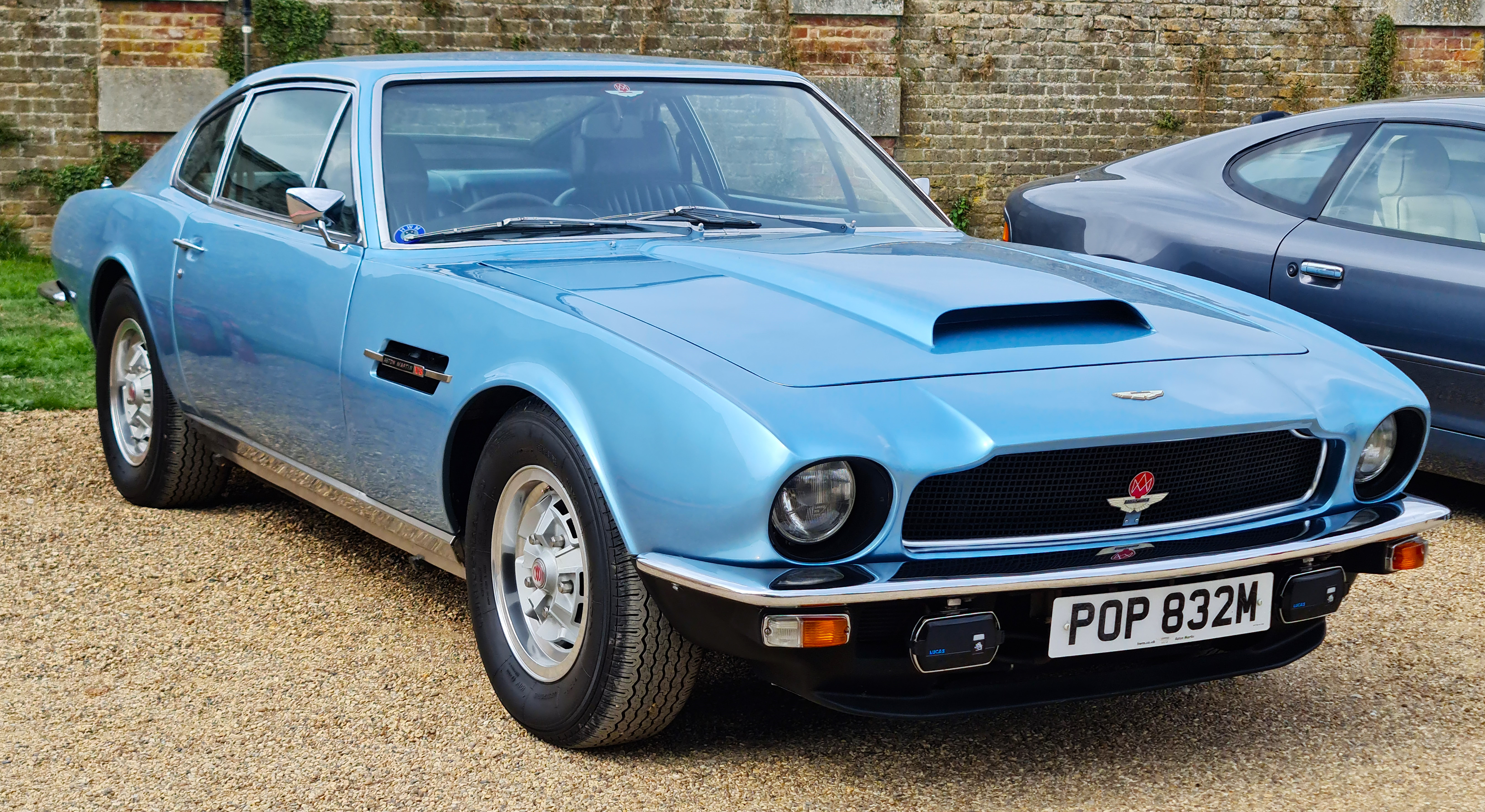
- 1974 Aston Martin V8 coupé

Overview
- Manufacturer: Aston Martin
- Production: 1969–1989; 4,021 built; (incl. Vantage & Volante)
- Assembly: United Kingdom: Newport Pagnell, Buckinghamshire, England
- Designer: William Towns

Body and chassis
- Class: Grand tourer
- Body style: 2-door coupé; 2-door convertible
- Layout: FR layout
- Related: Aston Martin DBS; Aston Martin RHAM/1; Aston Martin V8 Vantage (1977)

Powertrain
- Engine: 5.3 L V8
- Transmission: 5-speed ZF manual all-synchromesh; 3-speed Chrysler automatic

Dimensions
- Wheelbase: 2,610 mm (102.8 in)
- Length: 4,585 mm (180.5 in)
- Width: 1,830 mm (72.0 in)
- Height: 1,330 mm (52.4 in)
- Kerb weight: 1,820 kg (4,010 lb)(approx)

Chronology
- Predecessor: Aston Martin DBS V8 (1969–1972)
- Successor: Aston Martin Virage

The Aston Martin V8 is a grand tourer manufactured by Aston Martin in the United Kingdom from 1969 to 1989. As with all traditional Aston Martins, it was entirely handbuilt, each car requiring 1,200 man-hours to finish.

Aston Martin were looking to replace the DB6 model and had designed a larger, more modern looking car. The engine was not ready, however, so in 1967 the company released the DBS with the straight-six Vantage engine from the DB6. Two years later, Tadek Marek's V8 was ready, and Aston released the DBS V8. With the demise of the straight-six Vantage in 1973, the DBS V8, now restyled and called simply the Aston Martin V8, became the company's mainstream car for nearly two decades. It was eventually retired in favour of the Virage in 1989.

== DBS V8 ==
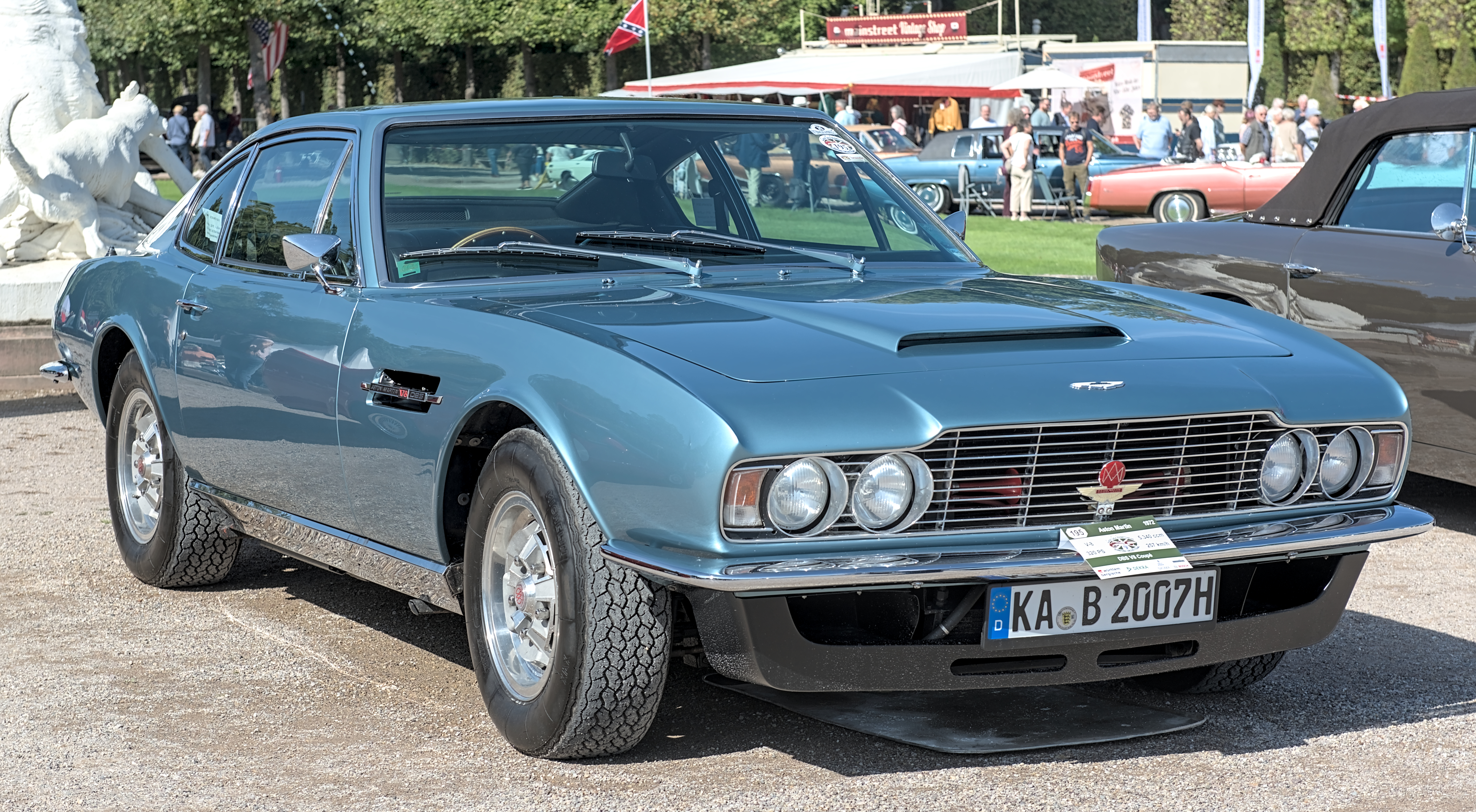
1972 Aston Martin DBS V8

From 1969 through 1972, Aston's flagship model was the DBS V8. Though the body and name was shared with the six-cylinder DBS, the V8 sold for much more. The body was a modern reinterpretation of the traditional Aston Martin look, with a squared-off grille and four headlights (William Towns admitted that the rear quarters were "borrowed" from the early Ford Mustang). Distinguishing features of the V8 model are the larger front air dam, it was the first Aston Martin to fit low profile tyres with its 225/70VR15 rubber fitted to alloy wheels - some six-cylinder DBS cars also used the V8's alloys. The tail lights were taken from the Hillman Hunter.

A road test report of the time noted that the car had gained 250 lb (113 kg) in weight with the fitting of the V8 in place of the previously used six-cylinder unit, despite the manufacturer's assurance that the engine weighed only 30 lb (14 kg) more than the older straight-six. Other contributions to the weight gain included heavier ventilated brake discs, air conditioning, fatter tyres, a new and stronger ZF gearbox as well as some extra bodywork beneath the front bumper.

Marek's V8 engine displaced 5,340 cc (5.3 L; 325.9 cu in) and used Bosch fuel injection. Output was not officially released, but estimates center around 315 hp (235 kW). The DBS V8 could reach 100 km/h (62 mph) in 7.1 seconds and had a top speed of 242 km/h (150 mph). 402 DBS V8s were built. A DBS V8 was planned to be used by Roger Moore's character Brett Sinclair in the television show, The Persuaders! but no V8 car was available at that time so a six-cylinder DBS was modified to look like a V8 model for use in the show.

=== DBS V8 by Ogle Design ===
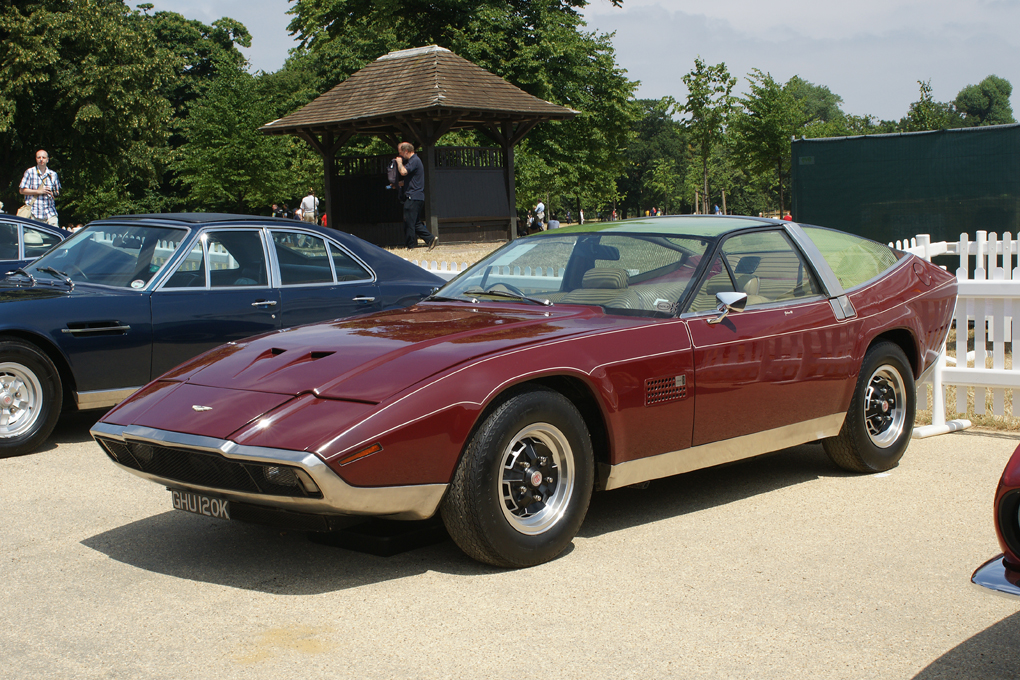
DBS V8 by Ogle Design (chassis number DBSV8/10381/RC) at Aston Martin's centennial celebration in July 2013

The DBS V8 by Ogle Design was introduced in 1972 at the Montreal Motor Show. It is based on a DBS V8 and two cars were commissioned by the tobacco company W.O.Wills to promote their new premium brand of cigarettes: one show car with chassis number DBSV8/10380/R and one road going car with chassis number DBSV8/10381/RC. A third "replica" car was commissioned by a private party.

== V8 ==
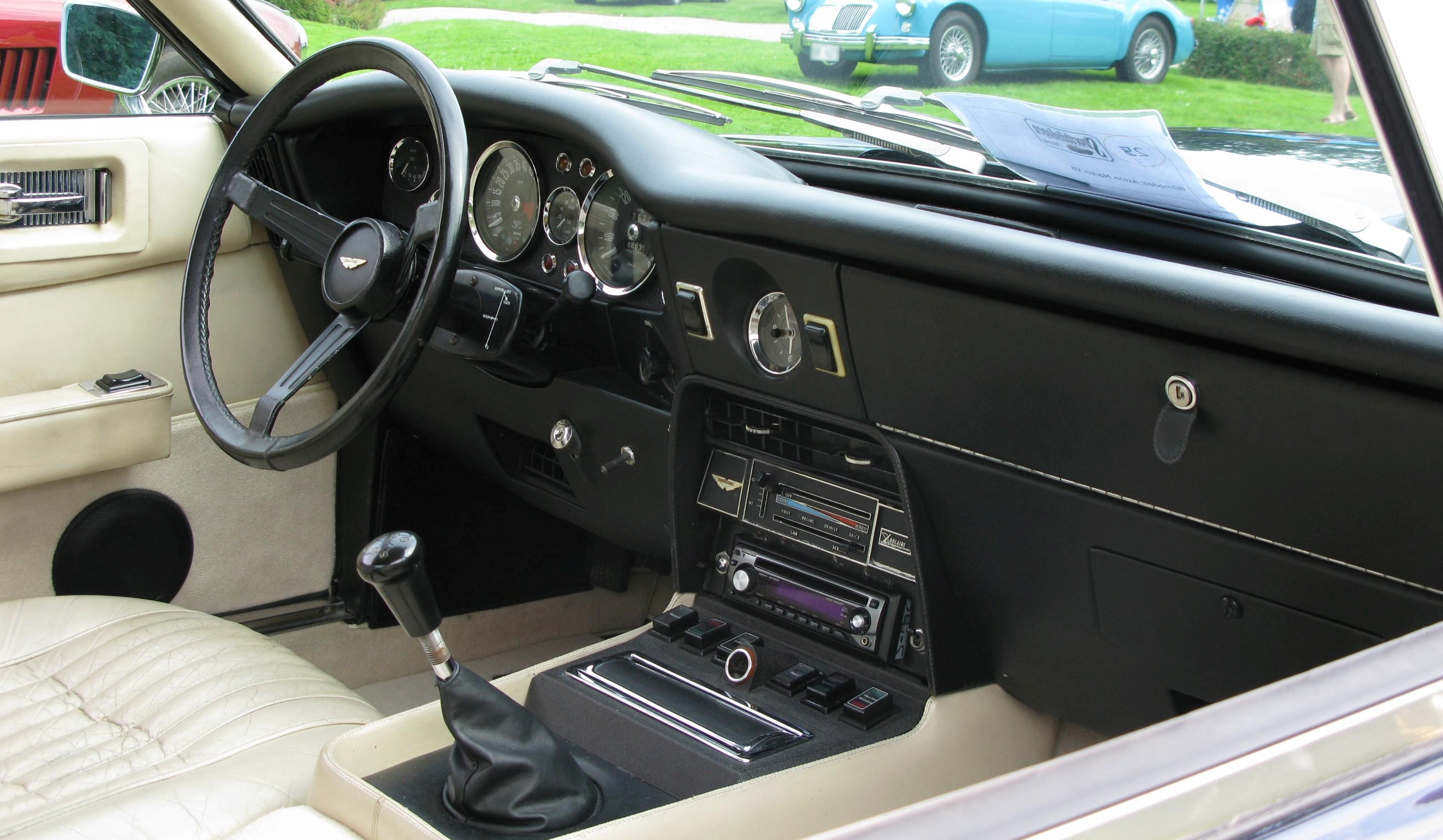
1973 Aston Martin V8 interior

In April 1972, the DBS V8 became just the Aston Martin V8 as the six-cylinder DBS was dropped, leaving just this car and the six-cylinder Vantage in production.

=== AM V8 ===
The V8 became known as the AM V8, a model retroactively referred to as the Series 2 V8 to separate it from later models. Visual differences included twin quartz-halogen headlights and a mesh grille, a front design which was to last until the end of production in 1989. AM V8 cars, produced from May 1972 through July 1973, used a similar engine to the DBS V8, albeit with Bosch fuel injection rather than the earlier carburetors. Just 288 Series 2 cars were built. Although David Brown had left the company, he had overseen development of this model. The first 34 cars still carried leftover "DBS V8" badging.

=== Series 3 ===
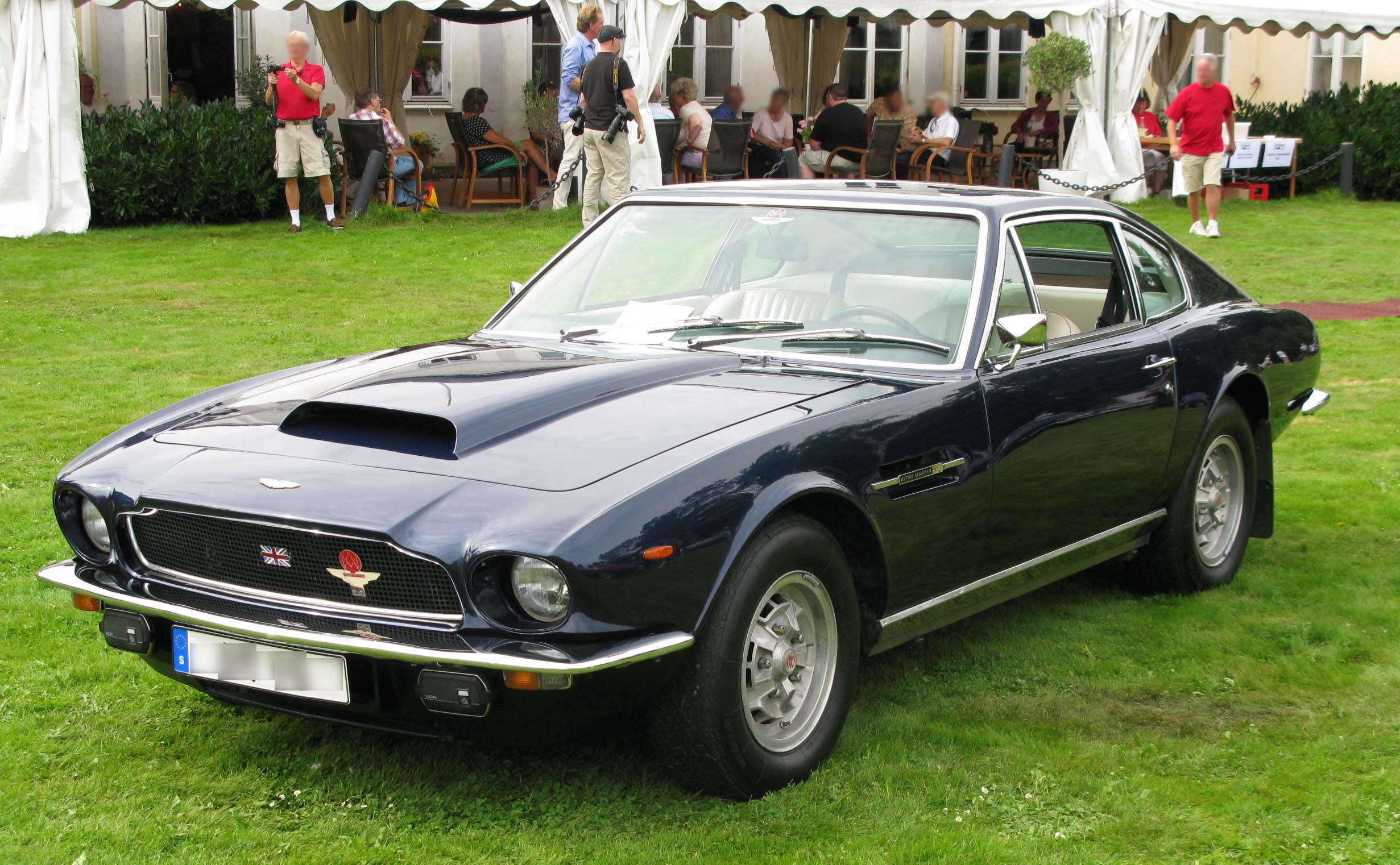
1973 AM V8 with the tall Series 3 bonnet scoop

The car switched back to Weber carburetors for the Series 3 in 1973, ostensibly to help the car pass new stricter emissions standards in California but most likely because Aston Martin was unable to make the Bosch fuel injection system work correctly. These cars are distinguished by a taller bonnet scoop to accommodate four twin-choke (two-barrel) Weber carbs. The car produced 310 hp (231 kW; 314 PS) and could reach 60 mph (97 km/h) in 6.1 seconds with an automatic transmission or 5.7 with a manual. Performance suffered with emissions regulations, falling to 288 hp (215 kW; 292 PS) in 1976. The next year, a more powerful "Stage 1" engine with new camshafts and exhaust brought it up to 305 hp (227 kW; 309 PS).

In Japan, the new catalyzed model's engine was the same as the one sold in the United States. Going on sale in 1977, it met the strict 1976 emissions regulations thanks to the catalytic converter and secondary air injection just after the exhaust valves. Japanese buyers were restricted to the three-speed, Chrysler Torqueflite automatic transmission. While Aston Martin did not generally publish outputs at this time, Japan's MITI required figures to be listed; the importer claimed 285 PS DIN (210 kW; 281 bhp) at 4,600 rpm and 45.7 kg⋅m (448 N⋅m; 331 lb⋅ft) at 4,600 rpm. One quirk of the Japanese market at the time is that approximately a quarter of the V8 Saloons sold there in this period were chauffeur-driven, with the owners riding in the back seat.

Production of Series 3 cars lasted from 1973 through October 1978, but was halted for all of 1975. 967 examples were produced in this time. While earlier V8 cars have louvers cut into the little panel mounted beneath the rear windshield, the Series 3 and later cars instead have a small lip at the bottom of this panel, just ahead of the leading edge of the boot lid.

=== Series 4 ("Oscar India") ===
Aston Martin V8 Volante Series 1 (Series 4 Saloon equivalent)

The "Oscar India" specification was introduced in October 1978 at the Birmingham International Motor Show. Visually, the former scoop on the bonnet gave way to a closed "power bulge", while a spoiler was integrated into the tail. Most Oscar India cars were equipped with a Chrysler "Torqueflite" three-speed automatic transmission, with wood trim fitted for the first time since the DB2/4 of the 1950s. Just 352 Oscar India models were built from 1978 through 1985. The power of the now de-smogged engines kept dropping on American market cars, down to a low of 245 hp (183 kW) in the early eighties.

The convertible "Volante" was introduced in June 1978, but featured the Series 4 bonnet from the start – a few months before the coupé received the Oscar India update. The Volante Series 1 weighs 70 kg (155 lb) more than the coupé, due to the necessity of reinforcing the frame. At this time, manufacturing a V8 Volante took about four months from beginning to end.

US market cars received much larger, "5 mph" bumpers beginning with the 1980 model year, adding weight, moment of inertia, and somewhat marring the car's lines. Owners of US-specified cars often modify them to have the slimmer European bumpers. By 1981, the success of the Volante meant that the coupé model was only built on individual demand. The 1980s cars were also tuned to provide much better fuel economy, up by some thirty percent. Beginning in 1985, cars destined for the Saudi market were also requiring to be fitted with the 5 mph bumpers.

=== Series 5 ===
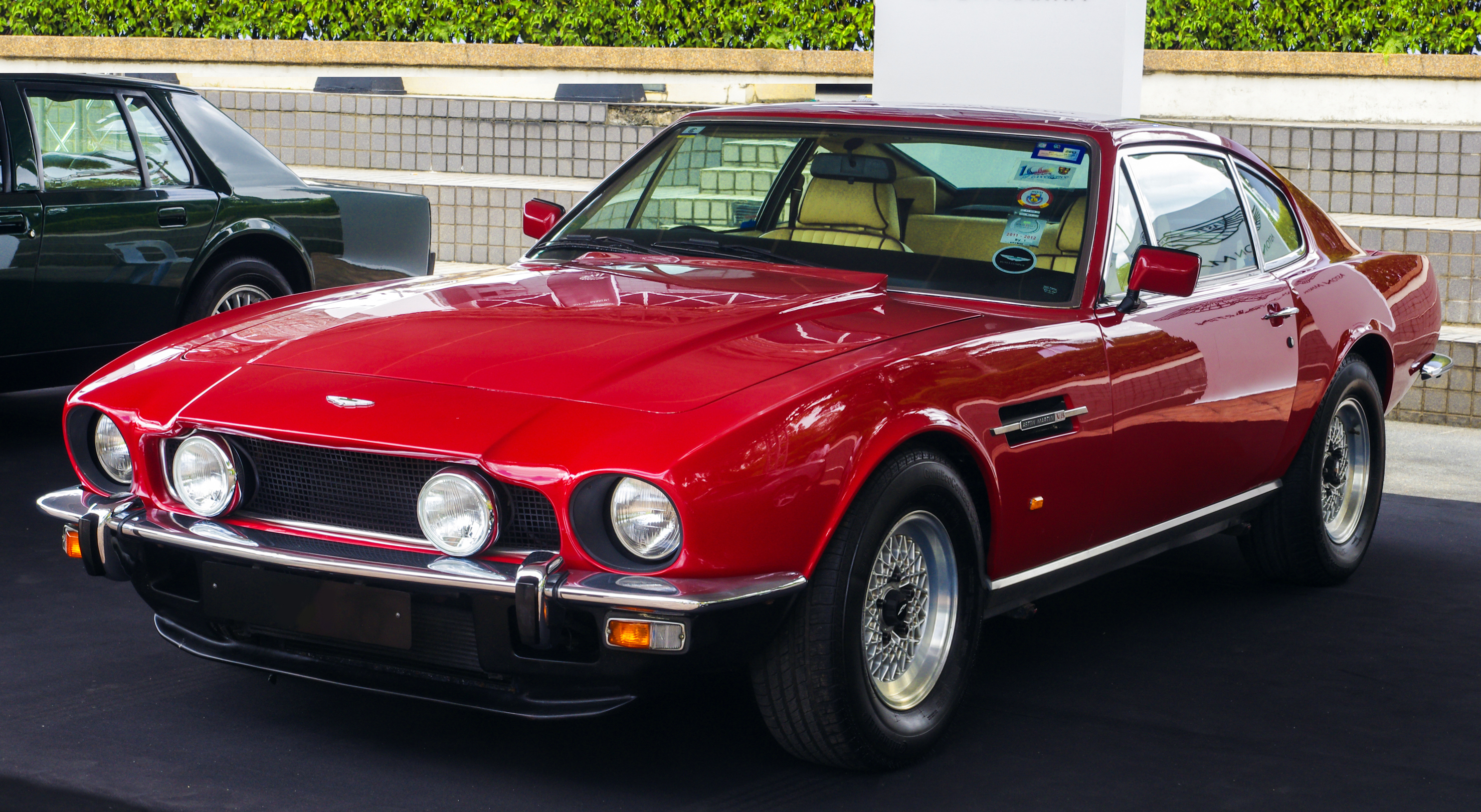
Aston Martin V8 Saloon Series 5 with the later flat bonnet

The fuel-injected Series 5 cars were introduced in January 1986 at the New York International Auto Show. The compact Weber/Marelli system no longer needed the space of the previous carburettors, so the bonnet bulge was virtually eliminated. 405 Series 5 cars were built before production ceased in 1989. The Volante Series 2 received the same changes; 216 were built.

=== Lagonda ===
Between 1974 and 1976, seven four-door Lagonda saloons were produced based on the Aston Martin V8, with a Lagonda-style outline grille fitted within the space normally filled by the standard Aston Martin grille.

== Production figures ==
- DBS V8: 402
- V8 Saloon Series 2: 288
- V8 Saloon Series 3: 967
- V8 Saloon Series 4: 352
- V8 Saloon Series 5: 405
- V8 Volante Series 1: 656
- V8 Volante Series 2: 245
- V8 Vantage Series 1: 38 + 13 US-spec models with regular engine
- V8 Vantage Series 2: 304 + 14 US-spec models with regular engine
- V8 Vantage Volante: 192 + 56 US-spec models with regular engine
- V8 Vantage Zagato/Vantage Volante Zagato: 89

== James Bond ==
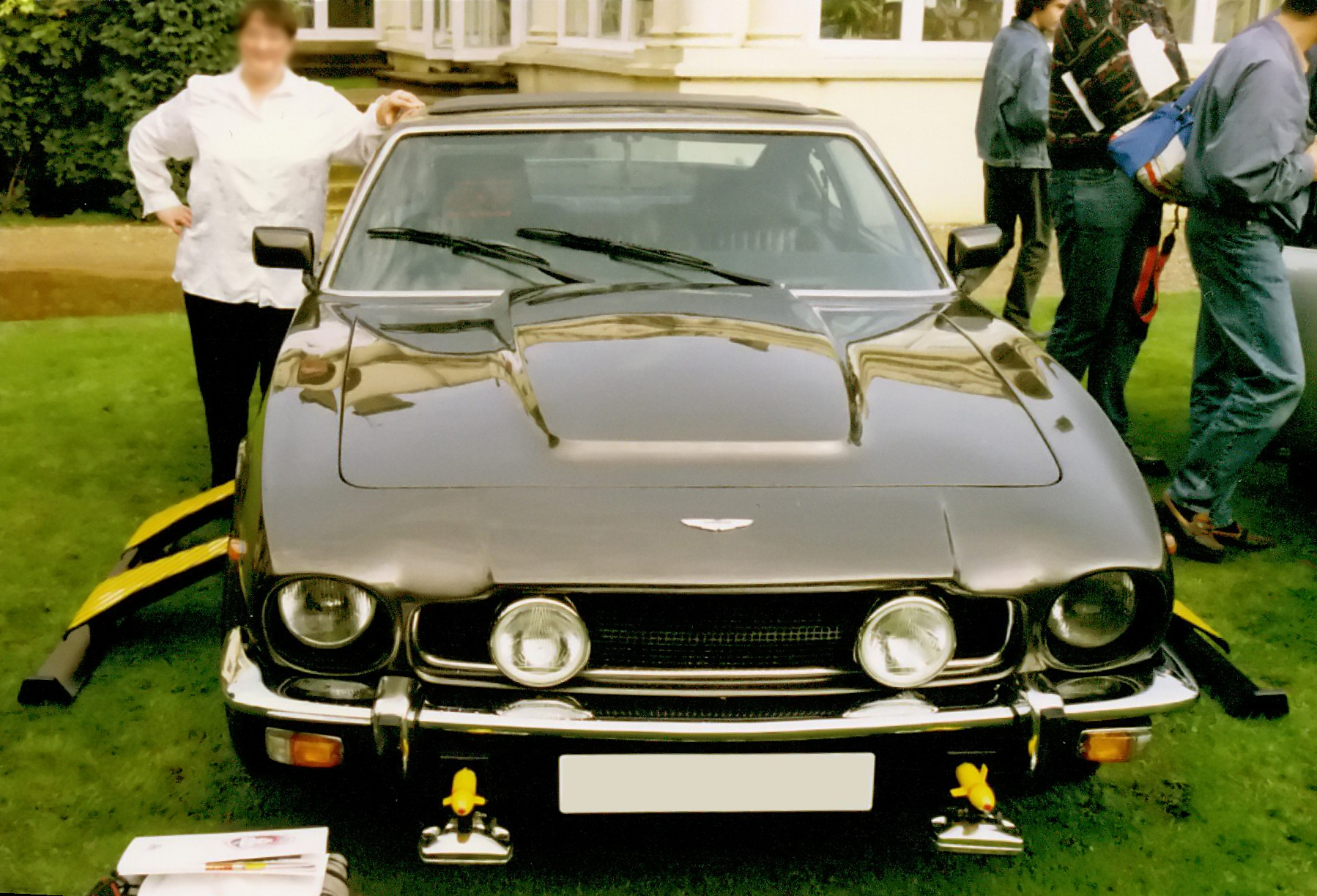
Aston Martin V8 Volante from The Living Daylights

In 1986, Timothy Dalton took over the role of James Bond from Roger Moore and EON Productions had decided to bring Aston Martin back to the Bond franchise with the new 007 now paired with a series 4 model in the film, The Living Daylights. However, the film caused some confusion for viewers (even those quite familiar with Aston Martin models of that era). At the beginning of the film, the car is a V8 Volante (convertible). The actual car used in these scenes was a V8 Volante owned by Aston Martin Lagonda chairman Victor Gauntlett. Later, the car is seen being fitted with a hardtop ("winterised") at Q Branch. However, later scenes actually feature a pair of V8 Saloons with the same number plate as the Volante seen in the beginning of the movie, retrofitted with other "optional extras" such as spiked tyres, skis, lasers, and missiles. Clearly, the car was intended to be seen as a V8 Volante with hardtop.

The V8 coupé made a comeback in the James Bond film No Time to Die. Aston Martin CEO Dr. Andy Palmer confirmed on 20 June 2019 that the V8 would make another appearance sporting the same registration it had in The Living Daylights 32 years prior.
