= Aston Martin V8 Zagato =

Overview
- Manufacturer: Aston Martin
- Also called: Aston Martin V8 Vantage Zagato; Aston Martin Vantage Zagato
- Production: 1986–1990; 89 produced; (52 coupés and 37 convertibles)
- Designer: Giuseppe Mittino at Zagato

Body and chassis
- Class: Grand tourer
- Body style: 2-door coupé; 2-door convertible
- Layout: FR layout
- Related: Aston Martin V8 Vantage

Powertrain
- Engine: 5.3 L (5341 cc) V8

Chronology
- Predecessor: Aston Martin DB4 GT Zagato
- Successor: Aston Martin DB7 Zagato

The Aston Martin V8 Zagato is a grand tourer manufactured by Aston Martin. Just 52 examples of the coupé and 37 of the convertible were built between 1986 and 1990. The coupé was first unveiled at the 1986 Geneva Motor Show, and orders were quickly taken despite only showing the drawing of the car.

The decision to build the later convertible was controversial – all 52 coupés had already been purchased at the height of the supercar speculation market and owners felt that producing additional cars would lower the value of the coupés. The convertibles consistently fetch higher prices than the roofed versions.

As the name suggests, the V8 Zagato was based on the Aston Martin V8 Vantage but with a body by the coachbuilder Zagato.

The design was an angular modern interpretation of the Aston Martin DB4 GT Zagato of the 1960s. The squared off grille was especially controversial. The Zagato was powered by a 430 bhp (321 kW; 436 PS) V8 engine with twin choke Weber carburettors. The all-alloy car could reach 300 km/h (186 mph).

It was a luxurious car with a price tag of $156,600 at the time, but with the high rarity, and being released at the supercar price boom of 1987 to 1990, and by the end of the decade, cars were changing hands for £450,000. The later convertible sold for $171,000.

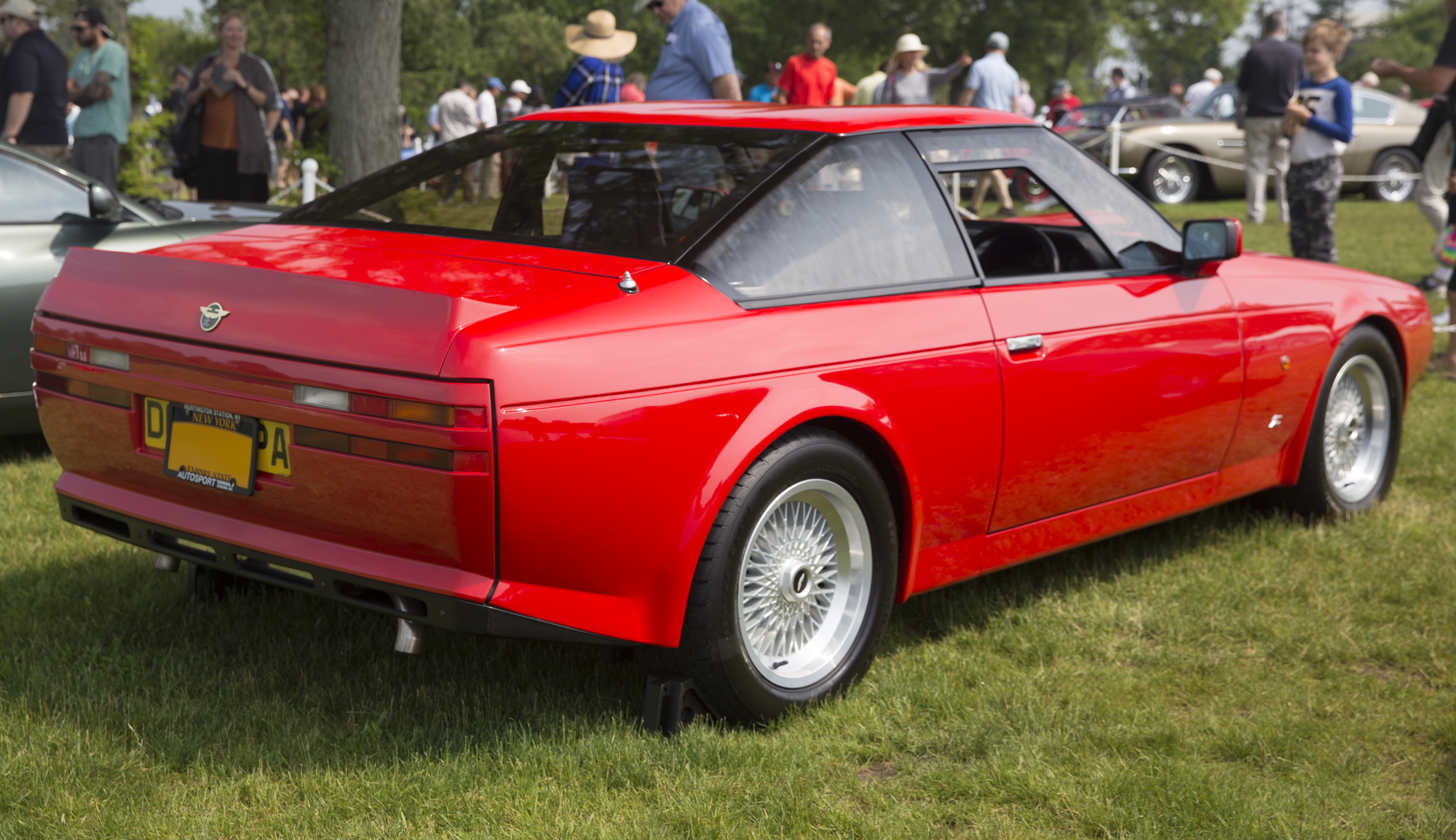
1987 V8 Zagato (rear view)

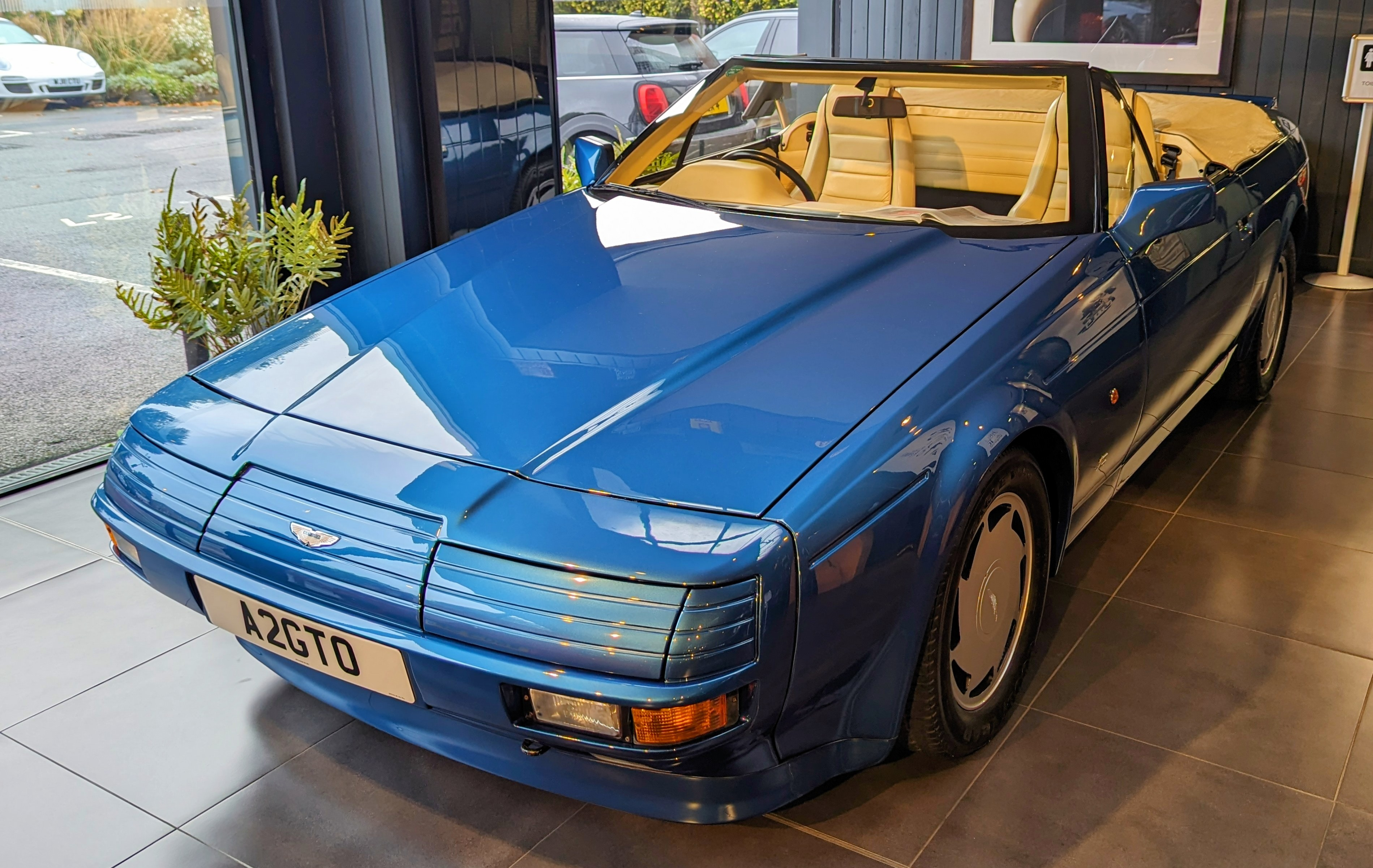
Zagato Volante; note different front end and flat bonnet

The comedian Rowan Atkinson purchased the first right-hand-drive car produced in 1998 and had it converted to Aston Martin Owners' Club racing series C2 specifications. He crashed it in July 2001 whilst competing at an enthusiasts' meeting, but walked away unhurt. The conversion was undertaken by Aston Martin Works Service with a total rebuild cost of around £220,000. The Tadek Marek 5.3 V8 engine was reworked to produce an estimated 482 bhp (359 kW; 489 PS), carrying the unique designation 580XR. The car retired from racing in 2007 and Atkinson sold it in 2008 for £122,500.
