= Aston Martin DB4 GT Zagato =

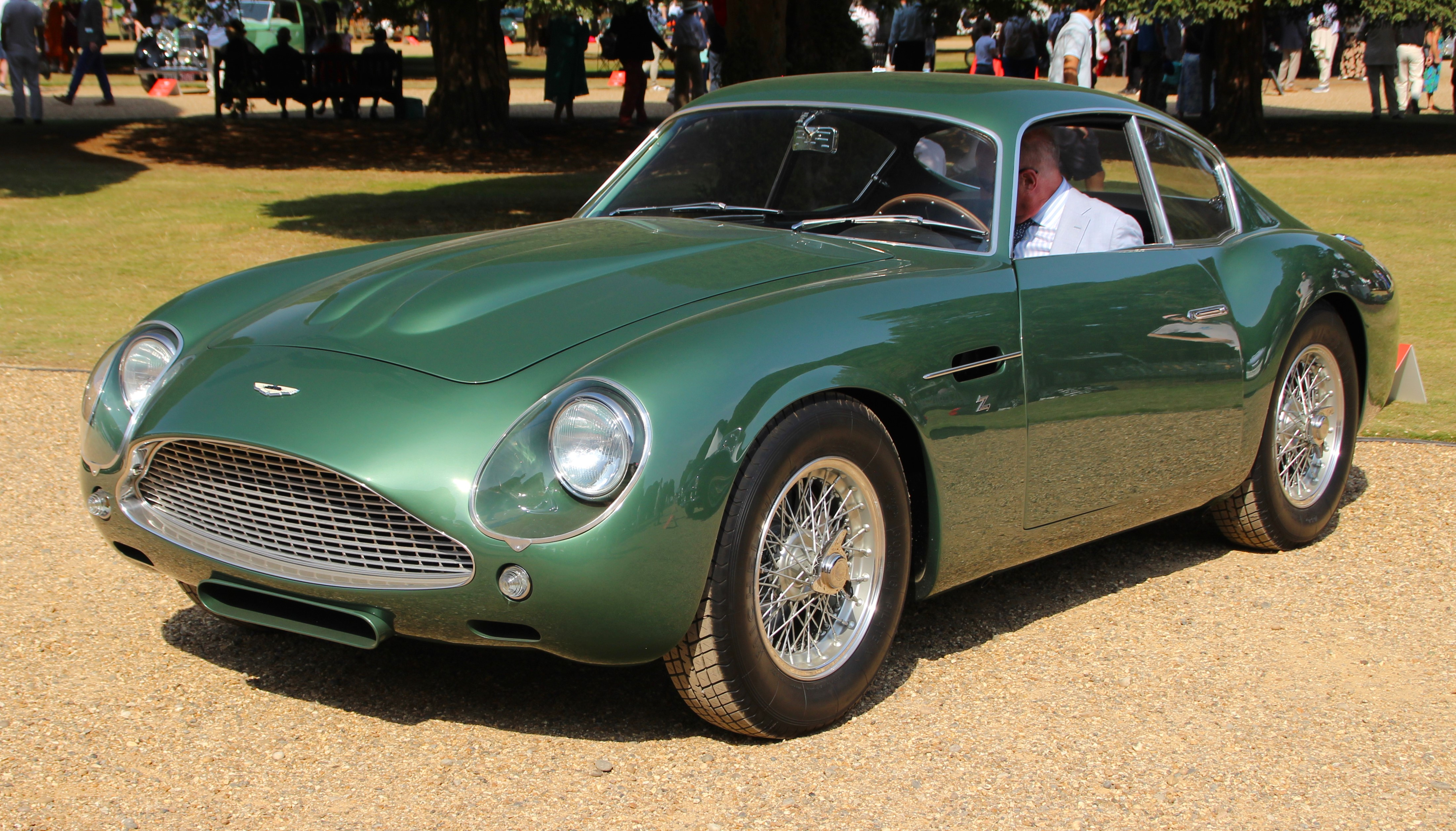

Overview
- Manufacturer: Aston Martin
- Production: 1960–1963; (25 produced, inc 4 Sanction II and 2 Sanction III)
- Designer: Ercole Spada at Zagato

Body and chassis
- Class: Grand tourer
- Body style: 2-door coupé
- Related: Aston Martin DB4

Powertrain
- Engine: 3670 cc Marek DOHC I6
- Transmission: 4-speed manual

Dimensions
- Wheelbase: 2,362 mm (93.0 in)
- Length: 4,267 mm (168.0 in)
- Width: 1,557 mm (61.3 in)
- Height: 1,270 mm (50.0 in)
- Kerb weight: 1,225 kg (2,701 lb)

Chronology
- Successor: Aston Martin V8 Zagato

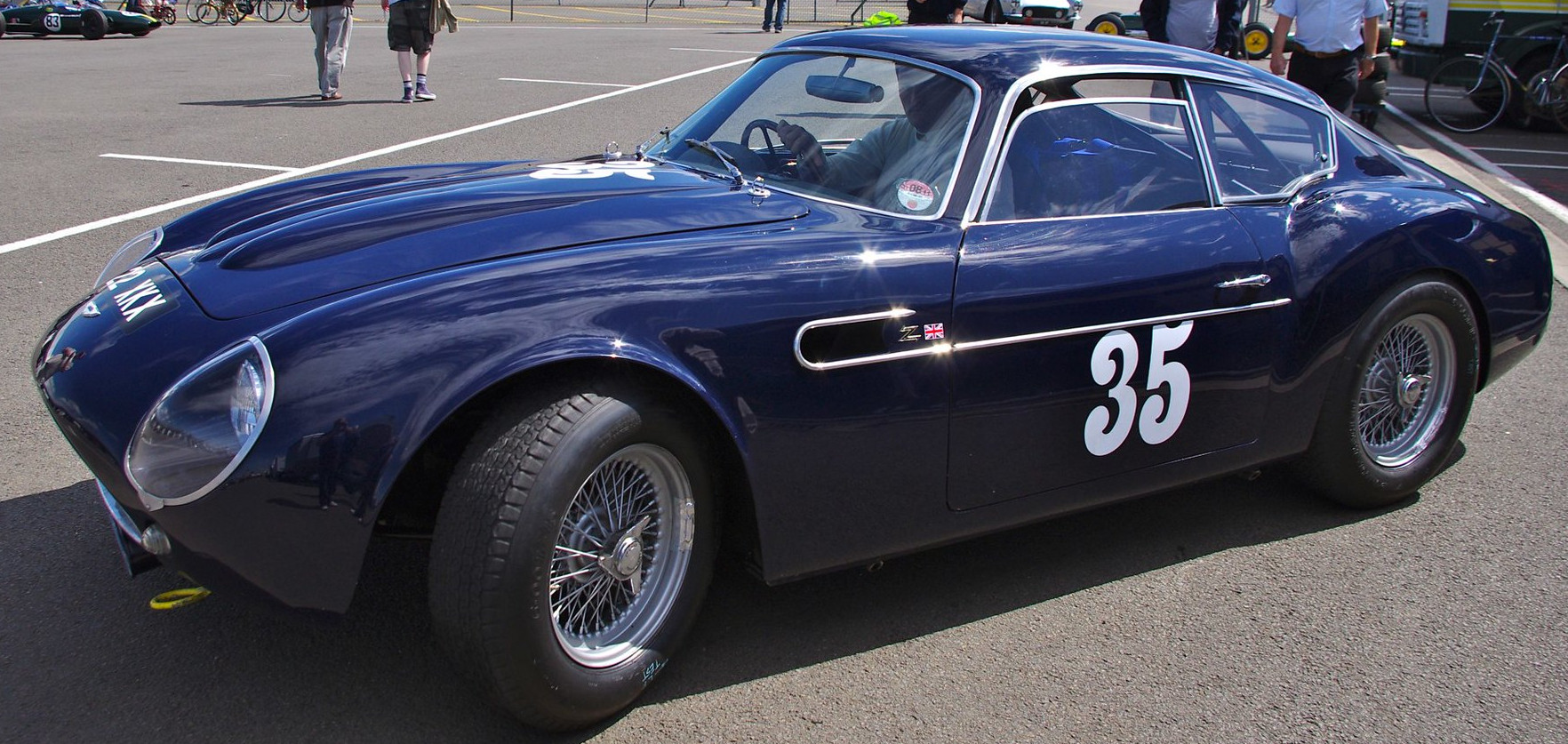
0200/R was the first, displayed at Earls Court in 1960 and raced by Mike Salmon at 1962 24 Hours of Le Mans, here at Silverstone Classic in 2011.

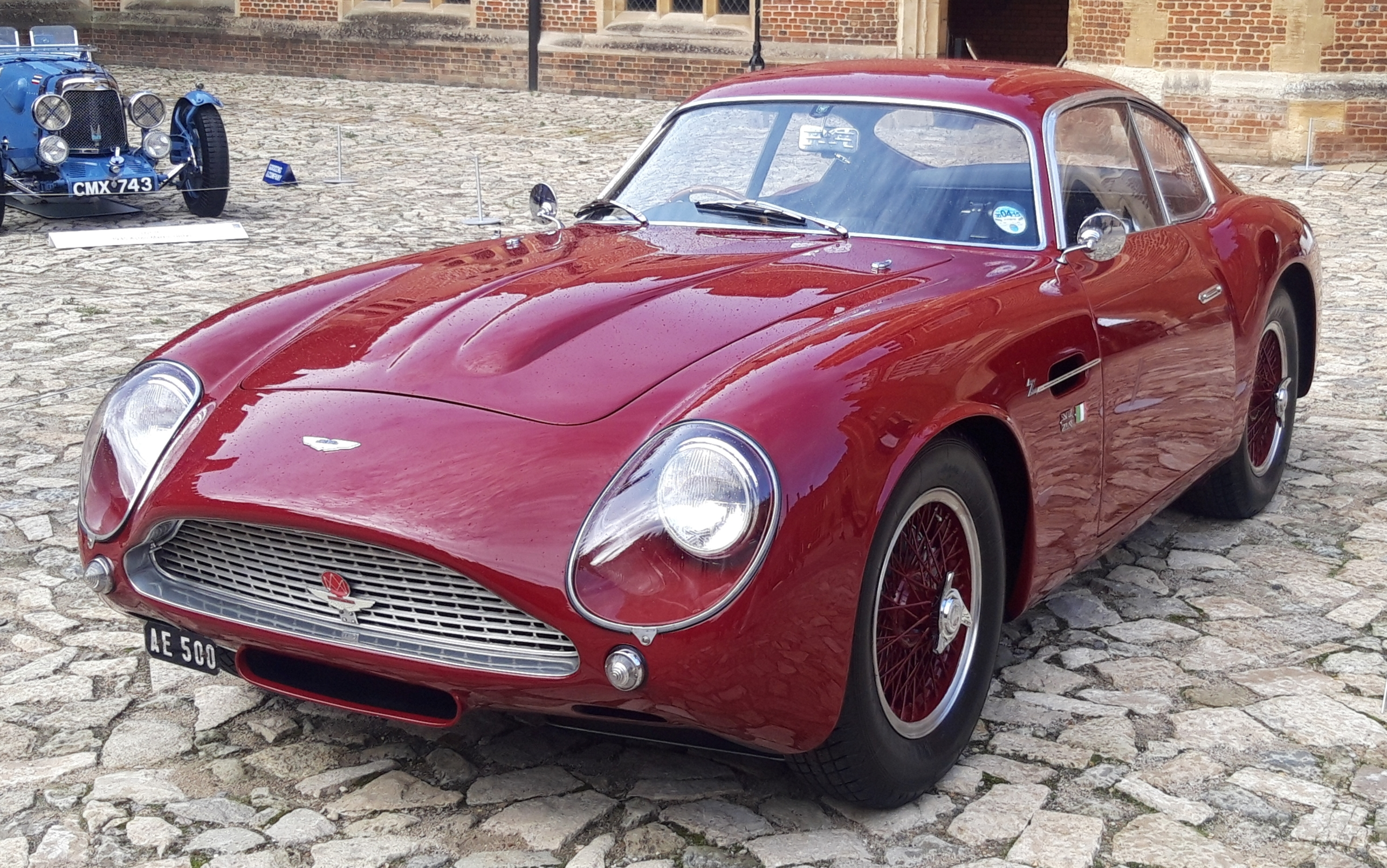
0176/R has its original Italian red racing color and may be the most original as of 2023.

The Aston Martin DB4 GT Zagato is a grand tourer sports car designed by Zagato and produced between 1960 and 1963. Introduced in October 1960 at the London Motor Show, it was effectively a DB4 GT, lightened and improved by the Zagato factory in Italy, by Ercole Spada. Initially, the factory planned to produce 25 cars, but demand was not as strong as expected and production was reduced to 19.

Growing popularity of the original DB4 GT Zagato resulted in two subsequent waves of cars based on DB4s being rendered into "Zagatos" through the cooperation of Aston Martin and the Zagato works in Italy. They are known as "Sanction II" and "Sanction III" cars. Also, an unauthorised industry of modifying original DB4 GTs into "Zagato" replicas has arisen.

== Specification ==
=== Engine ===
Although the specification of the engine was changed and upgraded throughout their racing history, the Aston Martin DB4 GT Zagato predominantly featured a 3.7-litre aluminium twin-spark straight 6-cylinder engine with a 9.7:1 compression ratio, higher than the DB4 GT engine.

The engine produced 314 hp (234 kW), and had a 0 to 60 mph (97 km/h) acceleration of 6.1 seconds and a top speed of approximately 154 mph (248 km/h).

=== Body ===
Ercole Spada at Zagato transformed the DB4 GT into a smaller, more aerodynamic, super-lightweight car. Many steel components were replaced with the more lightweight and heat-resistant aluminium components. All non-essential elements disappeared, such as the bumpers. With the help of Perspex and aluminium components, about 150 pounds (68 kg) was shed from the DB4 GT.

== Racing history ==
Four of the original Aston Martin DB4 GT Zagato's chassis, No.s 0191, 0193, 0182 (1 VEV) and 0183 (2 VEV), were built to a lightened DP207/209 specification especially for racing. The DP209 cars have a lower roofline, larger rear wings, a reshaped tail and a flatter, longer front end.

The first major race using an Aston Martin DB4 GT Zagato was around Easter in 1961 at Goodwood. Driven by Stirling Moss, the car finished 3rd, behind an Aston Martin DB4 GT and the winning Ferrari 250 GT.

The most prominent DB4 GT Zagatos, affectionately known by the registration plates they share, 1 VEV and 2 VEV, were both raced under John Ogier's Essex Racing Stable, with assistance from the Aston Martin factory. Both the Zagatos raced in the 1961 24 Hours of Le Mans. However a repeat of the 1959 Le Mans victory was not to be, with both cars retiring. In July 1961 at a British Grand Prix Support race, the Zagato had its first victory with 2 VEV taking the last lap lead from a Jaguar E Type.

2 VEV crashed into a spa in 1962 and was rebuilt to the lightweight DP209 specification. After a car accident in 1993, the car was returned to the 1962 specification.

Chassis 0200 raced in the 1962 24 Hours of Le Mans; however, a blown piston after 9 1/2 hours forced the car to retire.

== Gallery ==
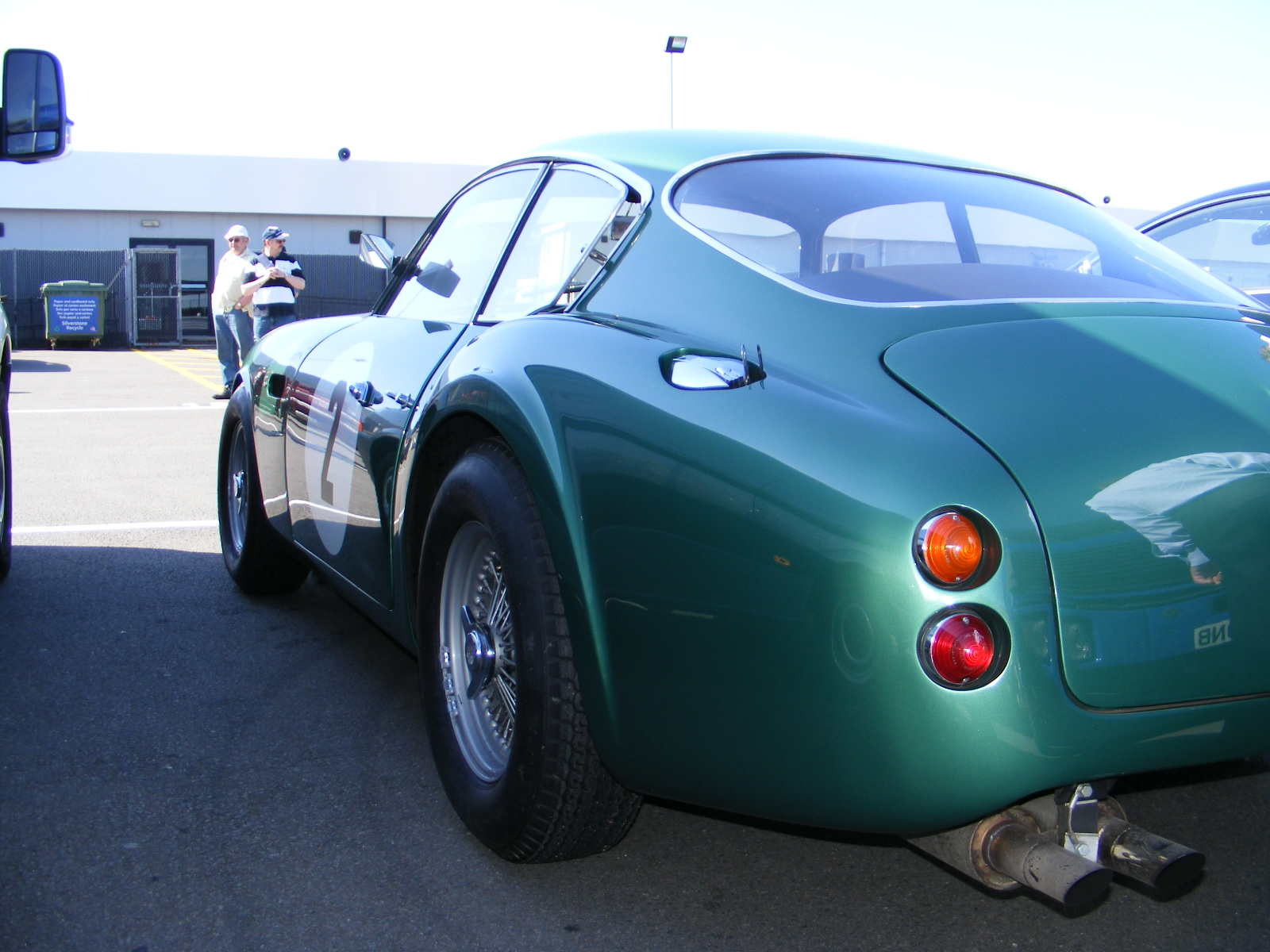
Side view of DB4GT Zagato, 1 VEV

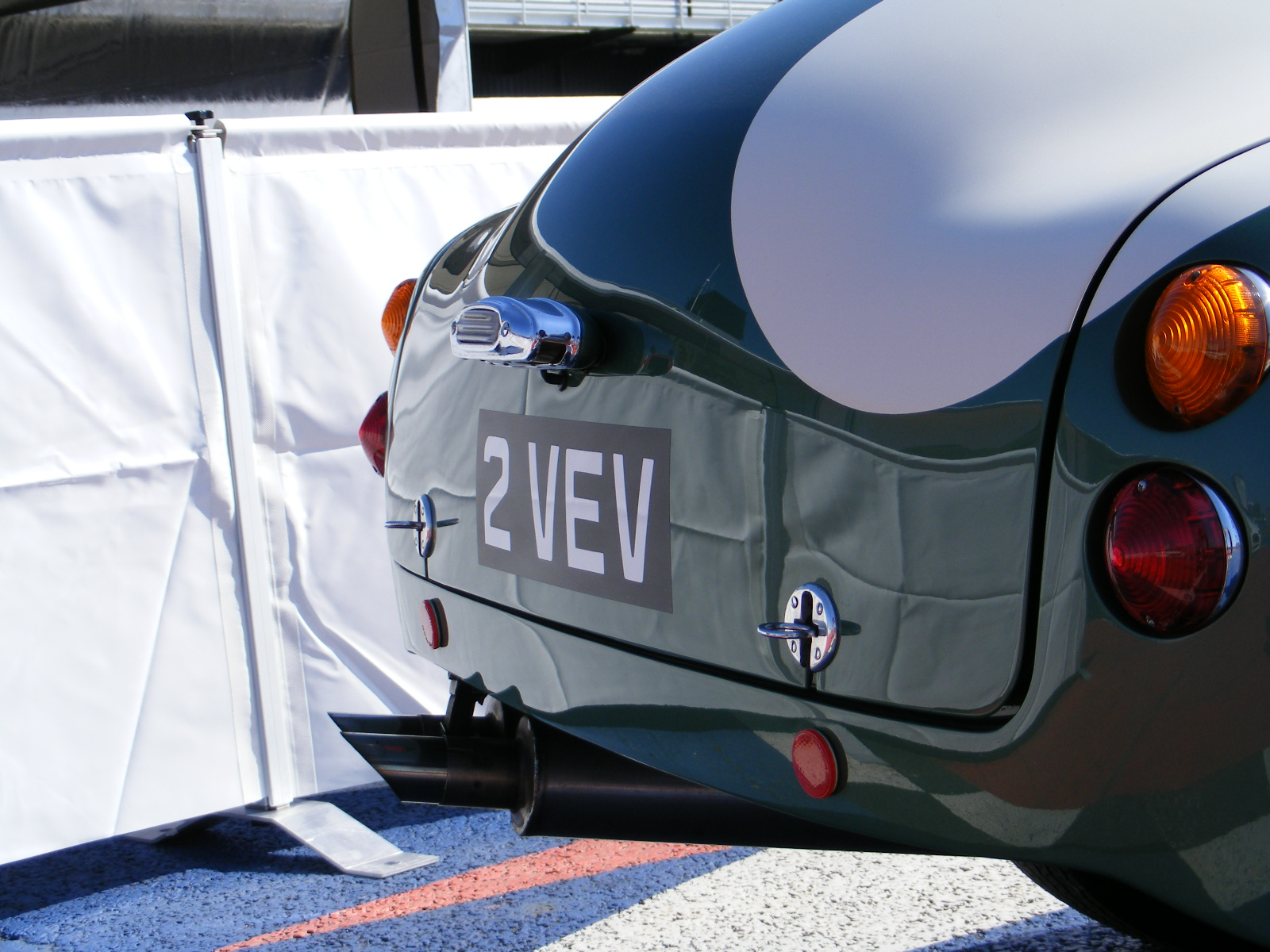
Rear view of DB4GT Zagato, 2 VEV

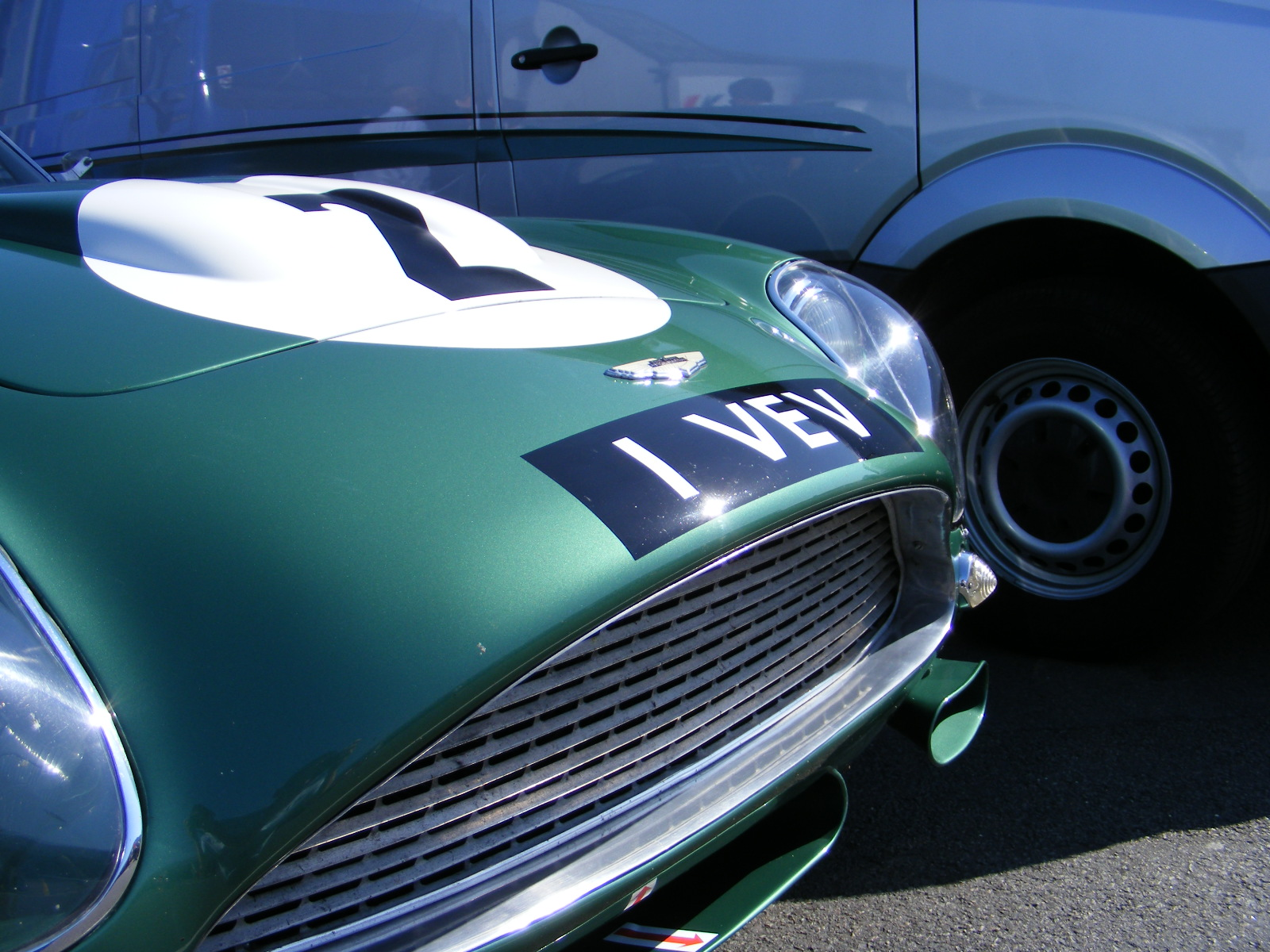
Front View of Aston Martin DB4GT Zagato, 1 VEV

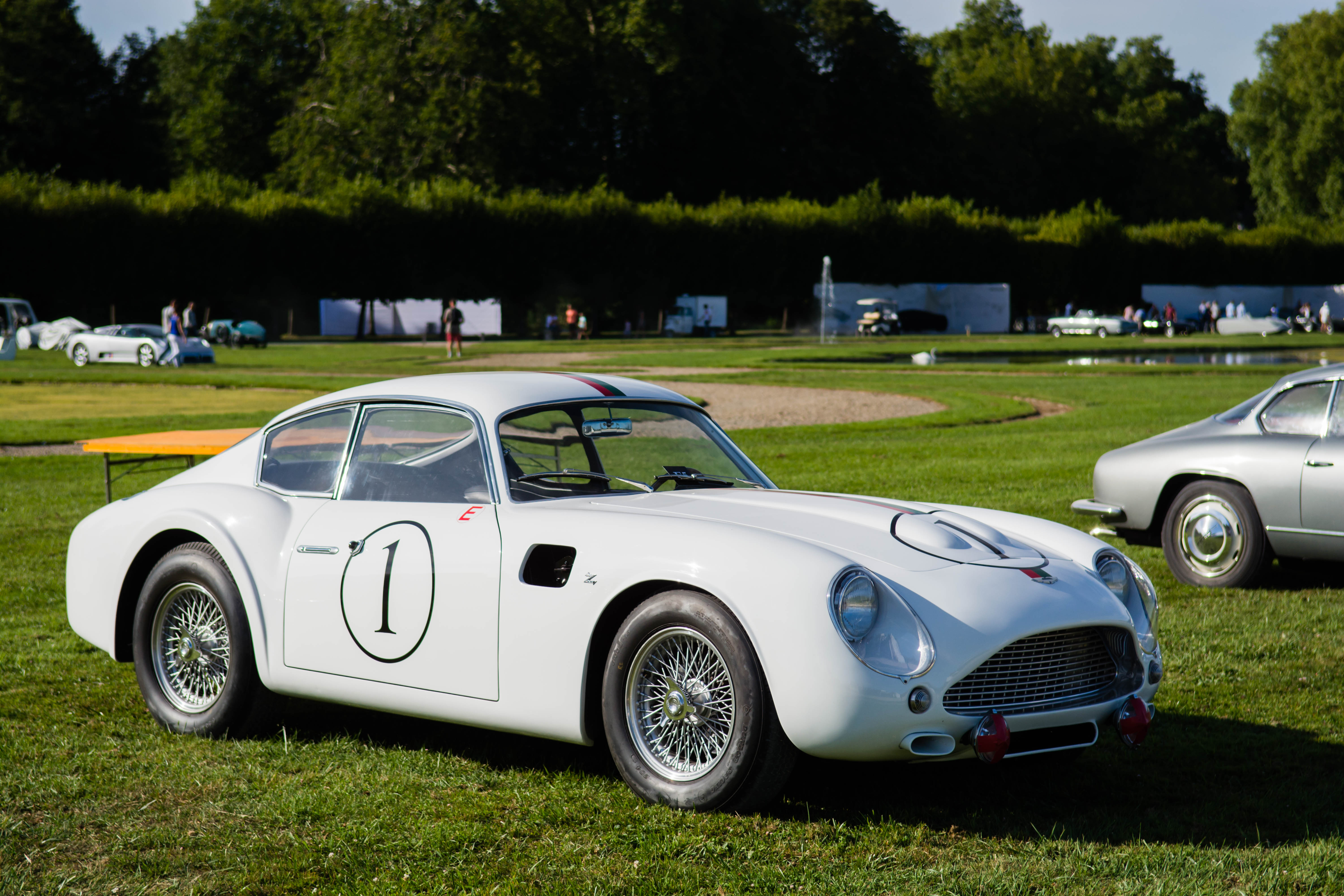

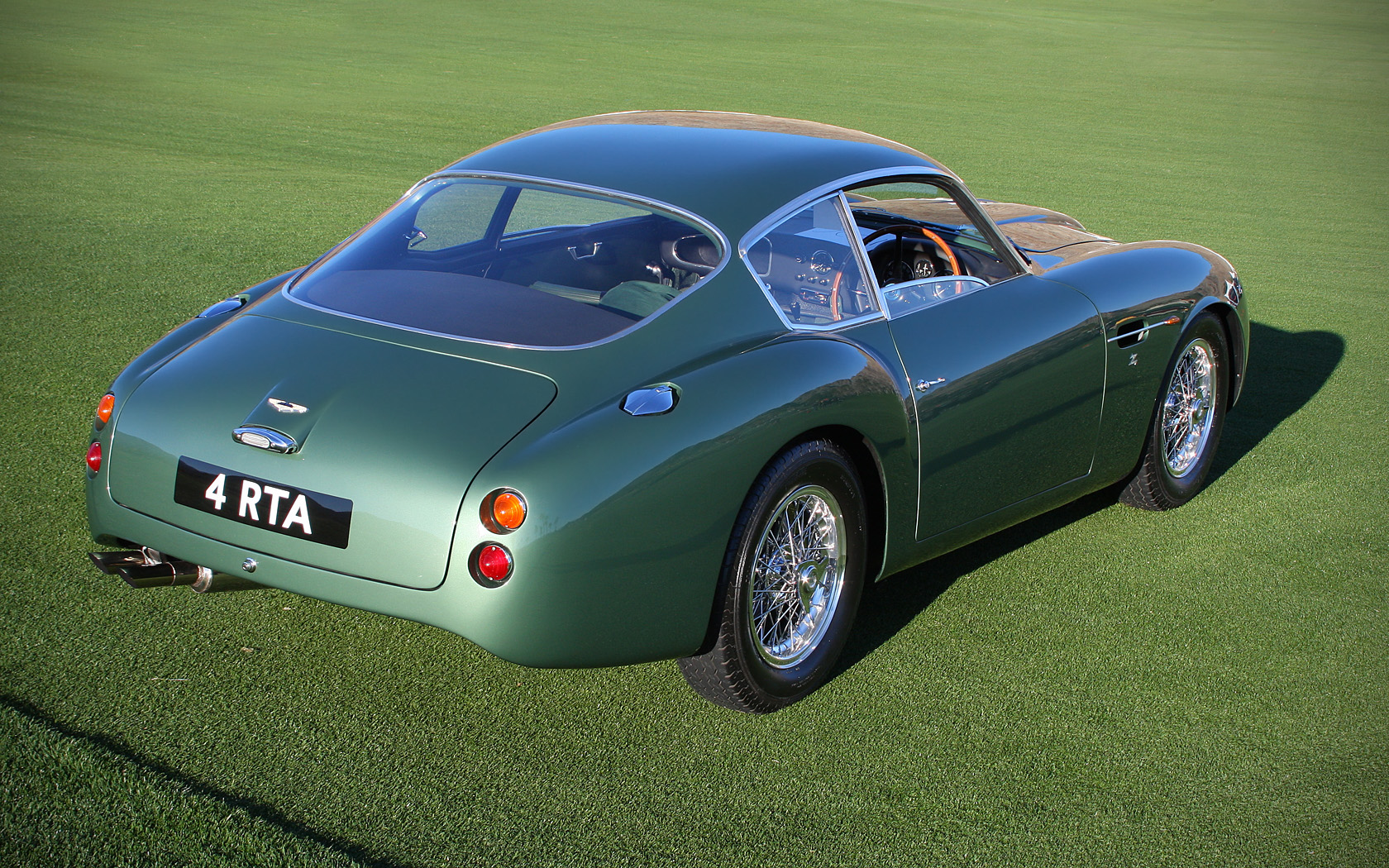
1961 Aston Martin DB4GT Zagato (rear)

== Sanction II Zagatos ==
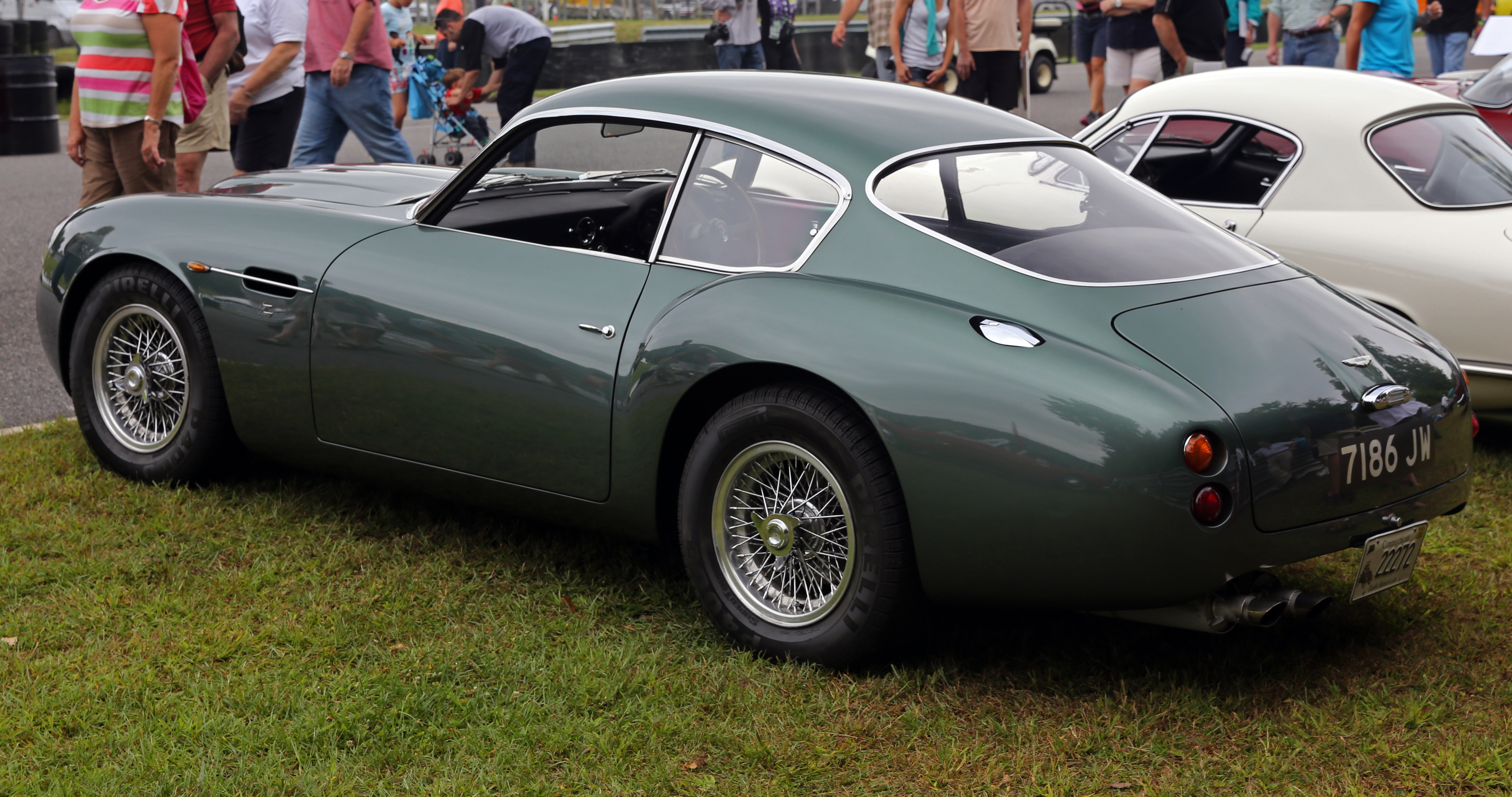
1988 Sanction II chassis 0196/R at Lime Rock in Connecticut, 2014

In 1988, four unutilised chassis numbers were put to use. With the approval of Aston Martin, four DB4 chassis were appropriately uprated to GT specifications. These chassis were then sent to Zagato's Milan workshop to be bodied like the originals, with a smaller oval grille, without the stock DB4 GT's rear tail fins, and with a smoothed out rear end. To familiarise the workforce with construction techniques of the 1960s, an original DB4 GT Zagato was sent there to be dismantled. These "Works-Approved Replicas" were known as the "Sanction II" cars. They were outwardly identical, but several changes were effected in the interest of better handling. Each of these cars sold for over $1,000,000. Differences from the "originals" include a larger engine capacity, increased from 3.7 to 4.2 litres, and a smaller wheel diameter, reduced from 16 inches to 15. The first of the four GT-specification rolling chassis was delivered to Zagato in January 1989 and the fourth in April of the same year, with all four being completed in July 1991. All four cars were then given their own chassis numbers, fitting for the 1960s.

=== Comparison of Sanction I to Sanction II ===
	1961 DB4GT Zagato	1988 DB4GT Zagato Sanction II
Chassis	Platform based on DB4GT	Platform based on DB4GT/0181/L
Wheelbase	7 ft 9 in (2,360 mm)	7 ft 9 in (2,360 mm)
Overall Length	14 ft 0 in (4,270 mm)	13 ft 10.5 in (4,229 mm)
Width	5 ft 5.25 in (1,657.3 mm)	5 ft 6 in (1,680 mm)
Height	4 ft 2 in (1,270 mm)	4 ft 2 in (1,270 mm)
Weight	24.6 long cwt (2,760 lb; 1,250 kg)	24.75 long cwt (2,772 lb; 1,257 kg)
Steering	Rack and pinion	Rack and pinion
Front Suspension	IFS. wishbones, coil springs and telescopic dampers Anti-roll bar	As in 1961 car, but adjustable and thicker anti-roll bar
Rear Suspension	Live axle on coil springs, located by trailing arms and Watt linkage	As in 1961 car, but improved positioning, adjustable
Brakes	Girling discs all round; no servo; separate master cylinders	Discs all round; no servo; smaller rear calipers; altered brake balance; dual circuit
Wheels	Borrani wire spoked with light alloy rims, 16-inch diameter, 5 inches wide	Borrani wire spoked with light alloy rims, 15-inch diameter, 6 inches wide
Tyres	6.00 x 16 Avon Turbospeed Mark II	205/70 15 Goodyear Eagle NCT
Gearbox	David Brown 4-speed manual, all-synchromesh	David Brown 4-speed manual, all-synchromesh
Final Drive	Hypoid bevel 3.31:1 Powr-lok limited-slip differential (LSD)	Hypoid bevel 3.07:1 limited-slip differential (LSD)
Engine	All-alloy straight six Dual overhead camshaft (DOHC), two plugs per cylinder	All alloy straight six Dual overhead camshaft (DOHC), two plugs per cylinder
Capacity	3,670 cc	4,212 cc
Compression	9.7 to 1	9.82 to 1
Carburetors	Three Weber 45 DCOE4	Three Weber 50 DC01/SP
Max. power	314 bhp (234 kW; 318 PS) at 6,000 rpm	352 bhp (262 kW; 357 PS) at 6,000 rpm
Max. Torque	278 lb⋅ft (377 N⋅m) at 5,400 rpm	330 lb⋅ft (447 N⋅m) at 4,600 rpm
0-60 mph (97 km/h)	6.1 seconds	5.5 seconds
0-100 mph (160 km/h)	14.1 seconds	12.2 seconds
Max. Speed	153.5 mph (247.0 km/h)	153.0 mph (246.2 km/h)
Production Numbers	19	4
Chassis Numbers	0176–0191, 0193, 0199, 0200	0192, 0196, 0197, 0198
Price when new	£5,470 (enough to buy a sizeable house at the time)	In excess of $1,000,000

Rolls-Royce Phantom in 1961 cost £7,000, in 1988 – $300,000.

== Sanction III Zagatos ==
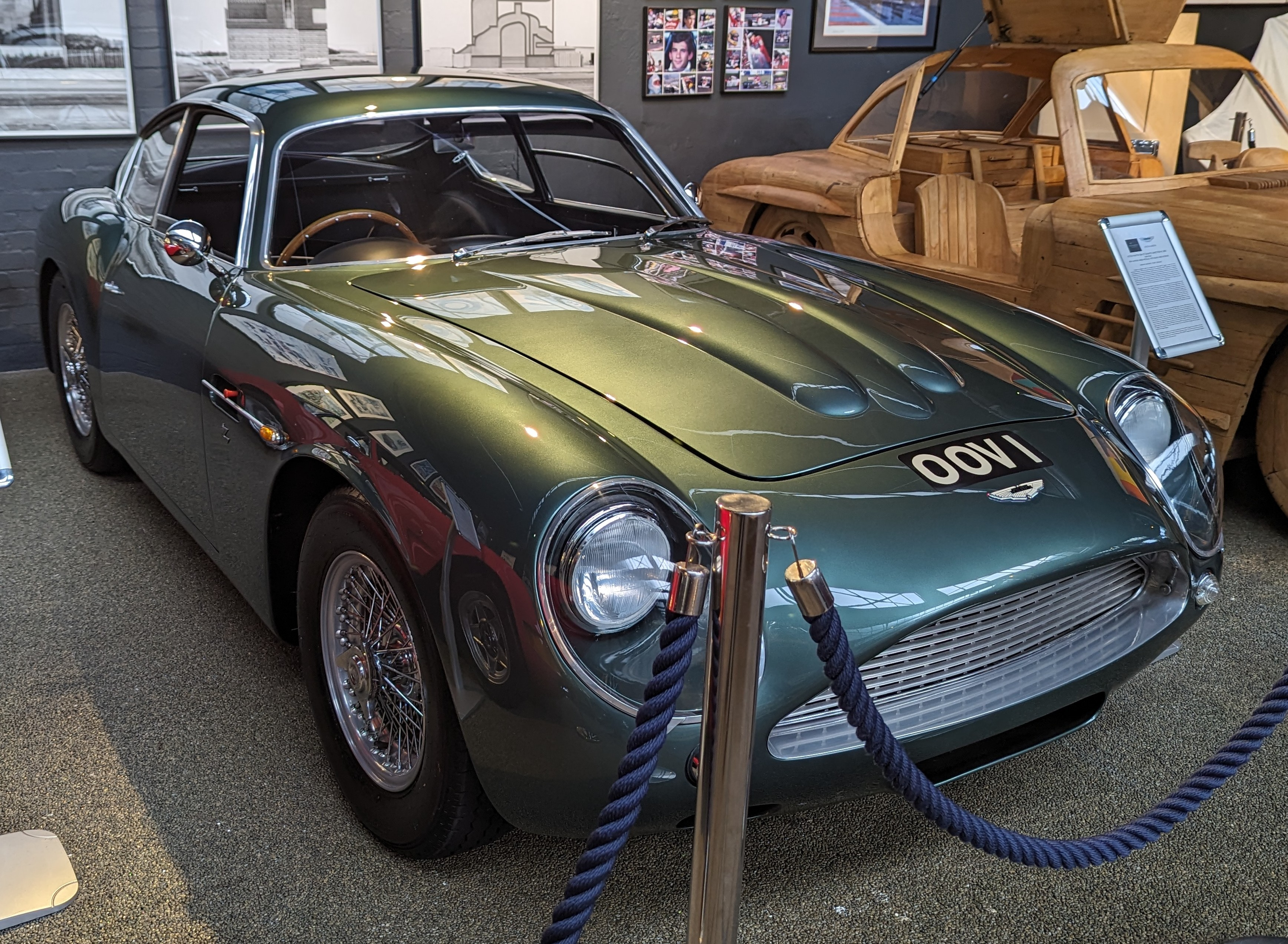
2000 model "Sanction III" chassis DB4/344/R on display in London, 2023.

The Zagato factory still had two spare body shells left over after producing the Sanction II Zagatos. In 1992, Richard Williams approached the executive chairman of Aston Martin Lagonda Ltd, Walter Hayes, and sought approval for the spare body shells to be used to create two further "Sanction" cars. Walter Hayes gave his approval and the body shells along with two neglected Aston Martin DB4s (chassis No.s DB4/344/R and DB4/424/R) were completed to form a pair of Aston Martin DB4 GT Zagato "Sanction IIIs" in the year 2000.

== Aston Martin Continuation Series ==
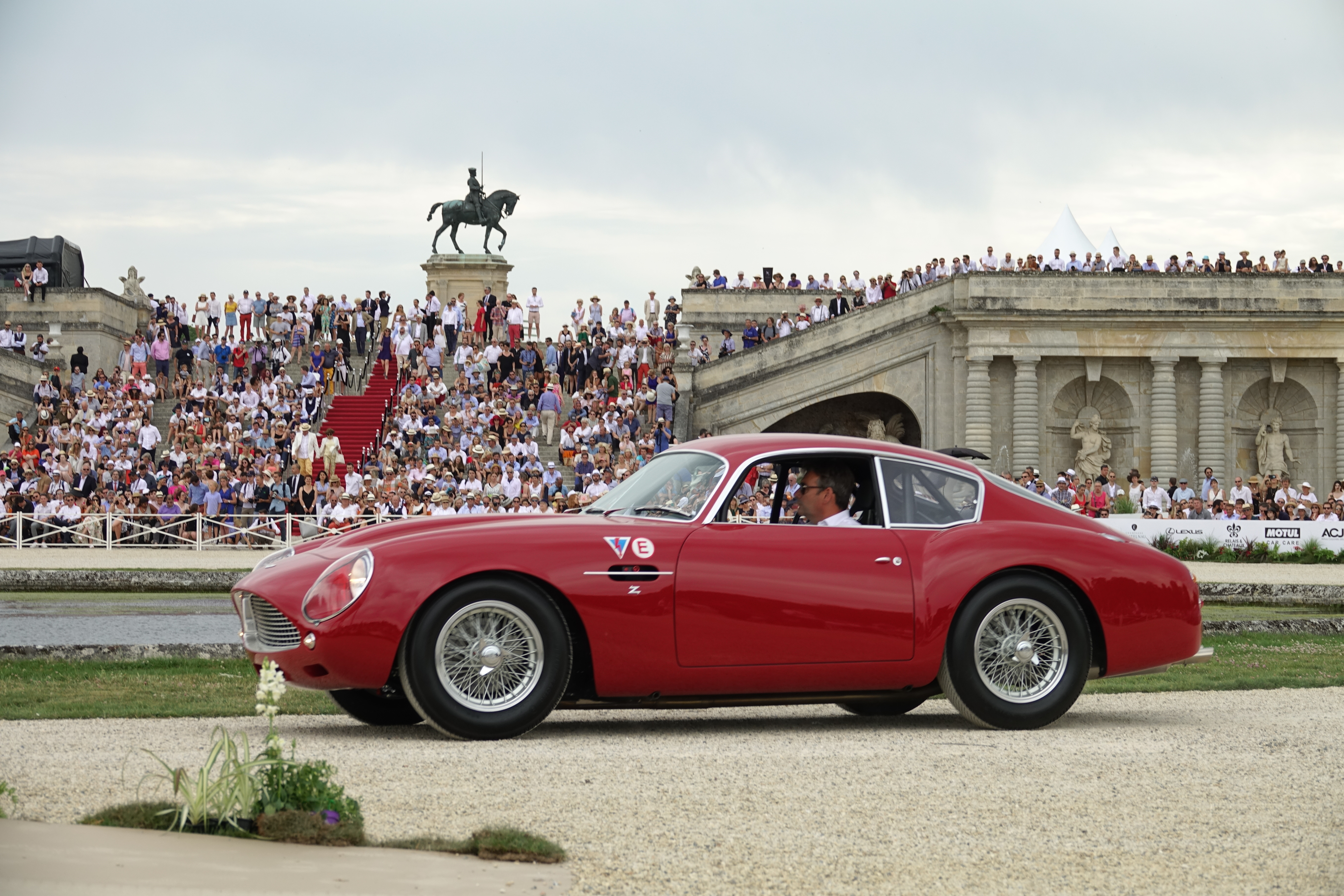
2019 Continuation at Château de Chantilly in 2019.

In April 2019, Aston Martin Works (the heritage division of Aston Martin) started building a run of 19 DB4 GT Zagatos. The cars can only be purchased as part of the "DBZ Centenary Collection" pack which also includes an Aston Martin DBS GT Zagato. Instead of the original 3.7-litre straight-six, the recreations from Aston Martin Works use a 4.7-litre engine now making around 400 bhp. Aston Martin Works manufactured Continuation Series which captures the essence of Aston Martin's illustrious heritage.

== Replicas ==
Various replica cars have been constructed based on DB4 and DB4 GT chassis. These replica (or recreation) cars bear a resemblance to the original Zagatos, but were not made by Zagato.
