= Aston Martin Vantage =

- 1972 Aston Martin Vantage

Overview
- Manufacturer: Aston Martin
- Production: 1972–1973; 71 produced
- Assembly: United Kingdom: Newport Pagnell, Buckinghamshire, England
- Designer: William Towns

Body and chassis
- Class: Grand tourer
- Body style: 2-door coupé
- Layout: FR layout
- Related: Aston Martin V8

Powertrain
- Engine: 4.0 L Tadek Marek I6

Chronology
- Predecessor: Aston Martin DBS

Aston Martin has used the Vantage name on a number of vehicles, normally indicating a high-performance version of another model. In one case, from 1972–1973, the Vantage was a distinct model, being a straight-6 powered version of the DBS, a car that had been launched as a straight-6 but was by that time V8-powered (as the DBS V8). Despite the Vantage nameplate, the 1972–1973 Vantage was in reality the least powerful model in the manufacturer's range at the time. It was also the least expensive, serving as an entry-level Aston Martin.

Visual cues include a unique 2-headlight front clip with DB6-like grille. It was also the last Aston Martin to come equipped with wire wheels. Only 71 examples were built.

The Vantage was the last straight-6 Aston Martin until the 1993 DB7.
