= Aston Martin RHAM/1 =

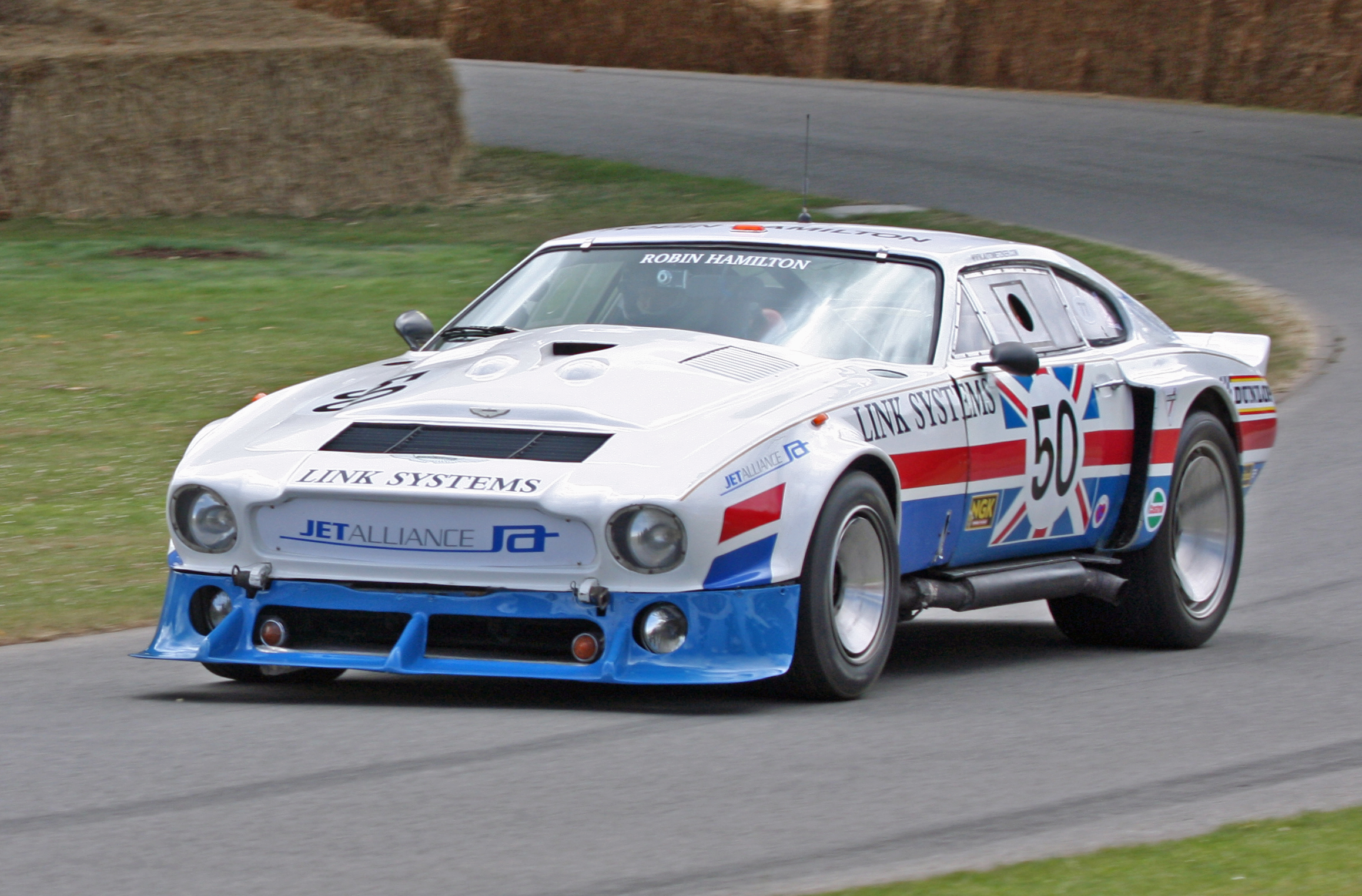
- Aston Martin DBS V8, RHAM/1 at Goodwood Festival of Speed 2009
- Category: Le Mans Racer, Sports car racing
- Constructor: Robin Hamilton, Aston Martin Lagonda LTD
- Designer: Robin Hamilton

Technical specifications
- Chassis: Highly modified Aston Martin DBS V8 (DBSV8/10038/RC); Fibre glass panels, lowered roof and front bonnet line
- Suspension (front): Unequal wishbones, front anti-roll bar
- Suspension (rear): Reduced width De Dion tube, radius arms, trailing links, Koni dampers, custom coil springs, nylon mountings
- Length: 15 ft 4.5 in (4,580 mm)
- Width: 6 ft 4 in (1,930 mm)
- Height: 4 ft 0.25 in (1,230 mm)
- Wheelbase: 8 ft 06 in (2,610 mm)
- Engine: RH developed Aston Martin 5,340 cc Alloy V8, Twin-OHC per bank, Twin Garrett AiResearch turbos, Bosch fuel injection (1979) FR Layout; 1977: 188 mph (303 km/h), 492 bhp (367 kW) @ 6,500 rpm (Max 510 bhp @7000 rpm); 1979: 190 mph (310 km/h), 600 bhp @ 6,000 rpm (Max 800 bhp @ 7,000 rpm)
- Transmission: Custom built ZF 5-speed Manual; Close-ratio 5th gear AP 3-plate clutch (77), 4-plate (79) Modified LSD
- Weight: 1977: 1516 kg (54%-46%, F-R); 1979: 1,486 kg
- Tyres: Custom made Dunlop

Competition history
- Notable entrants: (United Kingdom) SAS Robin Hamilton (United Kingdom) Robin Hamilton (United Kingdom) Ault & Wiborg Ltd
- Notable drivers: (United Kingdom) Mike Salmon (United Kingdom) Robin Hamilton (United Kingdom) David Preece (United Kingdom) Derek Bell
- Debut: 1977 24 Hours of Le Mans

The Aston Martin RHAM/1 was a racing car developed by Robin Hamilton, built with the intention of racing at the 24 Hours of Le Mans. After development by Hamilton, RHAM/1 competed in the 1977 and 1979 24 Hours of Le Mans, finishing 17th overall and 3rd in the GTP class in the 1977 race. The car has also held the World Land Speed Record, for towing a caravan, at the speed of 124.91 mph.

== Design ==
After completing his apprenticeship with Rolls-Royce in Derby, Robin Hamilton set up Robin Hamilton Motors in Tutbry with David Jack. At Robin Hamilton Motors they specialised solely in Aston Martins. Hamilton gained large experience with Aston Martin DBS V8's and AM V8's while at the specialist. Hamilton's DBS V8 (DBSV8/10038/RC) was only the second ever production Aston Martin V8 to take to the track. Competing on 6 April 1974, with the first raced V8 being a DBS V8 in 1970 at the AMOC Curborough Sprint.

With Hamilton's experience, the DBS V8/10038/RC was developed. After large modifications to the car over the three years of 1974 to 1977, the car became unrecognisable and its designation was changed to RHAM/1 (Robin Hamilton Aston Martin #1). Whilst this is not a works car, support was provided by the Aston Martin factory, and indeed lessons learned from the MIRA wind tunnel test sessions were applied to the V8 Vantage in the form of front air dam and rear spoiler.

== Racing history ==
=== 1974 ===
In 1974, Staffordshire based Aston Martin specialist, Robin Hamilton began competing a lightly modified 1969 DBS V8 (DBS/10038/RC) in Aston Martin Owners Club events. The first major alterations that were made to 10038/RC were made to make the car conform to Group 4 regulations and bring the car into line with the then current production AM V8 by fitting the latter's single headlight AM V8 front end.

To make the Le Mans dreams possible the Aston Martin V8 was homologated for racing, which involved registering the car with both the RAC MSA (now MSA) and the FIA.

=== 1975 ===
Due to the large modifications to the aerodynamics of the car, DBSV8/10038/RC was not usable on the roads. At this stage the car was far quicker than any standard DBS V8, however only shared similar power outputs to the production V8 Vantage.

With Le Mans the eventual target, the car was further developed to incorporate modified cylinder heads, revised camshafts, side-draft Weber carburettors and a race exhaust system, while the suspension and brakes were also upgraded, with stiffer and shorter springs, larger brakes, wider wheels and racing slick tyres. In this form DBSV8/10038/RC raced in AMOC events throughout 1975, competing up until September 1975. The car showed promise, proving to be a match for former Le Mans cars at the AMOC Silverstone meeting in July by finishing 3rd. Later that year, the car gained a quartet of dragster-style downdraft Weber carburettors, which were the height of half the windscreen for the 1976 season.

=== 1976 ===
The DBS V8 appeared at the Jaguar Drivers Club meeting in April 1976 as after it had undergone wind tunnel testing at MIRA (through backing from Aston Martin). The car's power output had not been tested on a dynamometer, nor a rolling road, with the only testing being held on a straight stretch of 3 miles (4.8 km) of local public road.

The car only completed half of the events in 1976 due to the preparation for the scheduled Le Mans appearance. Robin Hamilton hoped to race at the 1976 Le Mans race, even preparing a sponsorship brochure, seeking financial support. With the brochure saying: "The Aston Martin will run in Group 4, and although it is unlikely to finish 1st overall, stands an excellent chance of winning this Group, which would carry almost as much prestige as winning the race overall." In the personnel list, famous Aston Martin team manager John Wyer was listed as project consultant and Willie Green as second driver, with the third driver to be announced.

Fred Hartley, an interim managing director at Aston Martin in 1976, had promised assistance to Hamilton, via a letter to him. But neither this financial assistance, nor a sponsor was found and the car did not go to the 1976 Le Mans race but this was probably a good omen, as according to Hamilton, "Actually it was just as well, because I don't think we would have been ready for it."

In November/December 1976, Hamilton was allowed 2 weeks of testing on the engine test-bed facilities at Aston Martin's Newport Pagnell factory . With liaison from Dave Morgan (experienced with Lola-Astons of the 1960s and later the Aston Martin Nimrod V8's), there was small development with the engine and "suggestions about carburettors and bell-mouths."

Robin Hamilton went back to the Aston Martin Factory for financial backing (£20,000) for the project, suggesting an idea, for production of a powerful 380-400 bhp (300 kW) limited edition Aston Martin V8. His idea being to increase the sale price by £1000, this £1000 funding his project. Aston Martin dismissed the idea, even though Hamilton had made drawings of the proposed car. In 1977 Aston Martin went on to introduce the V8 Vantage, similar to Hamiltons idea, but only coincidental.

Robin Hamilton got assistance from Mike Loasby, who paid for a wind tunnel test session, in which they made the spoiler and other pieces to make the Vantage. The car saw a 10% reduction in drag and increased downforce bodywork. The car now almost had the same body shape as the Vantage. All efforts were then put into making the 1976 24 Hours of Le Mans and a sponsor would eventually be found.

=== 1977 ===
Robin Hamilton again released a sponsorship brochure for 1977, but again failed to get any large sponsorship backing. But Hamilton did gain a small sponsorship deal from SAS in London, a company who specialised in riot and security equipment. Hamilton received £25,000, which covered most of his costs for Le Mans. The V8 engine had now been fitted with Nimonic steel valves, special forged Cosworth pistons and a redesigned sump. The engine would now produce 520 bhp (390 kW) at 6,750 rpm and 381 bhp at the wheels. Plus over 400 ft·lbf of torque at 5,250 rpm with Weber 50 IDA downdraught carburettors. The car by this stage was now a Group 5 car rather than a Group 4, which would mean it would have to race against the turbocharged Porsches. Another wind tunnel test showed that the car would have dangerous amounts of lift on the Mulsanne Straight, so another change had to be made, and a rear tail spoiler needed to be fitted. The wind tunnel test also showed that the radiator, (now moved to the back to change the weight bias), would gain then 10 mph more in top speed, but it would cause the engine to run too hot, so it had to be moved back to its original location. Four oil coolers also ensured that the engine temperature never exceeded 110 °C.

The car also had other modifications made to it, with a redesign of the front bulkhead and mostly drilled box section included in the chassis modifications. RHAM/1 also had roller bearing drive shafts and peg-drive centre lock hubs for the one piece custom made BBS magnesium wheels. The wheels measured 19" in diameter, 15" wide at the rear, and 13" wide at the front and had special, custom made Dunlop tyres for them. The wheels themselves needed to be bigger than 16" to go over the twin caliper, 12½" Lockheed, ventilated disc brakes, with no servo assistance. All of which was needed to stop the 30 cwt Aston Martin. The alternator was switched to run off the gearbox (which itself had a closer ratio 5th gear) instead of the engine crankshaft. The clutch was now uprated to a triple plate. The suspension was almost standard, with standard rubber bushes but with slight geometry changes. Nylon mountings were also used for a reduced width Dion tube. The roll cage was a NASCAR (instead of FIA) specification cage, which was bolted to the chassis. This alone weighed 50 kg.

The car by then became known as RHAM/1 (its chassis number, Robin Hamilton Aston Martin #1) as it was unrecognisable from the original car. RHAM/1 made its debut at the Silverstone Six Hours a pre event to the Le Mans race, on 15 May 1977. By this time Hamilton had gained some financial input from several AMOC members, whose names appeared on the rear wing for the race. At the Six Hour race, Hamilton drove alongside fellow AMOC member David Preece. In practice Preece spun off, but not a lot of damage was caused to the car. RHAM/1 qualified on the eight row, in 1 minute 43.39 seconds. During the race, Le Mans gearing ratios and a rev limiter of 6,000 rpm meant the car lost over 100 bhp. At a pit stop, heat soak from the in board rear brakes caused the differential oil seal to fail and 55 minutes were lost in the stop. Due to the regulations saying that they could not change the unit, they had to repair it. In order to save more complications, and to finish the race, the car raced on at a much slower pace. Hamilton and Preece did finish, but they failed to reach the final standings due to insufficient laps completed.

After the race, Hamilton had to modify the cooling of the rear brakes, otherwise the car would never last the 24-hour period.

RHAM/1 competed in its first 24 Hour event when it raced at the 1977 Le Mans 24 hour race. With drivers David Preece, Mike Salmon (a Le Mans veteran, Salmon had driven the last Aston to race at the Sarthe, Peter Sutcliffe's Aston Martin DP214, in 1964.) and Robin Hamilton himself. A request was made to move to the GTP category (from the competitive Group 5, where opposition was deemed less strong. This request was granted by the organisers.

The first practice was a wet session, and all drivers came accustomed to the wet conditions. With RHAM/1 putting in respectable lap times, being assisted by good tyre grip with the aid of huge 1516 kg weight of the car (heaviest by 5½ cwt). The fastest time would have put them in the middle of the grid. In the next practice session the car ran with both radiator ducts open, which aided cooling down to 85 °C, but gave the effect which was likened to losing a cylinder on the Mulsanne Straight, due to the increased drag. In the last hours of qualifying, Hamilton had to put in quick laps in the dark, in order to make the cut for the race. Hamilton put in a best time of 4 minutes 31.8 seconds, With the V8 engine producing 520 bhp, RHAM/1 was recorded at 188 mph on the Mulsanne Straight during qualifying. Hamiltons time was well inside the 4 minutes 48 seconds maximum time, however this was the slowest in the GTP class. The organisers for the race, then decided to reduce the field to 55 cars, which meant losing the slowest car in each class, which would have meant RHAM/1 would have been dropped. But one of the other GTP class racers had broken the rules and were cut instead, to the relief of Hamilton who only found out 5 hours before the race.

In the race itself, the car started with a lower front spoiler to aid stability, but this lost the car 10 mph in top speed. Hamilton drove the opening stint, but came into the pits after 11 minutes with brake vibration, but this was down to the brakes bedding in. Hamilton's stint was followed by Preece and then Salmon, with the Aston picking up 23 places in 2 hours. The Aston's fuel efficiency was good, better than first thought after the Silverstone Six Hour race, but this could have been improved, as GTP rules allowed for a 160 litre fuel tank to be used compared to the Aston's installed 120 litre tank to meet Group 5 regulations. But this could not be changed before the race.

At a routine stop at 10.19pm, cracks in the front brake discs were discovered. They were replaced in a pit stop lasting 31 minutes, but a lack of further spares meant that they had to reduce the use of the brakes and therefore use engine braking as much as possible for the remaining 17 hours and 41 minutes. Even so lap times remained constant. The only other serious problem encountered was a split differential oil tank that needed regular patching and topping up resulting in one 27 minute pit stop. A few more problems had to be dealt with before the end of the race, with a 2 minute stop having to be made to reset the lights on the car. Also the gear lever had to be replaced after Salmon broke it off and threw it out of the window during one of his stints. A marshal collected the gear knob and returned it to the garage, running all the way from his post.

Running steadily to the flag, the Aston Martin crossed the finish line after 2,210.78 miles (261 laps) of racing with Robin Hamilton, who had driven longest of the three drivers, at the wheel. RHAM/1 finished in 17th place overall (from 55 starters) and 3rd in class (GTP category), ironically, if it had stayed in Group 5 it would have finished 2nd in class. Pit stops totalled 3 hours and fuel consumption worked out at 5.75 mpg. With RHAM/1 using a maximum engine speed of 6,400 rpm, averaging 92.12 mph (including stops) or 104.70 mph (excluding stops). The fastest lap in the car was by Hamilton, recording 4 minutes 34.2 seconds (average speed of 112.25 mph). 18 of the 24 hours were driven with cracked front brake discs, the car was later given the name of 'Muncher' due to the rate that the car got through brake discs.

Hamilton achieved a lifelong ambition by driving an Aston Martin across the Le Mans finishing line and also confounded the pundits who claimed that the heavyweight DBS V8 was totally unsuitable for racing.

=== 1978 ===
For 1978, RHAM/1 was modified even more, now with and output of 800 bhp (600 kW) assisted by twin Garrett AiResearch turbos. But, fuel consumption dropped to 2.5 mpg (for the 1977 race, the average was 5.75 mpg) so the entry to Le Mans was withdrawn two weeks prior the race.

=== 1979 ===
RHAM/1 next appeared at the Silverstone Six Hours in May 1979, considerably lightened and re-modeled with a lower roof line, steeply raked windscreen, huge front air dam and dropped bonnet line. While beneath the bonnet was a twin-turbocharged version of the Aston V8 engine with fuel injection in place of the Weber carburettors, reducing boost pressure to give maximum power output of 650 bhp (480 kW) in race specification. But this reduced fuel consumption to around 4 mpg. The brakes were enlarged again, to 13" all round and water cooling was developed to help cool them (to be used at Le Mans). 350 lb in weight was also removed, in non Le Mans trim (no extra lights or equipment).

For the race at Silverstone Hamilton was joined by David Preece and Derek Bell, but Hamilton would not race, only working in the pits. After a De Dion tube in the rear suspension broke whilst Hamilton was driving in the practice. The car qualified 11th out of 25 entrants, with Bell recording 1 minute 37.54 seconds. In the race the car suffered trouble with brake fade and oil breathing problems, the car dropped down to 21st place after 1 hour 30 minutes, but back up to 17th after 3 hours. RHAM/1 finished 13th overall and 6th in class, after being hampered with more problems, of a blown tyre and small engine fire.

Hamilton received sponsorship for the 1979 Le Mans 24 hour from fellow AMOC member, Peter Millward through his company Link Systems. The car would again compete in the GTP class, weighing 1,546 kg it was again the heaviest in the class. Before the race the gearbox and engine were changed due to not being able to select first gear. During the race (with the same set of drivers as Silverstone that year) the V8 proved capable of lapping many seconds quicker than in 1977 (7.32 seconds). But the car suffered more problems, with an ongoing oil leak and then, after it had only competed 2 hours and 45 minutes (21 laps) of the race, a connecting rod broke due to a melted and holed piston.

=== 1980 ===
The car's next race, was at Silverstone Six Hours in 1980, where RHAM/1 now had a huge rear wing to counterbalance the downforce at the front of the car. Driven by Hamilton and Bell, the car retired early, as after just 61.5 miles (99.0 km), when the rear hub failed.

On 14 October 1980 RHAM/1 set a new World Land Speed Record for towing a caravan on the runway at Elvington Airfield, Yorkshire. Robin Hamilton towed an Alpha 14 caravan in the wet to an average speed of 124.91 mph, having seen 152 mph on the speedometer exiting the timed quarter mile. The speed beat the previous record of 108 mph.

=== 1981 ===
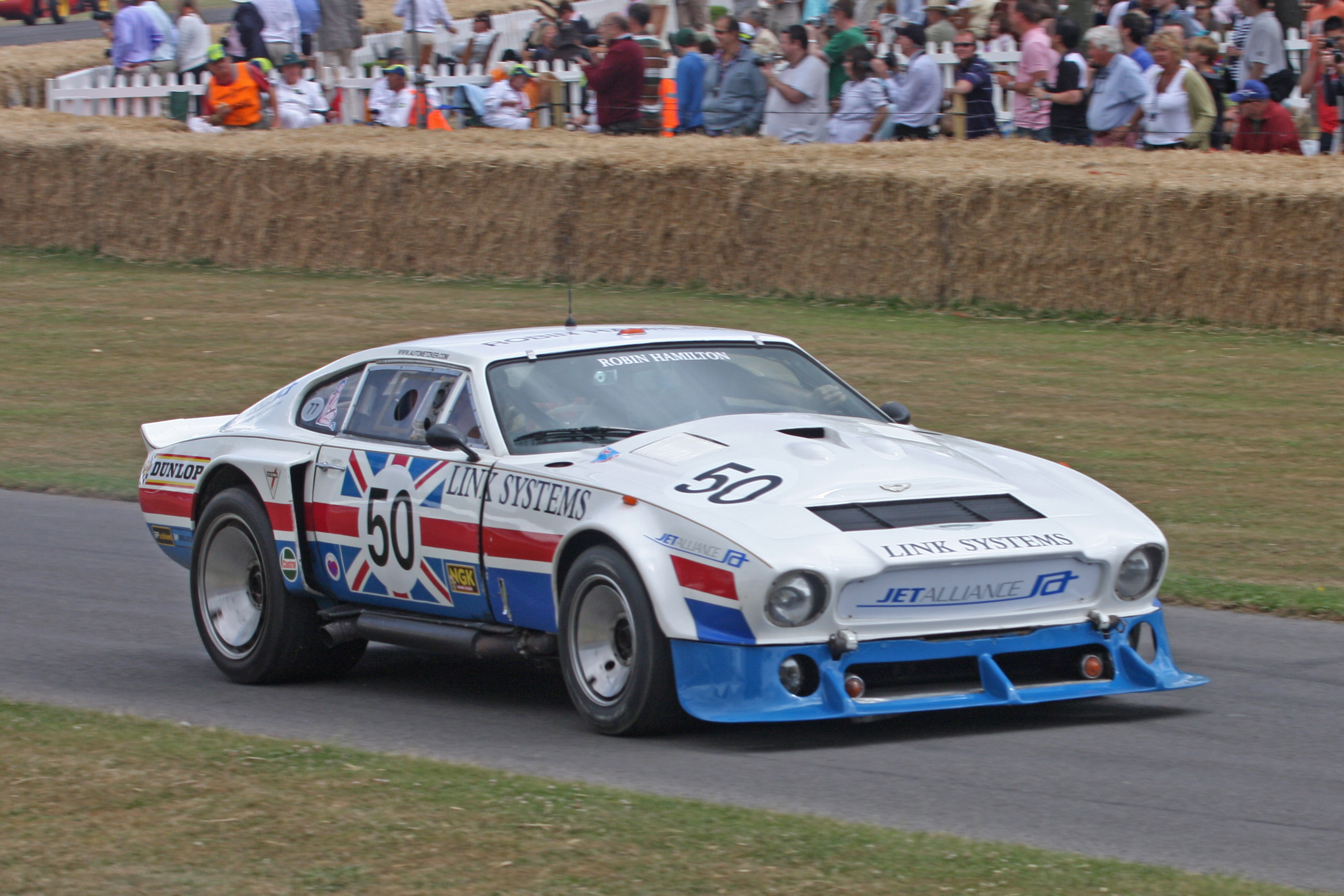
Aston Martin RHAM/1 at Goodwood Festival of Speed 2009

With his first hand experience at Le Mans, Robin Hamilton went on to develop the Aston Martin Nimrod Group C racing car in the early 1980s.

=== 1984 ===
RHAM/1 was put up for sale by Robin Hamilton in 1984 when he closed his business. It was initially bought by Chris Crawford and subsequently sold to Brian Dunn who kept the car well maintained and in secure storage for a number of years but did not race it.

=== 2005 ===
In 2005 RHAM/1 was for sale with Nicholas Mee's Aston Martin Car Company.

=== 2006 ===
RHAM/1 was on sale at Bonhams' Aston Martin auction held on 13 May 2006 at Works Service, Newport Pagnell

=== Results ===
Year	Race	Track	Grid	Lap	Class	No	Team	Drivers	Colours	Sponsors	Pos
1977	World Championship 6 Hours	Silverstone	15th	1:43.490	Gr. 5	22	(United Kingdom) Robin Hamilton	(United Kingdom) Robin Hamilton (United Kingdom) David Preece	Red/white/blue	Robin Hamilton Aston Martin	NC
1977	24 Hours of Le Mans	Circuit de la Sarthe	56th	4:31.800	GTP	83	(United Kingdom) SAS Robin Hamilton	(United Kingdom) Robin Hamilton (United Kingdom) David Preece (United Kingdom) Mike Salmon	Red/white/blue	SAS Group Exporters	17th
1978	24 Hours of Le Mans	Circuit de la Sarthe	28th	1:48.030	GTP +3	70	(United Kingdom) Robin Hamilton	(United Kingdom) Robin Hamilton (United Kingdom) David Preece			DNA
1979	World Manufacturers Championship 6 Hours	Silverstone	11th	1:37.540	Gr. 5	12	(United Kingdom) Robin Hamilton - Aston Martin Distributors	(United Kingdom) Robin Hamilton (United Kingdom) David Preece (United Kingdom) Derek Bell	White (+red/blue)	PLS-FMS/Link Systems	13th
1979	24 Hours of Le Mans	Circuit de la Sarthe	55th	4:24.480	GTP +3	50	(United Kingdom) Robin Hamilton	(United Kingdom) Robin Hamilton (United Kingdom) David Preece (United Kingdom) Mike Salmon	White (+red/blue)	Link Systems	DNF
1980	World Championship 6 Hours	Silverstone	24th	1:40.100	GTP	10	(United Kingdom) Ault & Wiborg Ltd	(United Kingdom) Robin Hamilton (United Kingdom) Derek Bell (United Kingdom) Willie Green	White (+red/blue)	Robin Hamilton	DNF

== DBS V8/10071/R ==
Robin Hamilton built a second Le Mans styled DBS V8 car based on the look of RHAM/1 as it was in 1978. The car was assembled for Peter Griggs who wanted a replica of the car. The car, with chassis number DBSV8/10071/R featured a fibre glass front end and Piper prepared V8 engine, but the car had no turbocharger. Fuel injection was replaced by 48 IDA down-draught Weber carburettors.

The car had some success with Griggs, winning a race at the 1981 AMOC Brands Hatch meeting, even though the car was quite heavy. In 1982 the car finished 2nd at Brands Hatch and 4th at an Intermarque race at Silverstone.

Richard Williams bought the car in 1987 with intentions of upgrading the car with an experimental 6.3 litre V8 engine and racing it in the Intermarque events. However the disassembled car was sold to Marsh Plant Holdings where it was reassembled.

== See also ==
- Aston Martin
- Aston Martin race cars
- Nimrod Racing Automobiles
- 24 Hours of Le Mans
- Aston Martin Racing
- Aston Martin DPLM
