= Aston Martin DPLM =

Gipfast Special (DP/801/H)
- Category: Le Mans Racer, Sports car racing
- Constructor: David Preece, Ken Heywood

Technical specifications
- Chassis: Aluminium sheeted, spaceframed chassis with integral roll-cage, fibre glass panels
- Suspension (front): In-board coil springs and dampers with rocking arms
- Suspension (rear): Reversed 'A' wishbones
- Engine: Aston Martin 5,340 cc V8, 480 bhp (360 kW) @ 7,000 rpm, naturally aspirated mid-mounted
- Transmission: Hewland LG600 Manual gearbox, 4 plate clutch
- Weight: 1160 kg
- Tyres: Dunlop

Competition history
- Notable entrants: (United Kingdom) Simon Phillips Racing (United Kingdom) David Preece
- Notable drivers: (United Kingdom) David Preece (United Kingdom) Robin Hamilton (United Kingdom) Simon Phillips (United Kingdom) Richard Jenvey (United Kingdom) François Duret
- Debut: 1980 Silverstone 6 Hours
Races	Wins	Poles	F/Laps
1	0	0	0

Aston Martin DPLM (DP/812/H)
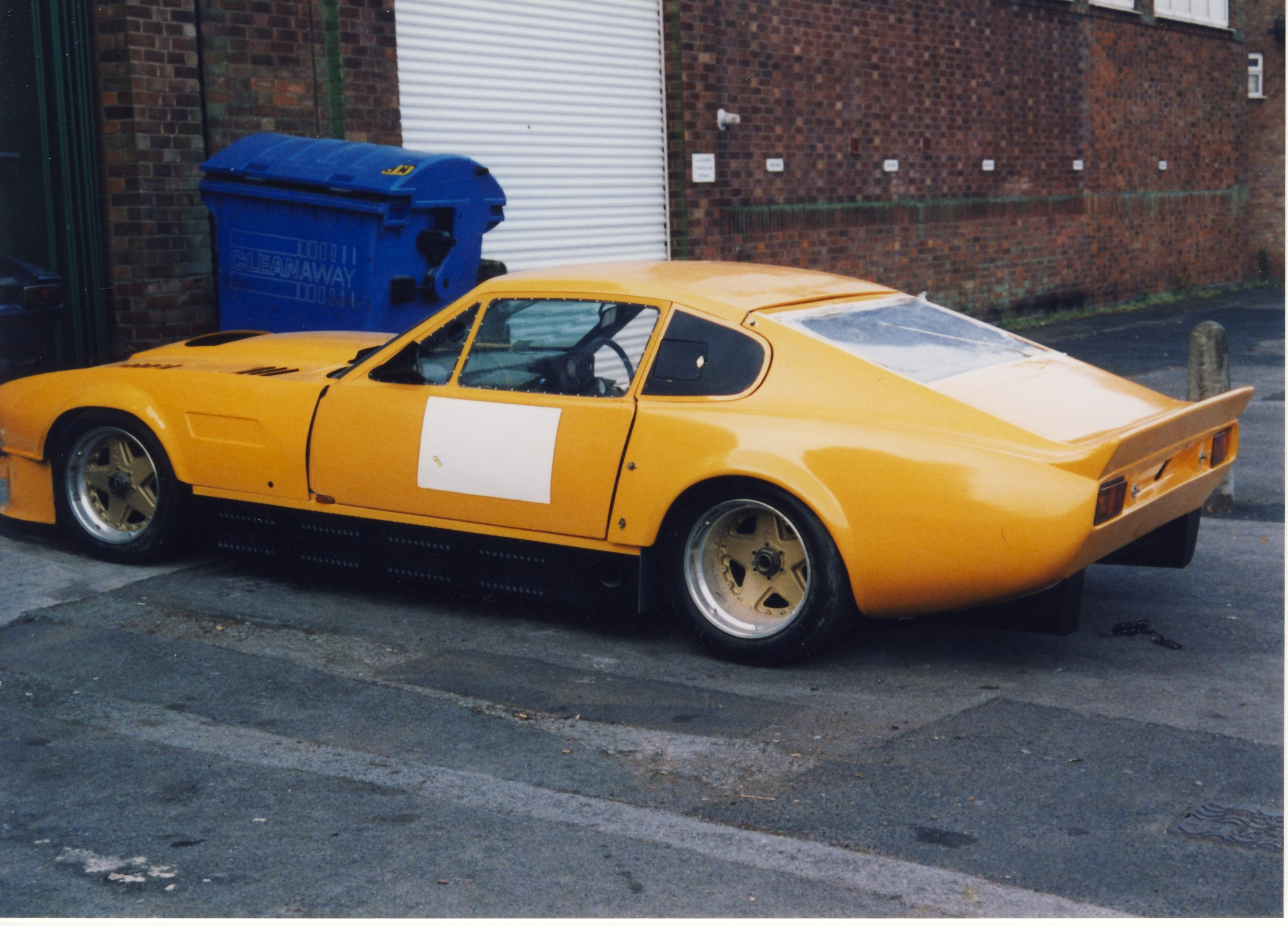
- Category: Le Mans Racer, Sports car racing
- Constructor: David Preece, Ken Heywood

Technical specifications
- Chassis: Aluminium sheeted, spaceframed chassis with fibre glass panels
- Suspension (front): Unequal wishbones, coilover dampers and front anti-roll bar
- Engine: Aston Martin 5,340 cc V8, 560 bhp (420 kW), naturally aspirated, FR Layout
- Transmission: ZF 5-Speed Manual Aston Martin/Sailsbury differential, Salisbury plate type LSD
- Weight: 1100 kg
- Tyres: Dunlop

Competition history
- Notable entrants: (United Kingdom) David Preece
- Notable drivers: (United Kingdom) David Preece (United Kingdom) Reg Woodcock
- Debut: 1982 Brands Hatch 1000 km
Races	Wins	Poles	F/Laps
1	0	0	0

The Aston Martin DPLM (formally known as the Gipfast Special) is a sports prototype racing car that was built by David Preece and Ken Heywood. Utilizing an Aston Martin V8 engine tuned by AVJ Developments, the car was designed to participate in the World Sportscar Championship as well as the 1980 24 Hours of Le Mans. The original Gipfast Special was damaged in its debut race in 1980, while a second chassis was constructed for use in 1982. Despite the team's intentions, the DPLM only participated in two major races.

== History ==
=== DP/801/H ===
After partnering with Robin Hamilton in the 1977 24 Hours of Le Mans in the unique Aston Martin RHAM/1, Shropshire dentist David Preece set out to create his own car which could compete at Le Mans. During 1979 and 1980 Preece was joined by skilled engineer Ken Heywood to design and build the car which would eventually become known as the Gipfast Special. Other than the engine, most of the project was built in Preece's own garage. The Gipfast was powered by a mid mounted Aston Martin V8 engine based on the production engine utilized in the Aston Martin V8, similar to that used on the RHAM/1. The engine was tuned by AVJ Developments of Pershore, featuring dry sump lubrication and Cosworth DFV style fuel injection, producing around 480 bhp. The initial chassis, DP/801/H, was completed in early 1980 and entered in the World Championship 6 Hours of Silverstone in May of that year. Partnered alongside the returning RHAM/1 under the control of Simon Phillips Racing, the two Aston Martins ran under the title of sponsor Ault & Wiborg. The Gipfast struggled for speed in its debut, qualifying 29th out of 30 entries and was slower than the RHAM/1. At the start of the six-hour endurance race, the DPLM suffered a suspension failure after only four laps and crashed heavily. The damage to the car was unable to be repaired in time for Le Mans a month later and the car was abandoned later that year.

=== DP/812/H ===
After the demise of DP/801/H, Preece and Heywood spent 1981-82 developing a new car, now known as the DPLM (Dave Preece Le Mans). The second chassis, DP/812/H, was front engined and retained the same AVJ built V8 engine now rumoured to be producing 560 bhp. Debuting in Britain once again at the World Sports Car Championship 1000 Kilometers at Brands Hatch, the car qualified 28th out of 33 entrants. The race performance was stunted as the DPLM crashed in the opening laps in treturous weather conditions. Following the second failure for the DPLM project, the car was retired from competitive use and made successful appearances in Aston Martin Owners Club and other national events during the rest of the 1980s driven by Preece and later Barrie 'Whizzo' Williams, for the then owner Stewart Bond. The car was purchased from Bond around the year 2000 and was sympathetically restored and recommissioned by its current owners of the Hipwell family, appearing at the AMOC Horsfall meeting at Silverstone in 2003 where the car suffered from fuel feed problems and DNS.

== See also ==
- Aston Martin RHAM/1
- Aston Martin Nimrod
