= Aston Martin Owners Club =

The Aston Martin Owners Club (AMOC, pronounced am-oc) is a club for owners of Aston Martin automobiles, established in England in 1935. It is one of the oldest one-make car enthusiast clubs, and also one of the largest by worldwide membership.

== History ==
The club was found by Mortimer Morris-Goodall. Morris-Goodall had won an automobile race aged 20, and met Bert Bertelli shortly after, eventually purchasing the team car LM7 and receiving an invitation to drive "under works control" at Le Mans in 1933. Sammy Davis agreed that a club for Aston Martin owners would be a good idea and inserted a note in The Autocar magazine, of which he was sports editor, on 3 and 17 May 1935, calling a meeting. The meeting at the Grafton Hotel on 25 May was attended by 20-30 people, who elected a committee including Lance Prideaux-Brune, Dick Anthony, Maurice Falkner, Harold Bevan, Dorothy Bean and Peter Cadbury.

Charles Jarrott became the president and Sammy Davis the vice-president, with Leslie Keevil as honorary treasurer and Mort Goodall as honorary secretary. The club's activities, mostly social, including an annual dinner-dance at the Park Lane Hotel, were interrupted by the Second World War.

The club convened again at a meeting led by Dick Stallebrass at the Royal Automobile Club on 5 March 1948. However, following Stallebrass's death at Spa four months later, Dudley Coram took over a leading role in the reformed club, with Eric Cutler as chairman. Coram served in every different position in the club before his death in 1976.

Although the pre-war archives have been lost, the present rules are believed to enshrine the same principles as those drafted in 1935. AMOC's Memorandum of Association states, among other things, that the club is established to "promote the sport and pastime of motoring", "develop interest in the Aston Martin car" and "encourage social intercourse between Members". In the UK, the club organises five race meetings a year, at least one hill climb and three sprints. The club has members worldwide, with thriving sections in Germany, the Netherlands, Switzerland and the United States. These groups also organise various events for their members.

AMOC celebrated its Diamond Jubilee in 1995. The traditional annual events all took on a Jubilee focus and were supplemented by around 30 other special attractions, local, national and international. The year began with a Grand Jubilee Ball at the Dorchester Hotel in London, featuring a display of Aston Martin cars, with an Aston Martin DB7 exhibited outside the ballroom. Inside, cars with chassis numbers 1914; 1925; D5/569/S; C7/719/U; LML/50/396 and DB5/2261/R were arranged on specially constructed stands.

A silver Diamond Jubilee Virage Volante was used as a display case for a million dollars' worth of Cartier jewellery. The AMOC President, John Dawnay, received the club's premier award, the Bertelli Trophy, at the AGM. A Founders Day Dinner was also held at the Grafton Hotel where the club had formed on 25 May 1935. Other events included special displays at the St. John Horsfall and a historic weekend at the Silverstone Circuit.

The club, known to members as "The Family", meets at social and competitive events and issues publications, AM Quarterly and the News Sheet, which include reports of club events around the world.

On 23 May 1997, Paula Brown and John Martin unveiled the Cairn, erected in memory of Lionel Martin, at the top of Aston Hill in Buckinghamshire. Originally conceived by the club's chairman, Ian Macgregor, this memorial was designed by club member John Evans and constructed on Forestry Commission land with funding from AMOC and AML Ltd.

In January 1998, AMOC purchased a 600-year-old grange barn in Drayton St. Leonard, Oxfordshire, to act as its new headquarters. The first stage of the work to refurbish the barn started during 1999 and was completed in 2001, with the club relocating that year from its previous base in Sutton-in-the-Isle. In March 2002, John Dawnay, president since 1980, died, and his wife Diana became the new president.

The new headquarters at Drayton St. Leonard in Oxfordshire was officially opened in April 2002. Prince Michael of Kent was scheduled to perform the opening, but was unable to attend due to the death of his aunt, Elizabeth Bowes-Lyon. Instead, the building was opened by the president, Diana Dawnay, on Prince Michael's behalf.

AMOC maintains strong links to Aston Martin Lagonda, each supporting the other in various enterprises.

== Publication ==
AM Quarterly is the official magazine of the Aston Martin Owners Club and contains technical articles, historical items, factory news and reports of AMOC activities from around the world. It is published four times a year.

Every four years, a Register of Members' Cars is published and has become the 'standard work' on the Marque. The Aston Martin Heritage Trust now has the responsibility for publishing this work.

== See also ==
- Aston Martin Heritage Trust Museum
