= Ian Macgregor =

Ian Macgregor (born c. 1937) is a British investment executive and chartered accountant. He is the former chief investment officer of The Wellcome Trust, oversaw growth of nearly £1bn per annum over fifteen years. The Wellcome Trust was the then-largest foundation in the world, with total assets valued at about £14bn at his retirement in 2000. Regarded by many as the most successful investment officer ever seen in the not-for-profit sector, Macgregor was behind the largest private share sale on record: initial flotation of Wellcome Plc.

He was a judge in the 2001 UK Charity Awards. and has served as a non-executive director for International Biotechnology Trust PLC. As President of Charity Tax Group (formerly Charity Tax Relief Group), he lobbied for VAT exemption for UK based charities.

He has also served as a Royal Commissioner of the Royal Commission for the Exhibition of 1851, alongside those such as Sir James Dyson and President Prince Philip, Duke of Edinburgh.
