= 1980 Silverstone 6 Hours =

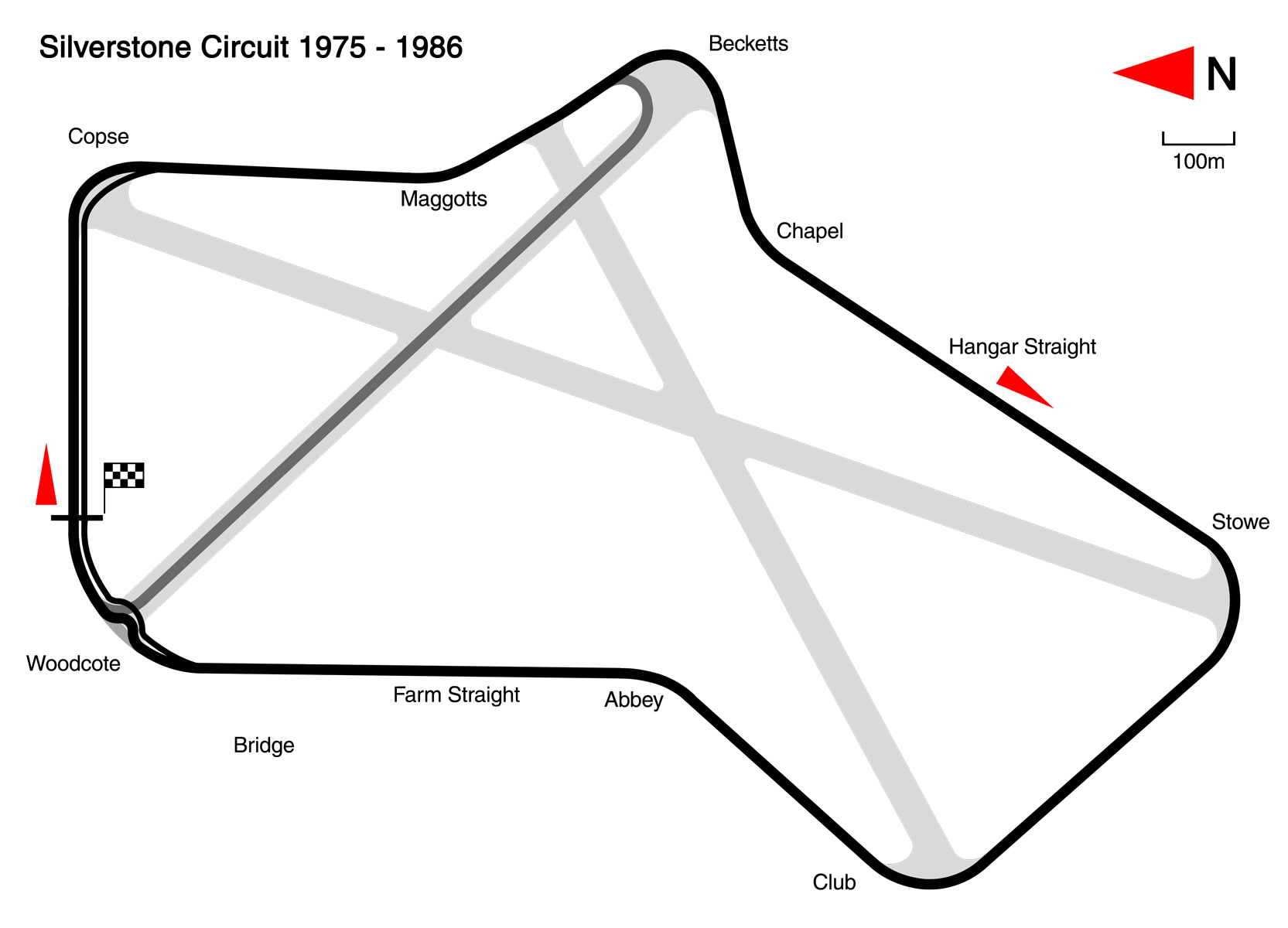
Map of the Silverstone Circuit (1975-1986)

The 1980 Silverstone 6 Hours, was the fifth round of both the World Championship for Makes and FIA World Challenge for Endurance Drivers, and was held at the Silverstone Grand Prix circuit, on 11 May.

== Report ==
=== Entry ===
A total of 40 cars were entered for the event, across eight classes ranging through Group 2 up to Group 6. Of these 31 cars practised.

=== Qualifying ===
The Porsche 935 K3 of Porsche Kermer Racing, driven by John Fitzpatrick, partnered by Guy Edwards and Axel Plankenhorn took pole position. They were joined on the front row by the André Chavalley Racing’s ACR-Cosworth 80 of Patrick Gaillard, André Chevalley and Francois Trisconi.

=== Race ===
The race was held for 6 Hours, on Silverstone’s Grand Prix circuit, a distance of 1,106.6 km. Alain de Cadenet and Desiré Wilson took the winner spoils for the second round in a fortnight, for the de Cadenet team, driving their De Cadenet Lola-Cosworth LM1. The pair won in a time of 6hr 00:00.000mins., averaging a speed of 114.602ph. Whilst Wilson was driving, she lost the lead when she locked the brakes and was penalised one lap for missing the Woodcote chicane, but she produced a strong drive in spite of a misfire, to retake the lead 25 minutes remaining. In Italy, de Cadenet and Wilson had beaten Jürgen Barth and Henri Pescarolo in a Porsche 935K3. At Silverstone, Barth was second again, but this time sharing Siegfried Brunn’s amazing Porsche 908/3. Third but so nearly a late retirement, was the Porsche 935 of John Paul, Sr. and Brian Redman. Riccardo Patrese’s work Lancia Montecarlo crashed early in the race when its suspension broke up. But the sister car of Walter Röhrl and Michele Alboreto, streamed onto a class winning fourth place. The race was initially dominated by a brand new Kremer Porsche, destined for Le Mans and driven by pole-man Fitzpatrick, joined by Edwards and Plankenhorn. However, the car retired.

== Classification ==
=== Silverstone 6 Hours ===
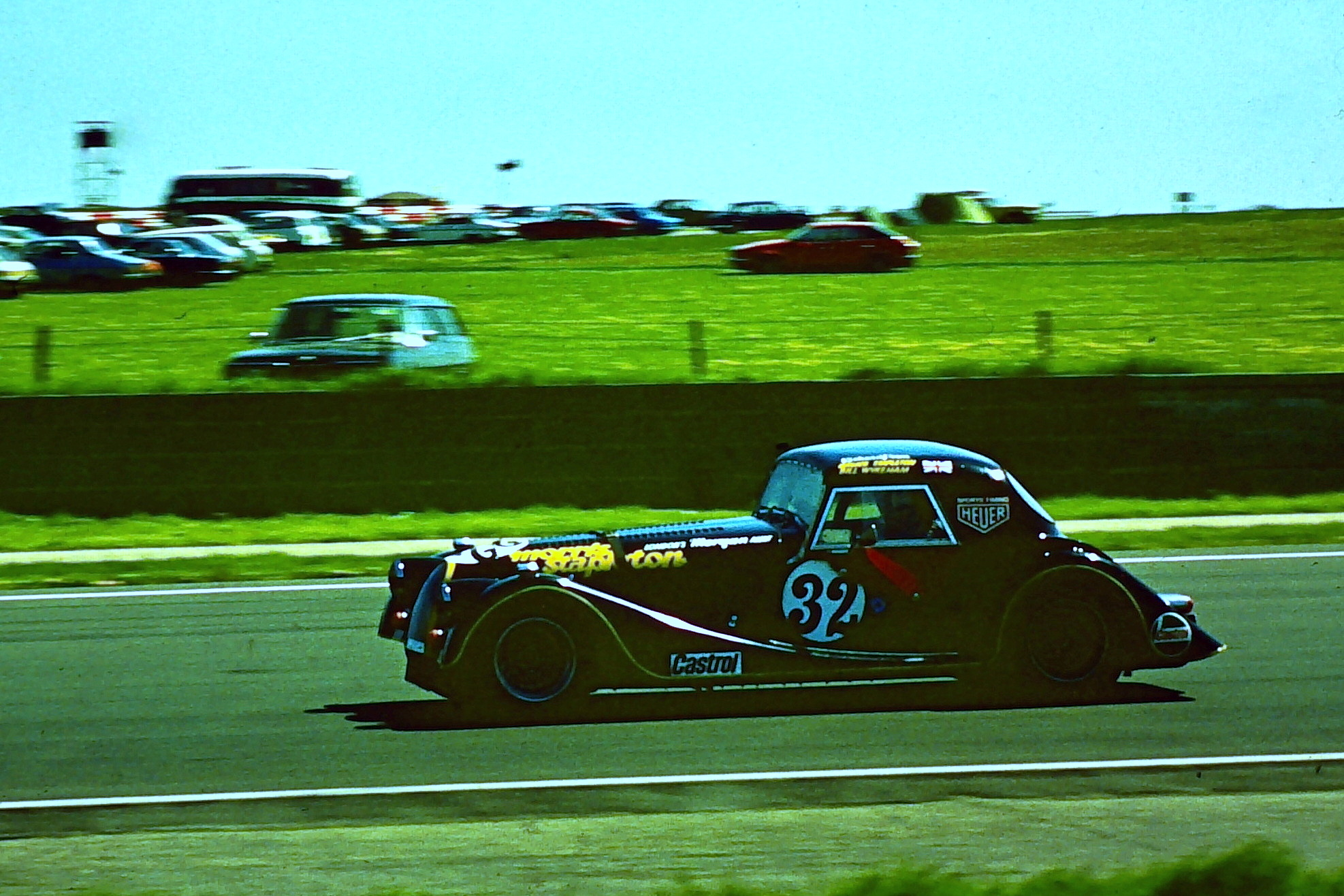
The Morgan Plus 8 of Richard Down, Bruce Stapleton & Bill Wykenham contesting the 1980 Silverstone 6 Hours

Class Winners are in Bold text.

- Note: Class winners in bold

Pos	Class	No	Team	Drivers	Chassis	Tyres	Laps
Pos	Class	No	Team	Drivers	Engine	Tyres	Laps
1	**S +2.0**	**8**	**(United Kingdom) Alain de Cadenet**	**(United Kingdom) Alain de Cadenet (South Africa) Desiré Wilson**	**De Cadenet LM**	D	**235**
1	**S +2.0**	**8**	**(United Kingdom) Alain de Cadenet**	**(United Kingdom) Alain de Cadenet (South Africa) Desiré Wilson**	**Ford Cosworth DFV 3.0 L V8**	D	**235**
2	S +2.0	5	(West Germany) Siegfried Brunn	(West Germany) Jürgen Barth (West Germany) Siegfried Brunn	Porsche 908/3	D	235
2	S +2.0	5	(West Germany) Siegfried Brunn	(West Germany) Jürgen Barth (West Germany) Siegfried Brunn	Porsche 3.0 L F8	D	235
3	**IMSA**	**18**	**(United States) JLP Racing**	**(United States) John Paul, Sr. (United Kingdom) Brian Redman**	**Porsche 935 JLP-2**	G	**234**
3	**IMSA**	**18**	**(United States) JLP Racing**	**(United States) John Paul, Sr. (United Kingdom) Brian Redman**	Porsche Type-935 3.0 L F6 Turbo	G	**234**
4	**Gr. 5**	**54**	**(Italy) Lancia Corse**	**(West Germany) Walter Röhrl (Italy) Michele Alboreto**	**Lancia Beta Montecarlo Turbo**	P	**232**
4	**Gr. 5**	**54**	**(Italy) Lancia Corse**	**(West Germany) Walter Röhrl (Italy) Michele Alboreto**	**Lancia 1.4 L I4 Turbo**	P	**232**
5	Gr. 5	16	(West Germany) Vegla Racing Team	(West Germany) Dieter Schornstein (West Germany) Harald Grohs	Porsche 935/77A	D	228
5	Gr. 5	16	(West Germany) Vegla Racing Team	(West Germany) Dieter Schornstein (West Germany) Harald Grohs	Porsche Type-935 2.9 L F6 Turbo	D	228
6	Gr. 5	16	(West Germany) Weralit Elora Team	(West Germany) Edgar Dören (West Germany) Jürgen Lässig (West Germany) Gerhard Holup	Porsche 935 K3	D	225
6	Gr. 5	16	(West Germany) Weralit Elora Team	(West Germany) Edgar Dören (West Germany) Jürgen Lässig (West Germany) Gerhard Holup	Porsche Type-935 3.0 L F6 Turbo	D	225
7	IMSA	11	(United Kingdom) Rosso Ltd.	(United Kingdom) Steve O'Rourke (United Kingdom) Chris Craft (United Kingdom) Vic Norman	Ferrari 512BB	D	207
7	IMSA	11	(United Kingdom) Rosso Ltd.	(United Kingdom) Steve O'Rourke (United Kingdom) Chris Craft (United Kingdom) Vic Norman	Ferrari 4.9 L F12	D	207
8	**GT**	**29**	**(United Kingdom) Autofarm Ltd.**	**(United Kingdom) Richard Cleare (United Kingdom) Tony Dron**	**Porsche 934**		**206**
8	**GT**	**29**	**(United Kingdom) Autofarm Ltd.**	**(United Kingdom) Richard Cleare (United Kingdom) Tony Dron**	**Porsche Type-930 3.0 L F6 Turbo**		**206**
9	IMSA	12	(United States) Z & W Enterprises Racing Inc.	(Venezuela) Ernesto Soto (United States) Pierre Honegger (United States) Mark Hutchins	Mazda RX-7	G	206
9	IMSA	12	(United States) Z & W Enterprises Racing Inc.	(Venezuela) Ernesto Soto (United States) Pierre Honegger (United States) Mark Hutchins	Mazda 1.2 L 2-rotor	G	206
10	GT	31	(France) Christian Bussi	(France) Jacques Guérin (France) Frédéric Alliot (France) Christian Bussi	Porsche 934	D	206
10	GT	31	(France) Christian Bussi	(France) Jacques Guérin (France) Frédéric Alliot (France) Christian Bussi	Porsche Type-930 3.0 L F6 Turbo	D	206
11	**T**	**58**	**(Switzerland) Eggenberger Motorsport**	**(Switzerland) Enzo Calderari (Switzerland) Marco Vanoli**	**BMW 320i**	D	**197**
11	**T**	**58**	**(Switzerland) Eggenberger Motorsport**	**(Switzerland) Enzo Calderari (Switzerland) Marco Vanoli**	**BMW M12 2.0 L I4**	D	**197**
DNF	IMSA	6	(United Kingdom) March Racing	(Belgium) Patrick Nève (West Germany) Michael Korten	March-BMW M1	D	208
DNF	IMSA	6	(United Kingdom) March Racing	(Belgium) Patrick Nève (West Germany) Michael Korten	BMW M88 3.5 L I6	D	208
DNF	S 2.0	35	(Italy) Scuderia Torino Corse (Italy) Osella Squadra Corse	(Italy) Lella Lombardi (Italy) Vittorio Brambilla	Osella PA8	P	181
DNF	S 2.0	35	(Italy) Scuderia Torino Corse (Italy) Osella Squadra Corse	(Italy) Lella Lombardi (Italy) Vittorio Brambilla	BMW M12 2.0 L I4	P	181
DNF	Gr. 5	20	(United Kingdom) Charles Ivey Racing	(United Kingdom) John Cooper (United Kingdom) Pete Lovett (United Kingdom) Dudley Wood	Porsche 935 K3	D	175
DNF	Gr. 5	20	(United Kingdom) Charles Ivey Racing	(United Kingdom) John Cooper (United Kingdom) Pete Lovett (United Kingdom) Dudley Wood	Porsche Type-935 3.0 L F6 Turbo	D	175
DNF	S 2.0	42	(United Kingdom) Dorset Racing Associates	(United Kingdom) Nick Faure (United Kingdom) Nick Mason (United Kingdom) Peter Clark	Lola T297	D	166
DNF	S 2.0	42	(United Kingdom) Dorset Racing Associates	(United Kingdom) Nick Faure (United Kingdom) Nick Mason (United Kingdom) Peter Clark	Ford Cosworth BDG 2.0 L I4	D	166
DNF	Gr. 5	55	(Italy) Jolly Club	(Italy) Carlo Facetti (Italy) Martino Finotto	Lancia Beta Montecarlo Turbo	P	165
DNF	Gr. 5	55	(Italy) Jolly Club	(Italy) Carlo Facetti (Italy) Martino Finotto	Lancia 1.4 L I4 Turbo	P	165
DNF	Gr. 5	19	(West Germany) Porsche Kremer Racing	(United Kingdom) Guy Edwards (United Kingdom) John Fitzpatrick (West Germany) Axel Plankenhorn	Porsche 935 K3/80	D	128
DNF	Gr. 5	19	(West Germany) Porsche Kremer Racing	(United Kingdom) Guy Edwards (United Kingdom) John Fitzpatrick (West Germany) Axel Plankenhorn	Porsche Type-935 3.2 L F6 Turbo	D	128
DNF	GT	32	(United Kingdom) Morris Stapleton	(United Kingdom) Richard Down (United Kingdom) Bruce Stapleton (United Kingdom) Bill Wykeham	Morgan Plus 8		121
DNF	GT	32	(United Kingdom) Morris Stapleton	(United Kingdom) Richard Down (United Kingdom) Bruce Stapleton (United Kingdom) Bill Wykeham	Rover 3.5 L V8		121
DNF	Gr. 5	24	(United Kingdom) Malaya Garage Ltd.	(United Kingdom) Adrian Yates-Smith (United Kingdom) Mike Wilds (United Kingdom) Barrie Williams	Porsche 911 SC		115
DNF	Gr. 5	24	(United Kingdom) Malaya Garage Ltd.	(United Kingdom) Adrian Yates-Smith (United Kingdom) Mike Wilds (United Kingdom) Barrie Williams	Porsche 2.8 L F6		115
DNF	GT	30	(Switzerland) Formel Rennsport Club	(Switzerland) Peter Zbinden (Switzerland) Edy Kofel	Porsche 934		85
DNF	GT	30	(Switzerland) Formel Rennsport Club	(Switzerland) Peter Zbinden (Switzerland) Edy Kofel	Porsche Type-930 3.0 L F6 Turbo		85
DNF	Gr. 5	27	(United Kingdom) Tony Wingrove	(United Kingdom) Tony Wingrove (United Kingdom) Barry Robinson	Porsche Carrera RSR	D	45
DNF	Gr. 5	27	(United Kingdom) Tony Wingrove	(United Kingdom) Tony Wingrove (United Kingdom) Barry Robinson	Porsche 2.8 L F6	D	45
DNF	S 2.0	43	(United Kingdom) David Mercer	(United Kingdom) David Mercer (United Kingdom) Mike Chittenden (United Kingdom) Richard Jones	Vogue SP2		45
DNF	S 2.0	43	(United Kingdom) David Mercer	(United Kingdom) David Mercer (United Kingdom) Mike Chittenden (United Kingdom) Richard Jones	Ford Cosworth BDG 2.0 L I4		45
DNF	Gr. 5	53	(Italy) Lancia Corse	(Italy) Riccardo Patrese (United States) Eddie Cheever	Lancia Beta Montecarlo Turbo	P	26
DNF	Gr. 5	53	(Italy) Lancia Corse	(Italy) Riccardo Patrese (United States) Eddie Cheever	Lancia 1.4 L I4 Turbo	P	26
DNF	S +2.0	1	(Switzerland) André Chevalley Racing	(France) Patrick Gaillard (Switzerland) André Chevalley (Switzerland) François Trisconi	ACR 80	D	25
DNF	S +2.0	1	(Switzerland) André Chevalley Racing	(France) Patrick Gaillard (Switzerland) André Chevalley (Switzerland) François Trisconi	Ford Cosworth DFV 3.0 L V8	D	25
DNF	GTP	10	(United Kingdom) Ault & Wilborg Ltd.	(United Kingdom) Robin Hamilton (United Kingdom) Derek Bell	Aston Martin AMV8	D	20
DNF	GTP	10	(United Kingdom) Ault & Wilborg Ltd.	(United Kingdom) Robin Hamilton (United Kingdom) Derek Bell	Aston Martin 5.3 V8 Turbo	D	20
DNF	GTP	9	(United Kingdom) Ault & Wilborg Ltd.	(United Kingdom) David Preece (United Kingdom) Simon Phillips	Gipfast Special	D	4
DNF	GTP	9	(United Kingdom) Ault & Wilborg Ltd.	(United Kingdom) David Preece (United Kingdom) Simon Phillips	Aston Martin 5.3 V8 Turbo	D	4
DNS	S +2.0	2	(United Kingdom) Ian Bracey	(United Kingdom) Tiff Needell (United Kingdom) Tony Trimmer (United Kingdom) Ian Bracey	Ibec P6		-
DNS	S +2.0	2	(United Kingdom) Ian Bracey	(United Kingdom) Tiff Needell (United Kingdom) Tony Trimmer (United Kingdom) Ian Bracey	Ford Cosworth DFV 3.0 L V8		-
DNS	Gr. 5	47	(Denmark) Willy F Racing Team	(Denmark) Preben Kristoffersen (Sweden) Kurt Simonsen	BMW 320		-
DNS	Gr. 5	47	(Denmark) Willy F Racing Team	(Denmark) Preben Kristoffersen (Sweden) Kurt Simonsen	BMW M12 2.0 L I4		-
DNS	Gr. 5	50	(United Kingdom) Richard Jenvey	(United Kingdom) Lawrie Hickman (United Kingdom) Richard Janvey	Lotus Esprit S1	G	-
DNS	Gr. 5	50	(United Kingdom) Richard Jenvey	(United Kingdom) Lawrie Hickman (United Kingdom) Richard Janvey	Ford Cosworth BDG 2.0 L I4	G	-
DNS	Gr. 5	51	(United Kingdom) Frox Clothing Company Ltd.	(Republic of Ireland) Martin Birrane (United Kingdom) Syd Fox	Lotus Esprit S1		-
DNS	Gr. 5	51	(United Kingdom) Frox Clothing Company Ltd.	(Republic of Ireland) Martin Birrane (United Kingdom) Syd Fox	Ford Cosworth BDG 2.0 L I4		-
DNS	Gr. 5	54	(United Kingdom) Janspeed/ADA with the TR Register	(United Kingdom) John Sheldon (United Kingdom) Ian Harrower	Triumph TR8 Turbo	D	-
DNS	Gr. 5	54	(United Kingdom) Janspeed/ADA with the TR Register	(United Kingdom) John Sheldon (United Kingdom) Ian Harrower	Triumph 3.6 L V8 Turbo	D	-

- Fastest lap: Porsche Kremer Racing #19, 1:25.53secs. (124.13 mph)
