= Drayton St. Leonard =

Village in Oxfordshire, England

Coordinates: 51.663°N 1.138°W

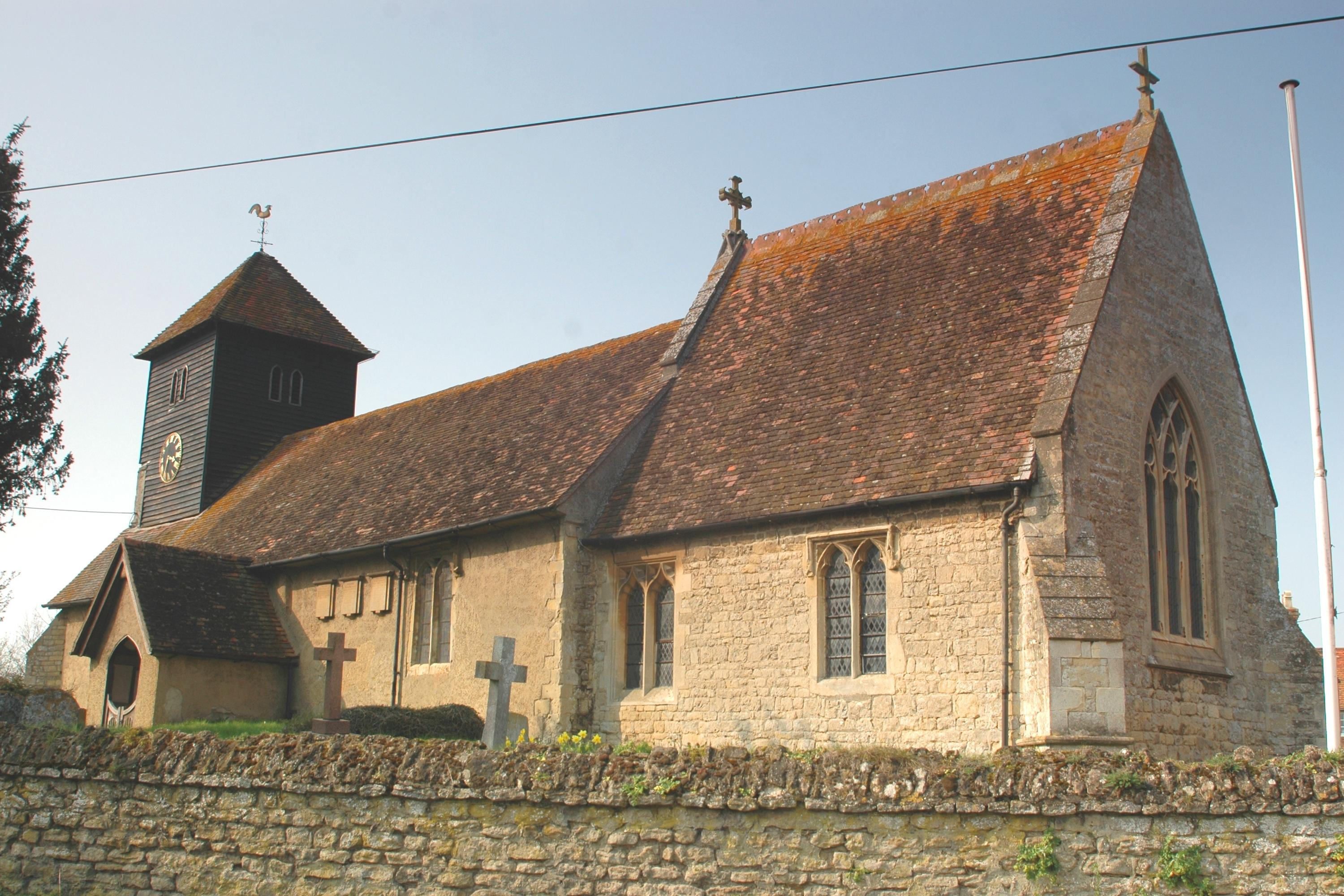
- St. Leonard and St. Catherine's Parish Church

- Location within Oxfordshire
- Area: 5.27 km^{2} (2.03 sq mi)
- Population: 261 (2001 census)
  - Density: 50/km^{2} (130/sq mi)
- OS grid reference: SU5996
- Civil parish: Drayton St. Leonard
- District: South Oxfordshire
- Shire county: Oxfordshire
- Region: South East
- Country: England
- Sovereign state: United Kingdom
- Post town: Wallingford
- Postcode district: OX10
- Dialling code: 01865
- Police: Thames Valley
- Fire: Oxfordshire
- Ambulance: South Central
- UK Parliament: Henley and Thame
- Website: Welcome to Drayton St Leonard

Drayton St. Leonard is a village and civil parish on the River Thame in Oxfordshire, about 8 miles (13 km) southeast of Oxford.

== Manor ==
The Domesday Book of 1086 does not list Drayton separately. At that time the land was part of the Bishop of Lincoln's estate of Dorchester. The village developed as a subsidiary of Dorchester. Upon the Dissolution of the Monasteries Dorchester Abbey surrendered its lands to the Crown and Drayton remained with the Dorchester estate. By the 18th century the Earl of Abingdon was the principal landowner. In the 19th century the family still held the largest acreage, but Trinity College, Oxford had also become a significant landowner in the parish. Most of the land of the parish was farmed on an open field system until it was enclosed in 1861.

== Church and chapel ==
The Church of England parish church of Saint Leonard and Saint Catherine existed by 1146, when it was a chapel of the peculiar of Dorchester Abbey. The Norman doorways in the north and south walls date from this time. In the 13th century a transeptal chapel was added on the north side and new windows were inserted in the nave, all in the Early English Gothic style. The bell tower is timber, which is unusual for Oxfordshire, (though there is a similar timber tower with a pyramid roof at Berrick Salome). The oldest bell was originally cast in 1470, which could also be the date that the tower was built. In the 16th century two of the nave windows were enlarged in the Perpendicular Gothic style.

A stained glass portrayal of St Leonard in the lancet window in the north wall of the chancel originates from the middle of the 14th century, but most of the present pieces of its glass date from the 1859 restoration. Ninian Comper and William Bucknall made the stained glass in the three-light east window of the chancel and two-light south-east window of the nave in 1894. The latter is based on a painting by the 15th century Early Netherlandish painter Dirk Bouts in St. Peter's Church, Leuven in Flanders. In 1859, the building was drastically restored under the direction of the Gothic Revival architect G.E. Street. The external arch of the Norman south doorway was removed, all tracery was removed from the chancel windows, and a Sanctus bell turret and sundial were removed from the eastern gable of the nave. In 1884, the bell tower was strengthened, shingled and fitted with a clock.

In 1552 St. Leonard's was recorded as having three bells. In 1884 when the tower was strengthened, Mears and Stainbank of the Whitechapel Bell Foundry recast the three original bells and cast three new ones to make the present ring of six. Saints Leonard & Catherine is now a member of the Dorchester Team Ministry. The Old Rectory, which was sold into private ownership after the Second World War, was designed by the architect John Billing and built in 1862 in the Victorian Gothic style for the new rector the Reverend Arthur Williams and his large family. The first Methodist chapel in Drayton is said to have been built in 1814. It was replaced with a new building on a different site in 1879. The chapel was still used for worship in 1958.

== War memorial ==
The village War Memorial is a sandstone cross, designed by Sir Aston Webb, architect of many well-known buildings including Buckingham Palace and Britannia Royal Naval College, Dartmouth. It was unveiled by Major General Sir Robert Fanshawe KCB, DSO in 1923. The memorial was restored with funds provided by the War Memorials Trust in 2015.

== Secular buildings ==
The oldest secular building in Drayton is a timber-framed barn. Its date is unknown but it is thought to be about 1400. There are at least 15 houses and cottages dating from the 16th and 17th centuries, several of which are thatched. The village has one public house, the Catherine Wheel. Licensing records show that it was a public house by 1841. For a time the village had a second public house, the Three Pigeons. The building is now a private house but retains its pub name. For many years Morrells of Oxford controlled the Catherine Wheel but it is now a free house. The present structure dates from the 1930s, and replaced an earlier building that was destroyed by fire. A National School was completed and opened next to the parish church in 1855. In 1925, it was reorganised as a junior school, with older pupils being schooled in Dorchester. The school was closed in 1947 and is now the village hall.

== Amenities ==
- The village has a small private airstrip. It is suitable only for microlights and STOL aircraft.
- The Aston Martin Heritage Trust Museum is located in the village.

== Gallery ==
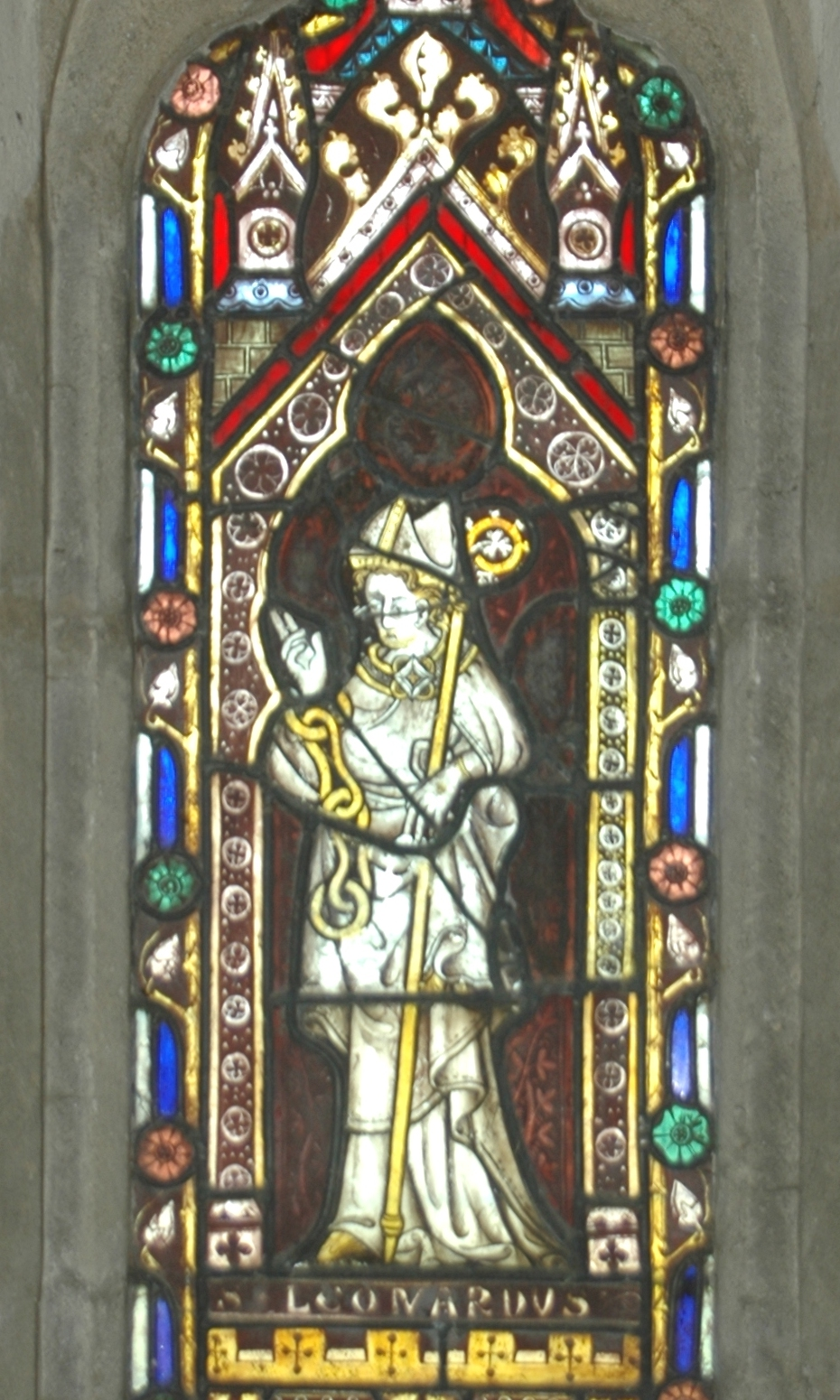
Stained glass of St. Leonard of Noblac in the parish church: mid-14th century, restored in 1859

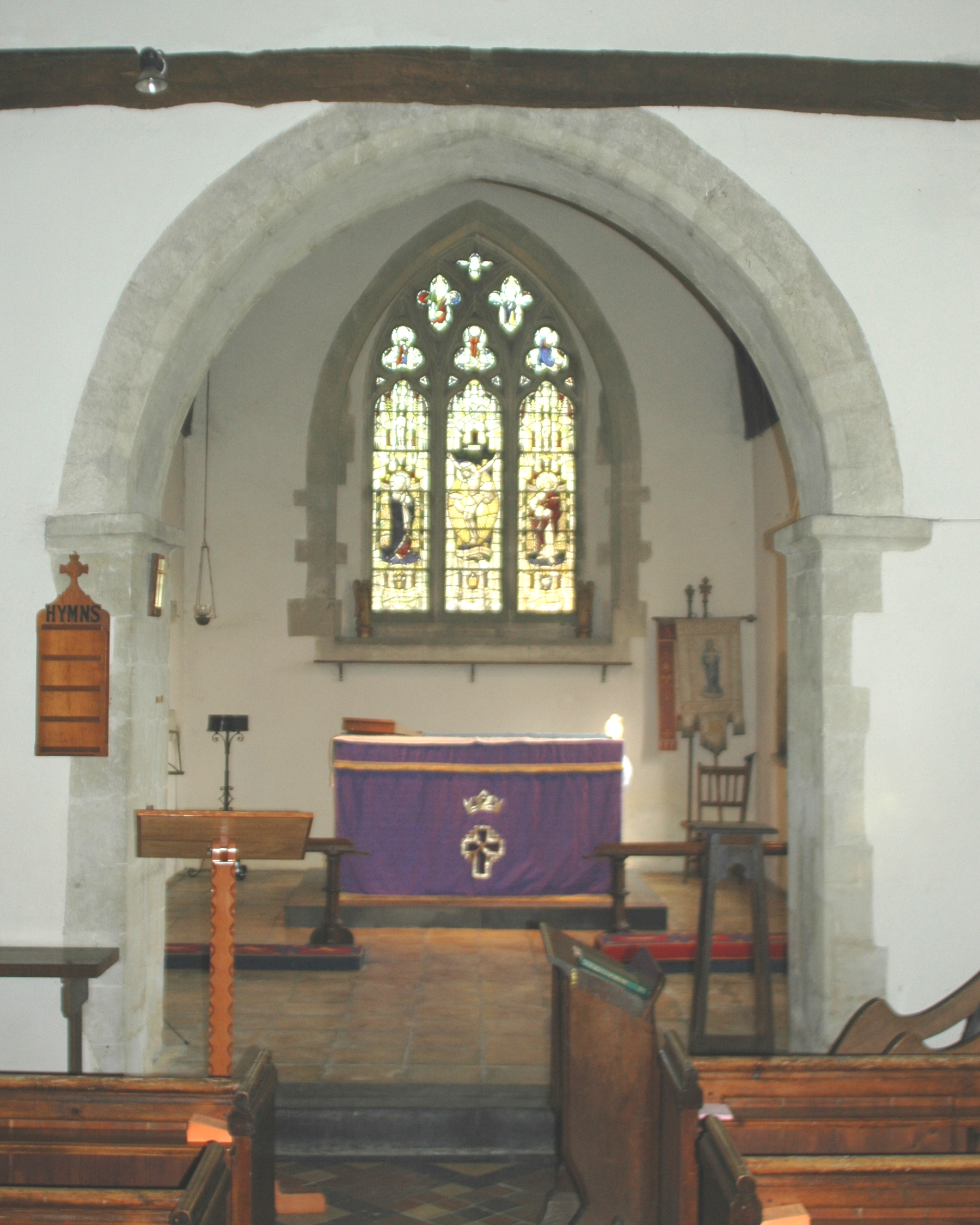
Chancel of St. Leonard & St. Catherine's parish church, showing late 12th-century chancel arch and 1894 east window by Comper & Bucknall

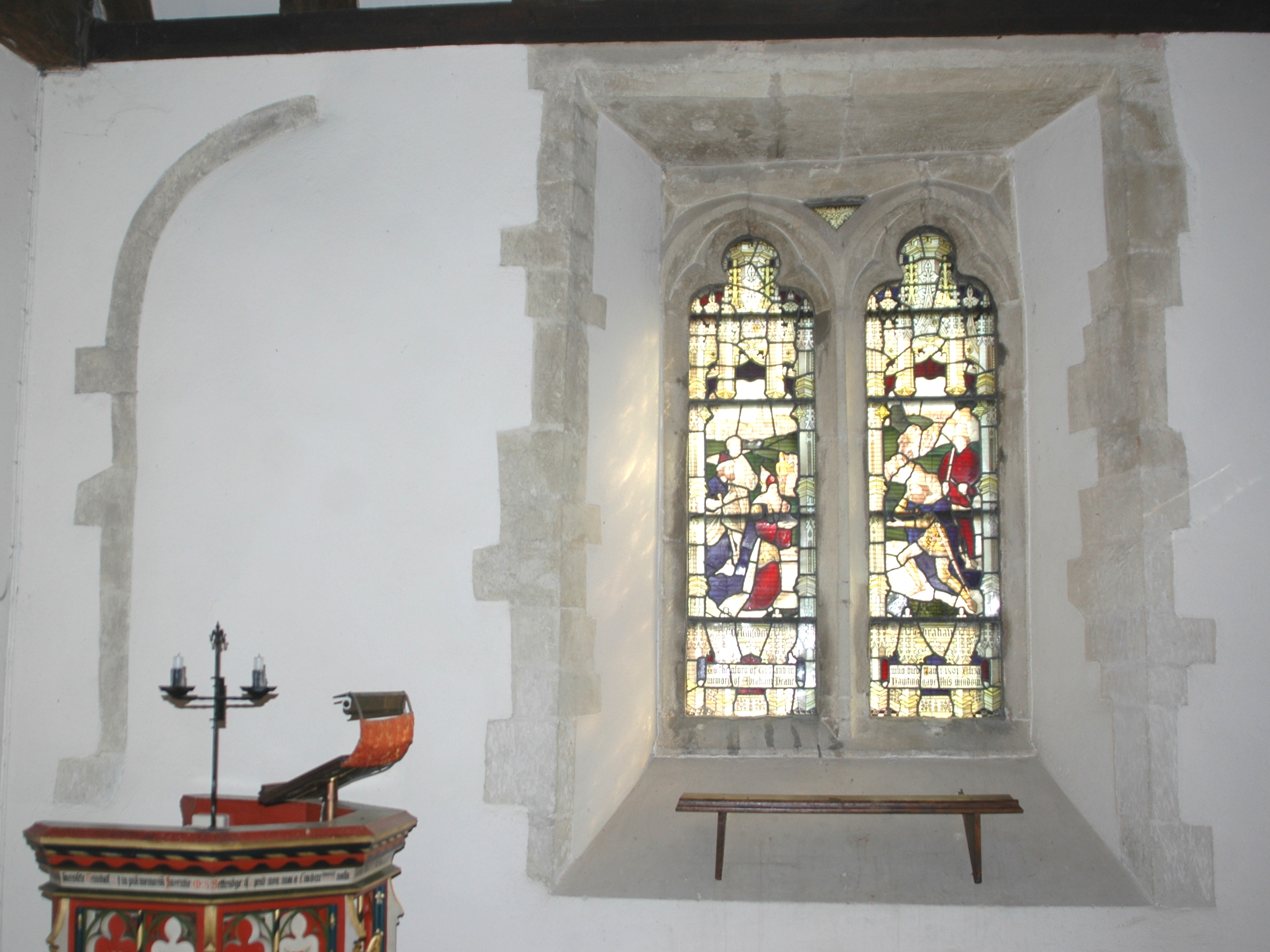
Southeast corner of nave of parish church, showing Perpendicular Gothic window with 1894 glass by Comper & Bucknall and blocked arch of 12th-century window

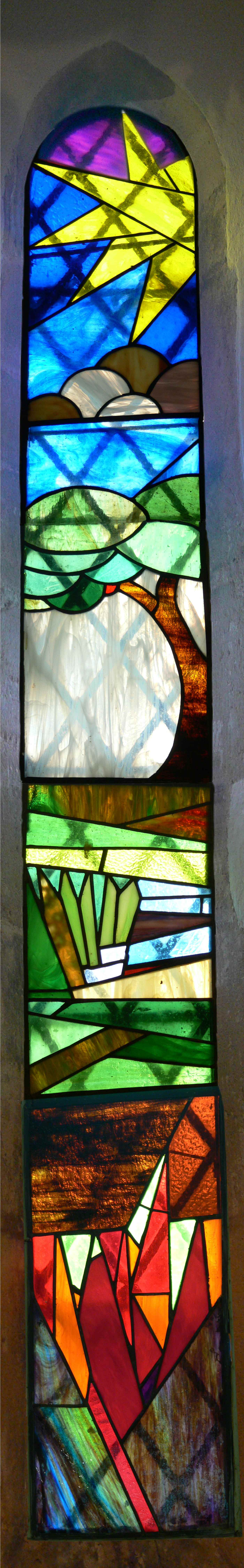
Millennium Window.
A Man That Looks on Glasse.
George Herbert (1593-1633)
Window made by DJW, bell ringer here for 50 years.
To Celebrate the Millennium

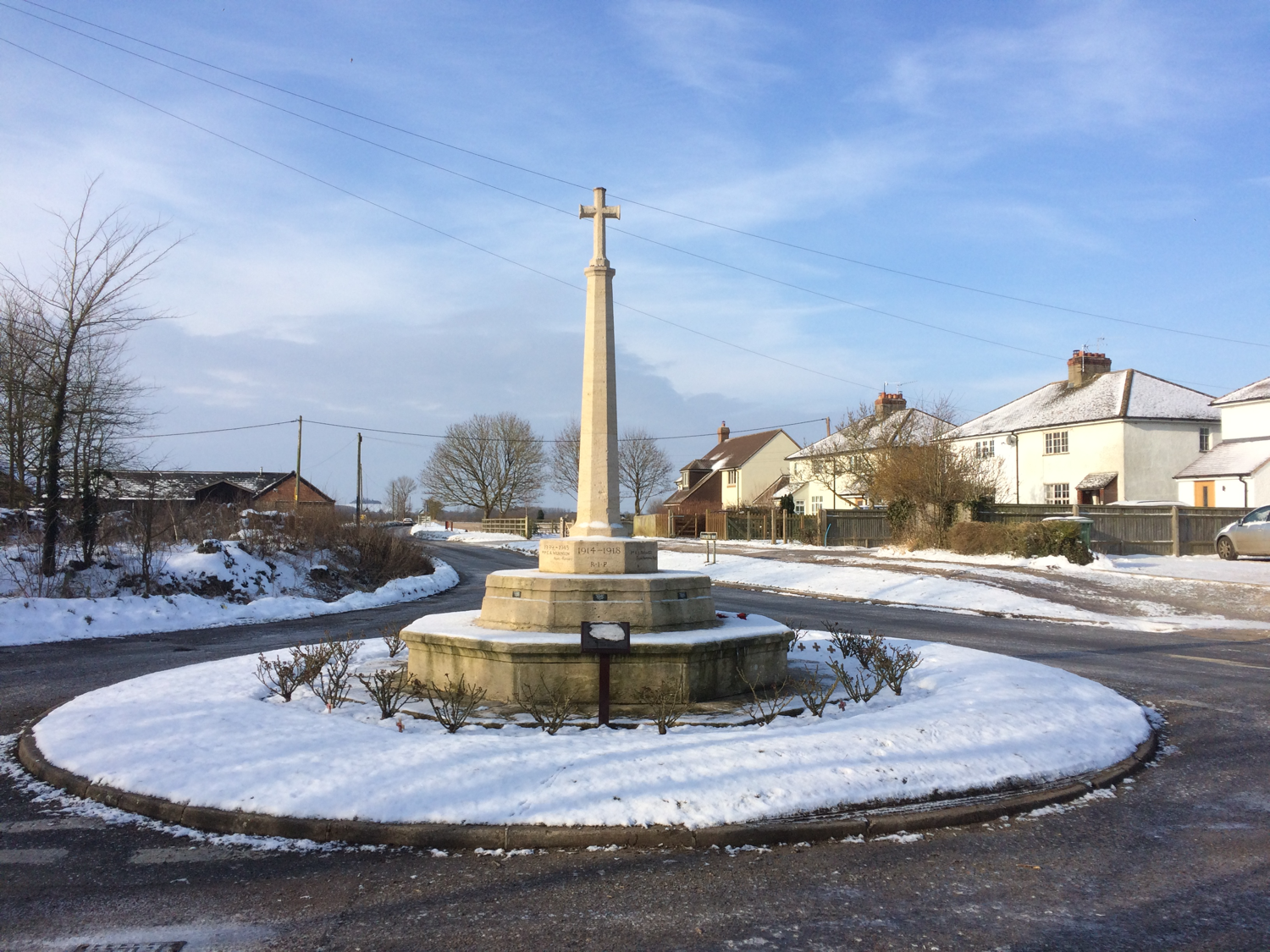
Drayton St Leonard War Memorial

== Sources ==
- Lobel, Mary D, ed. (1964). A History of the County of Oxford: Volume 8: Lewknor and Pyrton Hundreds. Victoria County History. pp. 71–81.
- Sherwood, Jennifer; Pevsner, Nikolaus (1974). Oxfordshire. The Buildings of England. Harmondsworth: Penguin Books. pp. 587–588. ISBN 0-14-071045-0.
