= Aston Martin Heritage Trust Museum =

Automobile museum in Drayton St Leonard, England

Coordinates: 51.6600°N 1.13723°W

The Aston Martin Heritage Trust (AMHT) is a charitable incorporated organisation that manages the Aston Martin Museum, an automobile museum presenting the history of Aston Martin cars. It is located off Dorchester Road in the village of Drayton St Leonard, South Oxfordshire, England.

The AMHT was founded in 1998 and the Museum opened in 2002. It is housed in a 15th-century barn, built by the monks of Dorchester Abbey. The collection ranges from the oldest surviving Aston Martin car, No. 3 to a Vanquish Volante pre-production model dating from 2013.

== See also ==
- List of museums in Oxfordshire
