= International Biotechnology Trust =

British investment trust

- Type: Public company
- Traded as: LSE: IBT; FTSE SmallCap constituent
- Industry: Investment Management
- Founded: 1994; 32 years ago
- Headquarters: London, United Kingdom
- Website: www.schroders.com/en-gb/uk/individual/funds-and-strategies/investment-trusts/international-biotechnology-trust/

International Biotechnology Trust (LSE: IBT) is a British investment trust focused on investments in biotechnology and other life sciences companies. The company is listed on the London Stock Exchange and is a constituent of the FTSE SmallCap Index.

The company's stated investment objective is to achieve long-term capital growth by investing in biotechnology and other life sciences companies. It invests mainly in quoted companies, with a smaller allocation to unquoted investments, and uses the NASDAQ Biotechnology Index as its reference index.

== History ==
The company was launched in 1994 by Rothschild Asset Management, raising £37.7 million against an initial target of £100 million. In 1999, a proposed merger with Biotechnology Investments Limited, another Rothschild-managed fund, did not proceed, and Rothschild withdrew from biotechnology investment. In November 2000, the board appointed Schroder Ventures Life Sciences as investment adviser. The firm was later renamed SV Life Sciences and, in 2017, SV Health Investors.

In 2016, the company introduced a dividend equivalent to 4% of net asset value, paid in two instalments each year, predominantly out of capital.

In February 2023, SV Health Investors gave notice that it would stop managing the company in order to focus on its healthcare venture business. In August 2023, the board selected Schroders as manager following a competitive process. Portfolio managers Ailsa Craig and Marek Poszepczynski, joint lead managers since March 2021, moved to Schroders when the transfer took effect in November 2023.

In October 2025, the company committed £10 million to a partnership with Schroders Capital to invest in unquoted biotechnology funds.
