= Aston Martin Vantage (2005) =

Aston Martin V8 Vantage Aston Martin V12 Vantage
- V12 Vantage S

Overview
- Manufacturer: Aston Martin
- Production: 2005–2017 (V8 Vantage); 2009–2018 (V12 Vantage)
- Model years: 2006–2018
- Assembly: United Kingdom: Gaydon, Warwickshire
- Designer: Henrik Fisker

Body and chassis
- Class: Sports car (S)
- Body style: 2-door coupé 2-door roadster
- Layout: Front mid-engine, rear-wheel-drive
- Platform: VH Generation II
- Doors: Swan doors
- Related: Aston Martin DB9; Aston Martin DBS; Aston Martin V12 Zagato; Aston Martin Rapide; Aston Martin DB10; Aston Martin Vanquish

Powertrain
- Engine: 4.3 L AM05 V8; 4.7 L AM14 V8; 5.9 L AM11 V12 (V12 Vantage); 5.9 L AM28 V12 (V12 Vantage S)
- Transmission: 6-speed Graziano manual 6-speed Sportshift automated manual 7-speed Sportshift II automated manual 7-speed Sportshift III automated manual (V12 Vantage S); 7-speed dog-leg manual (2017 V12 Vantage S only)

Dimensions
- Wheelbase: 2006–2007, 2010–2018: 102.4 in (2,601 mm); 2008–2010: 102.5 in (2,604 mm)
- Length: 172.5 in (4,382 mm); 2011–2018 V12: 172.6 in (4,384 mm)
- Width: 73.5 in (1,867 mm); 2011–2018 V12: 73.4 in (1,864 mm)
- Height: 2006–07: 49.4 in (1,255 mm); Roadster: 2006–07: 50.0 in (1,270 mm); 2008–2010: 49.5 in (1,257 mm); 2011–2018 V8: 49.6 in (1,260 mm); 2011–2018 V12: 49.2 in (1,250 mm)
- Kerb weight: 1,630 kg (3,594 lb) (V8 Vantage); 1,610 kg (3,549 lb) (V8 Vantage S); 1,680 kg (3,704 lb) (V12 Vantage); 1,665 kg (3,671 lb) (V12 Vantage S)

Chronology
- Predecessor: Aston Martin Vantage
- Successor: Aston Martin Vantage (2018)

The Aston Martin Vantage is a series of sports cars from the British automotive manufacturer Aston Martin. Aston Martin has previously used the "Vantage" name on high-performance variants of their existing GT models, notably on the Virage-based car of the 1990s. The modern car, in contrast, is the leanest and most agile car in Aston's lineup. As such, it is intended as a more focused model to reach out to potential buyers of cars such as the Porsche 911 as well as the exotic sports and GT cars with which Aston Martins traditionally compete.

Production of the V8 Vantage ended in 2017 while production of the V12 Vantage continued until 2018. The 2005 Vantage and its variants became the most successful model in Aston Martin's history. Aston Martin unveiled the next-generation Vantage in November 2017, and started its production run the following year.

== Overview ==
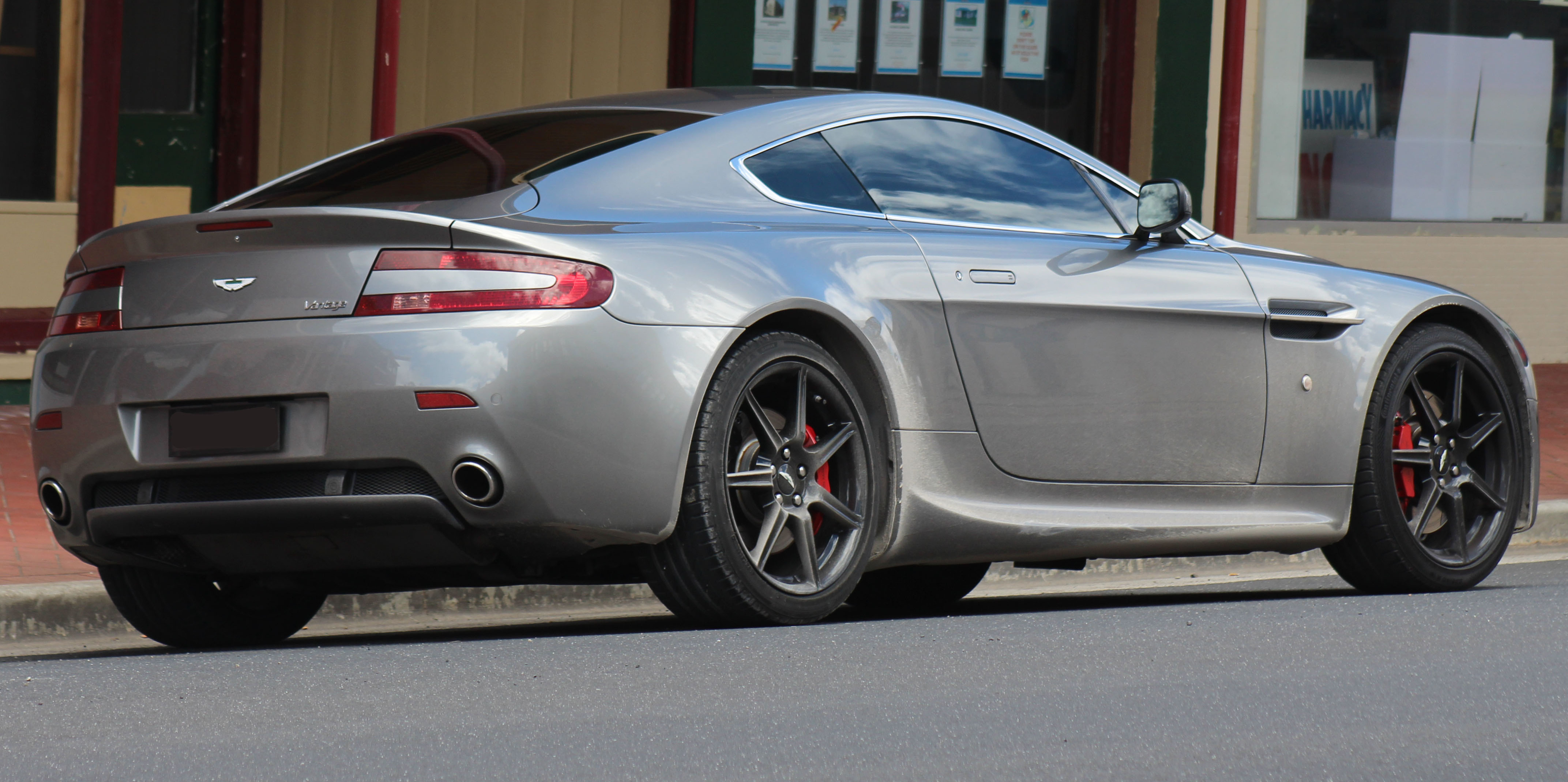
V8 Vantage Coupé (Rear View)

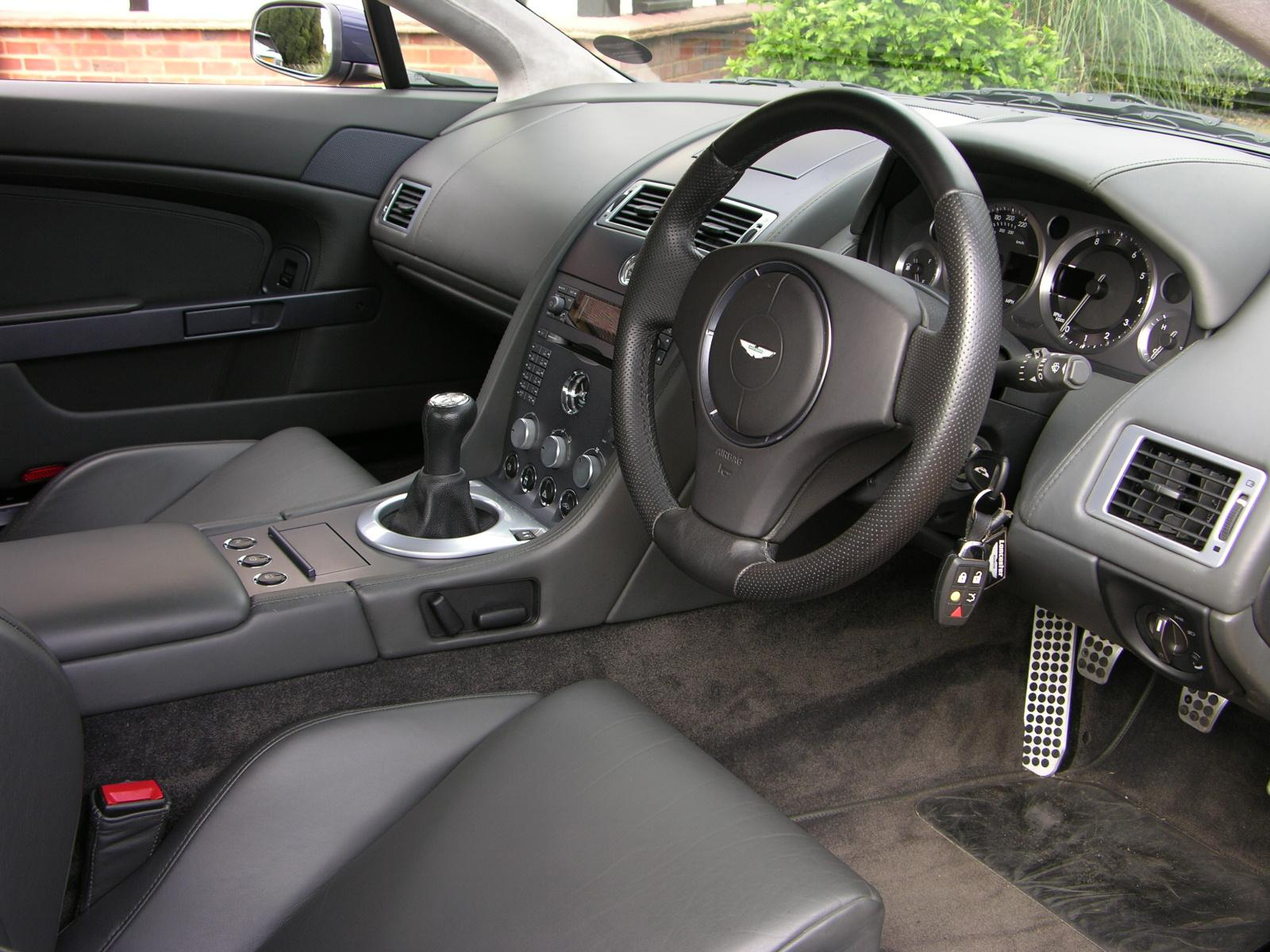
Interior (2006–2009)

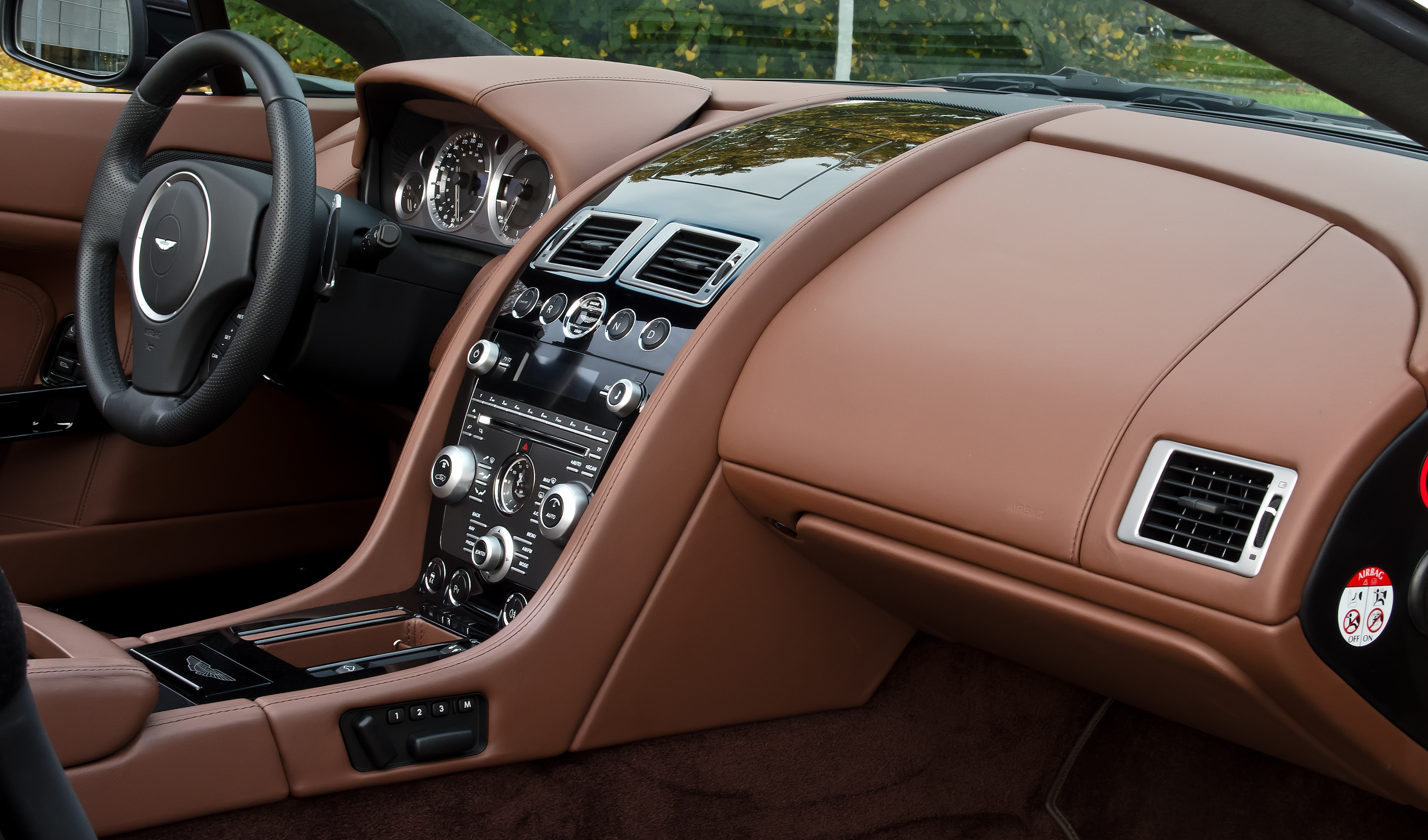
Interior (2009–2017)

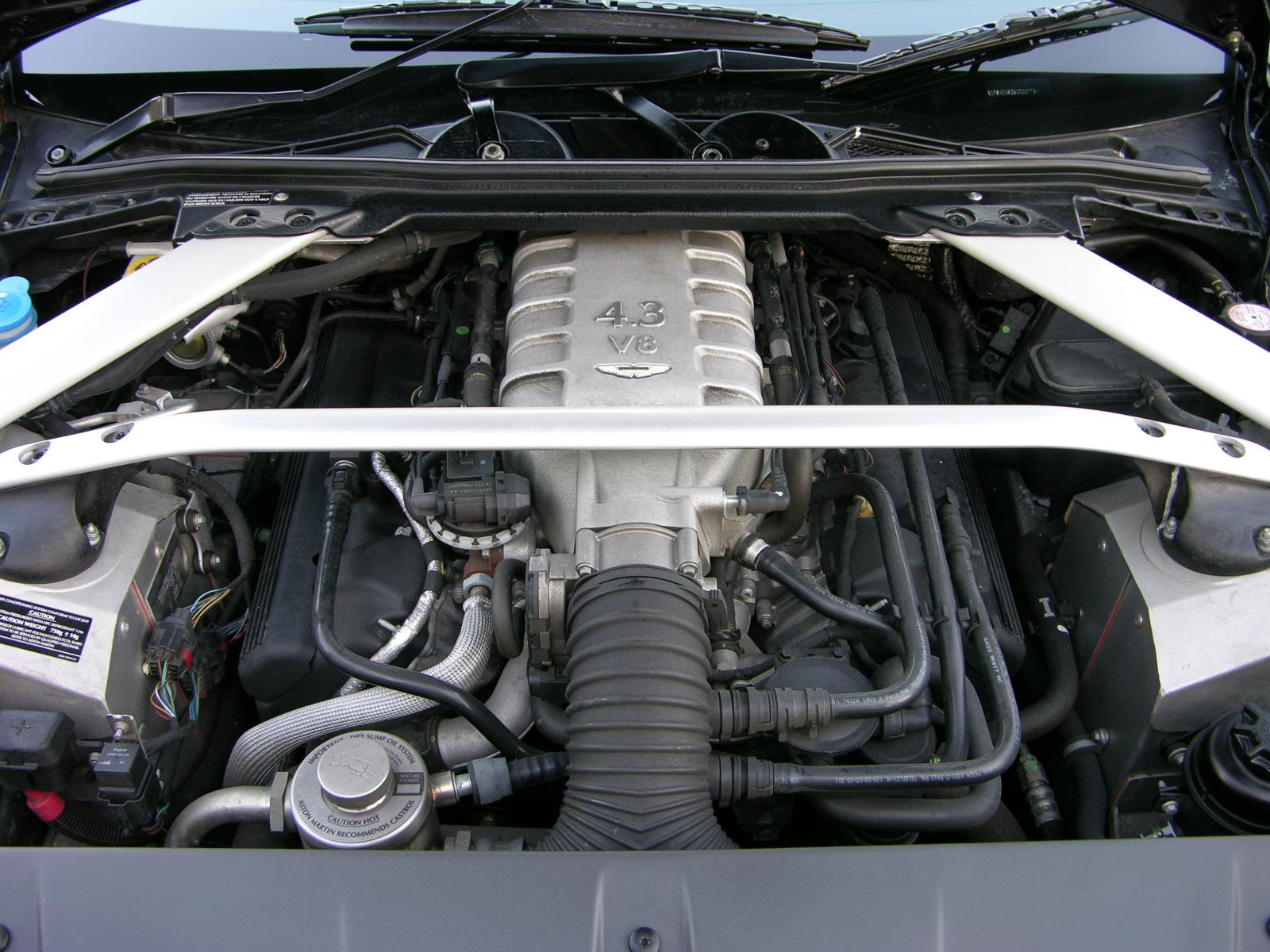
The 4.3 L V8 engine

Following the unveiling of the AMV8 Vantage concept car in 2003 at the North American International Auto Show, the production version, known as the V8 Vantage was introduced at the Geneva Motor Show in 2005 for the 2006 model year. The two-seat, two-door coupé had a bonded aluminium structure for strength and lightness. The 172.5 in (4.38 m) long car featured a hatchback-style tailgate for practicality, with a large luggage shelf behind the seats. In addition to the coupé, a convertible, known as the V8 Vantage Roadster, was introduced later in that year.

The V8 Vantage was initially powered by a 4.3-litre (4,280 cc) quad-cam 32-valve V8 which produced 380 bhp (283 kW; 385 PS) at 7,300 rpm and 410 N⋅m (302 lb⋅ft) at 5,000 rpm. However, models produced after 2008 had a 4.7-litre V8 with 420 bhp (313 kW; 426 PS) and 470 N⋅m (347 lb⋅ft) of torque. Though based loosely on Jaguar's AJ-V8 engine architecture, this engine was unique to Aston Martin and featured race-style dry-sump lubrication, which enabled it to be mounted low in the chassis for an improved centre of gravity. The cylinder block and heads, crankshaft, connecting rods, pistons, camshafts, inlet and exhaust manifolds, lubrication system and engine management were all designed in house by Aston Martin and the engine was assembled by hand at the AM facility in Cologne, Germany, which also built the V12 engine for the DB9 and Vanquish.

The engine was front mid-mounted with a rear-mounted transaxle, giving a 49-51 front/rear weight distribution. Slotted Brembo brakes were also standard. The initial version of the V8 Vantage could accelerate from 0–60 mph (97 km/h) in 4.8 seconds before topping out at 175 mph (282 km/h).

In 2008, Aston Martin introduced an aftermarket dealer approved upgrade package for power and handling of the 4.3-litre variants that maintained the warranty with the company. The power upgrade was called the V8 Vantage Power Upgrade, creating a more potent version of the Aston Martin 4.3-litre V8 engine with an increase in peak power of 20 bhp (15 kW; 20 PS) to 400 bhp (298 kW; 406 PS) while peak torque increased to 420 N⋅m (310 lb⋅ft). This consists of the fitting of the following revised components; manifold assembly (painted Crackle Black), valved air box, right and left-hand side vacuum hose assemblies, engine bay fuse box link lead (ECU to fuse box), throttle body to manifold gasket, intake manifold gasket, fuel injector to manifold seal and a manifold badge.

Aston Martin planned to build up to 3,000 per year. Included was a 6-speed manual transmission and leather-upholstery for the seats, dashboard, steering wheel, and shift-knob. A new 6-speed automated manual transmission, similar to those produced by Ferrari and Lamborghini, called Sportshift was introduced later as an option.

In their 2006 readership survey, readers of Car Design News voted the Aston Martin V8 Vantage as the best current production car design. The survey results were based on over 1,000 responses, most from working automotive designers and students of industrial and automotive design. The Vantage was also voted one of Automobile magazine's 2007 "All-Stars" for its performance, road manners, and design. The V8 Vantage is also one of the only two cars to be added to "The DB9 Section", – a mini-fridge reserved for the super "cool" – on the BBC's Top Gear (on which it is described as the baby Aston to differentiate it from the V12 powered DB9). The programme rates cars from seriously un-cool to sub-zero. The fridge was an extra category added when the presenters deemed the Aston Martin DB9 too cool for the sub-zero category. In the 2005 awards, Jeremy Clarkson declared the V8 Vantage as Best Sounding Car of the Year and The Coolest Car of the Year, while the award winner was actually the Porsche 911.

While the V8 Vantage was never a common car, the success of the model is highlighted by the completion of chassis number 10,000 – a specially ordered Onyx coupé delivered to a customer in the USA – during the first half of 2008. While the production of 10,000 cars is a tiny number by the standards of typical car manufacturers, it was a significant milestone for an Aston Martin – the DB9 being the only other model to have achieved that number. By the end of production in 2017, Aston Martin had produced 15,417 V8 coupés, 6,231 V8 Roadsters, 2,551 V12 Coupés, and 465 V12 Roadsters (363 V12 S Roadsters, 101 V12 Roadsters and 1 V12 GT Roadster). While strong demand for the Vantage contributed to Aston Martin's health during this period, it is equally true that the relatively low production of all Aston Martins means seeing a V8 or V12 from this generation remains a rare treat. For perspective, during the same period, Porsche was producing over 20,000 911s annually and have built more than 1 million 911 variants in total.

Design credit for the original V8 Vantage has been disputed. The design is officially credited to Henrik Fisker, design director of Aston Martin at the time the Vantage was introduced. However, some sources, including Callum himself, claim that Ian Callum, director of design for Jaguar at the time and former director of design at Aston Martin, was responsible for creating a large amount of the design for the Vantage during his time at Aston Martin, before Fisker joined the company. In an interview with Car and Driver, when asked how much of the V8 Vantage was completed under his watch, Callum replies "I would say a good 80 percent. In fact, we started the V-8 first and then shelved it while we did the DB9—that’s why they’re quite similar". Since its launch in 2005, the Vantage series were offered with a wide range of personalisation options, particularly in the interior.

== 2009 Update ==
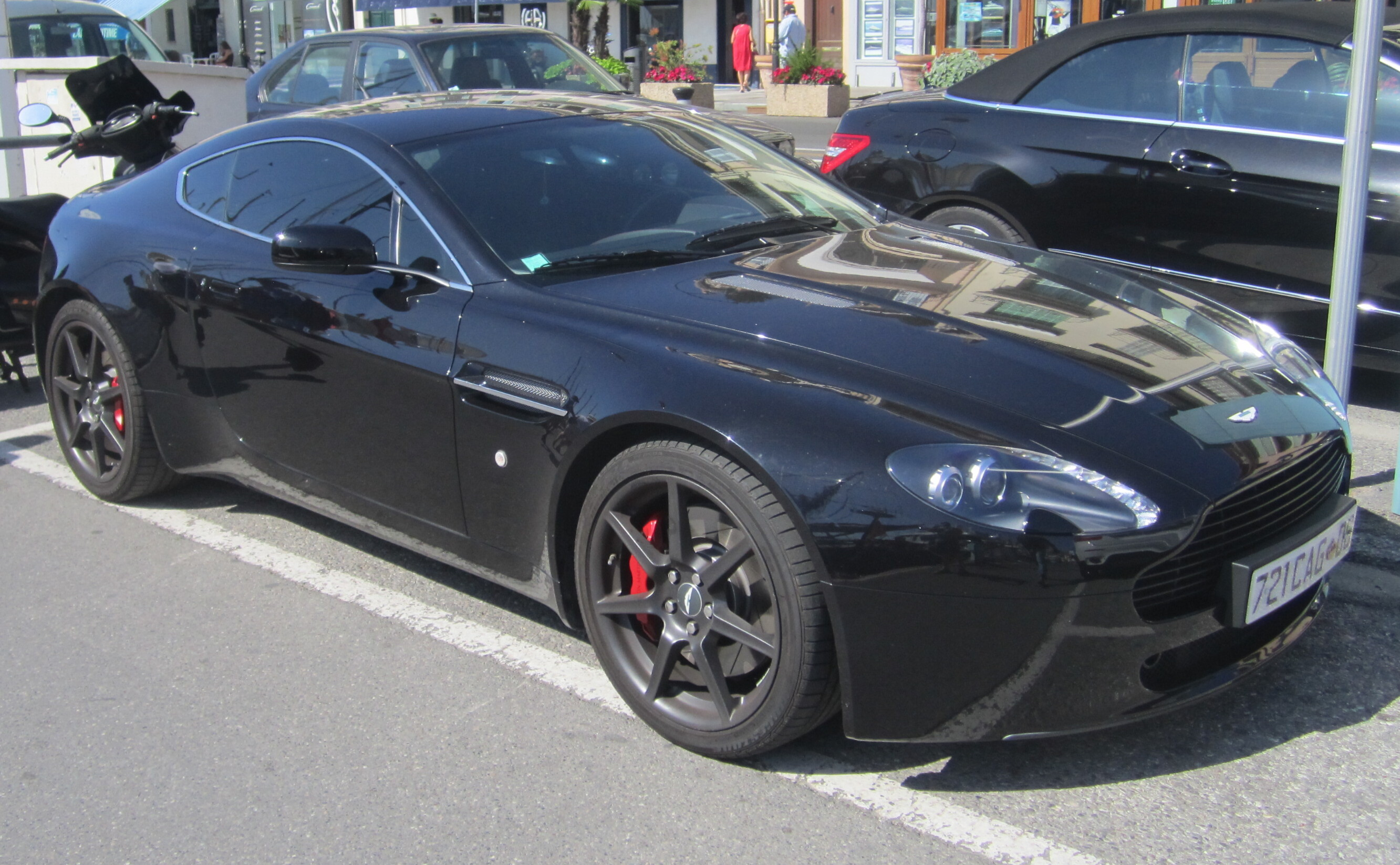
The V8 Vantage after the 2008 updates

In May 2008, Aston Martin announced new technological updates for the Vantage starting in the 2009 model year, which included changes to the engine, transmission, suspension and appearance. New cylinder liners that were now pressed into the aluminium block instead of the original cast-in variants allow a thinner liner, which in turn allows a larger capacity of 4.7-litre. The cylinder bore and stroke was increased from 89 mm (3.5 in) to 91 mm (3.6 in) and 86 mm (3.4 in) to 91 mm (3.6 in) respectively, giving a total displacement of 4,735 cc. The dry sump lubrication system was also modified.

The "Sportshift" automated manual transmission benefited from a software update, while a lightened flywheel was introduced for both the manual and the Sportshift versions. Aston Martin also stiffened the suspension and updated them to use Bilstein dampers. An optional sports pack was offered with stiffer springs for better handling and all-new 5-spoke alloy wheels. Sportshift-equipped models also received a new dual throttle mapping update which allows the driver to choose from the default sport mode or comfort mode, meant to provide more comfortable shifts and throttle input for drivability. Combined European fuel economy and CO_{2} emissions were also improved by 13%.

New wheels were also part of the update including 20-spoke alloy wheels and new 5-spoke aluminium wheels for the sports pack. The interior changed slightly, using an updated console similar to the Aston Martin DBS and the DB9.

The update provided the Vantage with a power increase to 420 bhp (313 kW; 426 PS) at 7,000 rpm (an 11% increase) and a peak torque of 470 N⋅m (347 lb⋅ft) at 5,750 rpm (a 15% increase), providing the car with additional reserves of mid-range performance. Following the updates, the Vantage is able to accelerate from 0 to 60 mph (97 km/h) in 4.7 seconds and reach a higher top speed of 180 mph (290 km/h). In a road test conducted by Car and Driver, the Vantage accelerated from 0 to 60 mph (97 km/h) in 4.3 seconds and ran the quarter mile in 12.7 seconds at a speed of 180 km/h (112 mph).

As part of a mid-year refresh of the 2012 model year (designated MY2012.25 internally), Aston Martin replaced the 6-speed Sportshift with the 7-speed Sportshift II first utilised in the V8 Vantage S. It also received upgraded six-piston front brake calipers, and updated front and rear styling, both of which originally debuted on the S trim.

Through the course of its production run, Aston Martin made 28 variants of the Vantage which are:

- V8 Vantage Coupé
- V8 Vantage Roadster
- V8 Vantage S Coupé
- V8 Vantage S Roadster
- V8 Vantage N400 Coupé
- V8 Vantage N400 Roadster
- V8 Vantage N420 Coupé
- V8 Vantage N420 Roadster
- V8 Vantage N430 Coupé (Europe only)
- V8 Vantage N430 Roadster (Europe only)
- V8 Vantage GT Coupé (USA and Australia only)
- V8 Vantage GT Roadster (USA and Australia only)
- V12 Vantage Coupé
- V12 Vantage Roadster (Europe only)
- V12 Vantage S Coupé
- V12 Vantage S Roadster
- Vantage GT12 Coupé
- Vantage GT12 Roadster
- Vantage GT8
- Vantage GTS Coupé (USA only)
- Vantage GTS Roadster (USA only)
- V8 Vantage AMR Coupé
- V12 Vantage AMR Coupé
- V8 Vantage AMR Roadster
- V12 Vantage AMR Roadster
- Vantage AMR Pro
- Vantage V600 Coupé
- Vantage V600 Roadster

== V8 Vantage variants ==
=== Roadster (2006–2017) ===
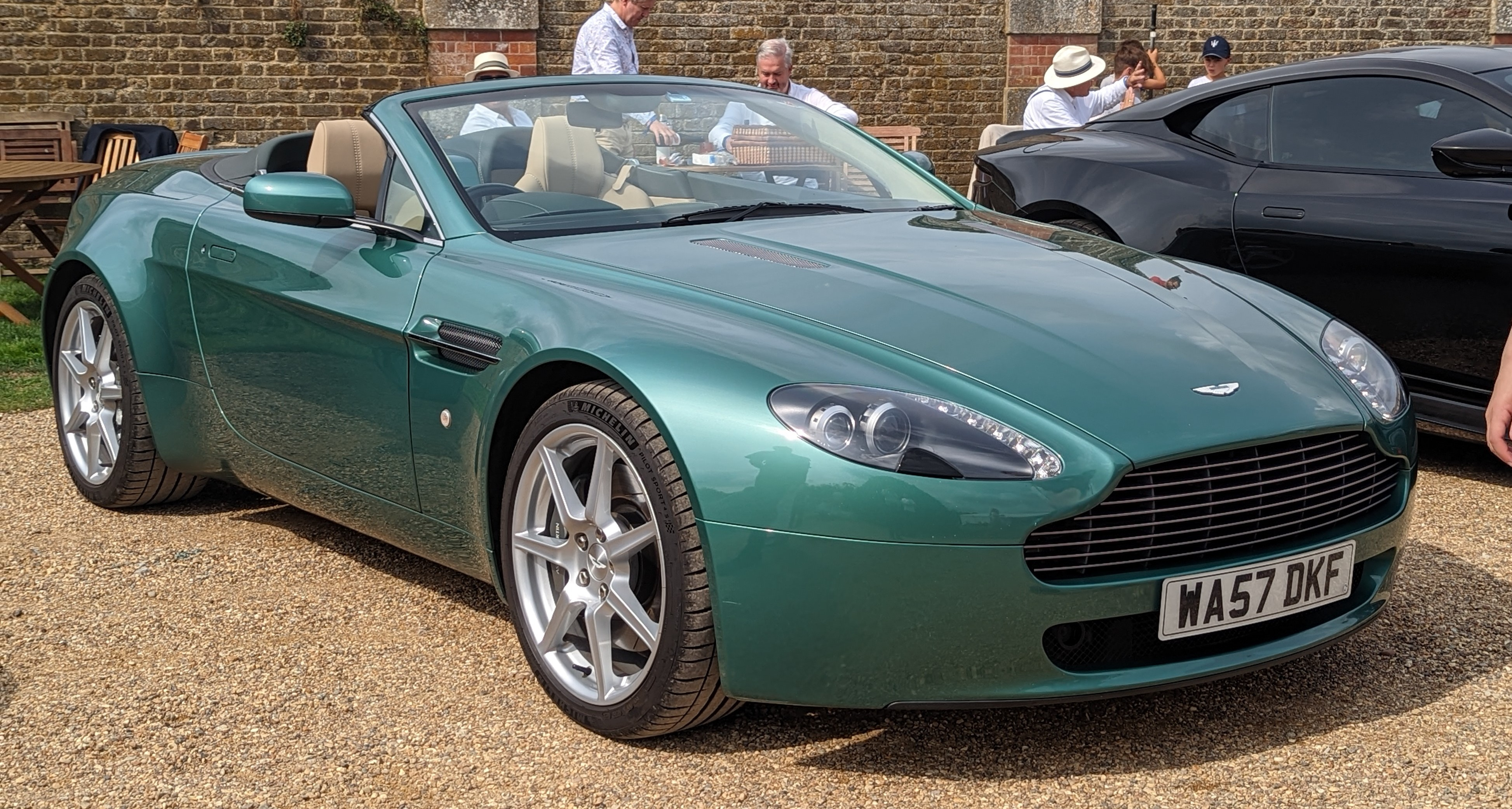
Aston Martin V8 Vantage Roadster (Pre-Update)

At the 2006 Greater Los Angeles Auto Show, Aston Martin officially unveiled the V8 Vantage Roadster. With a kerb weight of 1,710 kg (3,770 lb) the Roadster is 80 kg (176 lb) heavier than the coupé, but Aston Martin claimed both cars would have identical performance. To compensate for the loss of the roof a new, super-stiff cross-member was added to the frame. The soft top could be raised or lowered electronically in 18 seconds and could be operated at speeds up to 30 mph (48 km/h). It had the same 4.3-litre V8 from the coupé version producing 380 bhp (283 kW; 385 PS) at 7,000 rpm and 302 lb⋅ft (409 N⋅m) of torque at 5,000 rpm along with having a maximum speed of 175 mph (282 km/h). It would accelerate from 0 to 60 mph (97 km/h) in 4.9 seconds. The 2009 Vantage Roadster features swan wing doors, a leather and alcantara interior and a zinc alloy centre console and a crystal-capped key fob. It also featured the updated 4.7-litre V8 which produces 420 bhp (313 kW; 426 PS) and 470 N⋅m (347 lb⋅ft) of torque, and can accelerate from 0 to 60 mph (97 km/h) in 4.7 seconds before reaching a top speed of 180 mph (290 km/h). When fitted with the Sportshift transmission, the Vantage Roadster accelerates from 0 to 60 mph (97 km/h) in 4.9 seconds, and has a kerb weight of 1,750 kg (3,858 lb).

=== Prodrive V8 Vantage (2007) ===
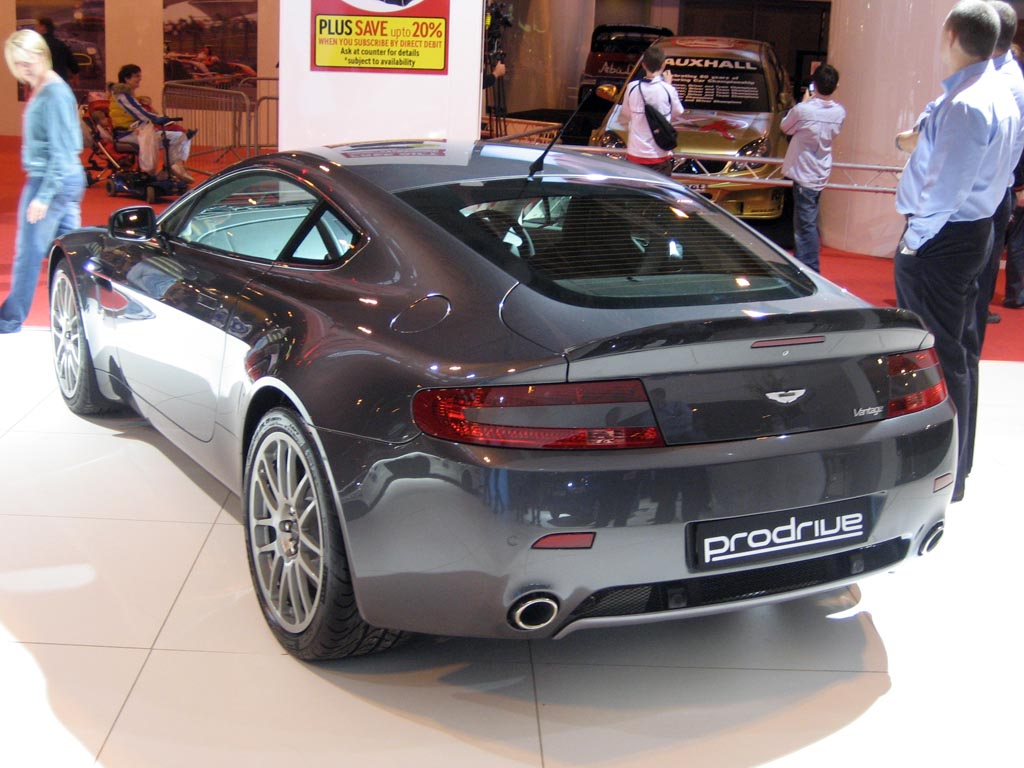
Prodrive V8 Vantage, featuring a larger rear lip spoiler

In 2007, Prodrive released a tuning package for the V8 Vantage, which consists of four separate packages that can be installed in stages. These four packages are for the engine, suspension, wheels, and aerodynamics.

The engine package includes an engine control unit remapping and minor engine modifications that increase power on the 4.3-litre engine by 45 hp (34 kW), and torque by 25 lb⋅ft (34 N⋅m). Throttle control is also remapped. Also included is an exhaust modification which allows the driver to leave the by-pass valves in three separate settings. The suspension package replaces portions of the car's suspension system with Bilstein and Eibach parts, which are claimed to make the vehicle more responsive and accurate through the corners.

The tyre and wheel package replaces the stock wheels with lighter twin-7 spoke alloys from Prodrive Japan. The wheels are similar to those on the DBR9, and each wheel weighs 2.5 kg (6 lb) less than their stock counterpart. Pirelli P-Zero tyres are used, and the rear wheels are widened to 10 inches (254 mm). The aerodynamic package adds a carbon fibre front splitter and rear lip spoiler, which together reduce lift by up to 45%.

Packages could be ordered direct from Prodrive or from an Aston Martin dealer, though all packages are installed by Prodrive. 0 to 60 mph (97 km/h) acceleration times are claimed to drop by 0.5 seconds to about 4.3 seconds and 0-100 mph (161 km/h) times are improved by 0.9 seconds.

=== N400 / N400 Roadster (2007) ===
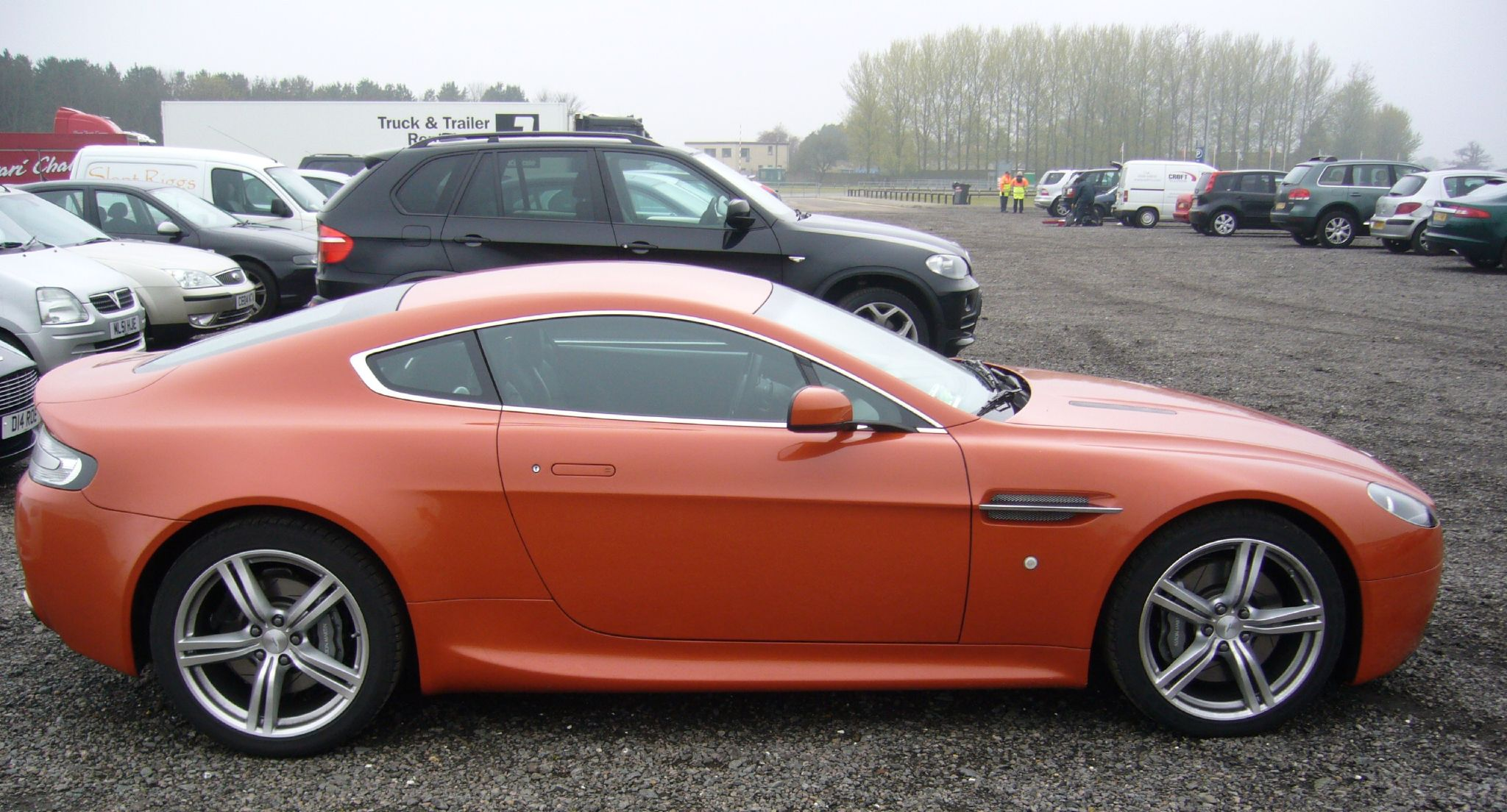
Aston Martin Vantage N400

To commemorate the company's racing successes at the Nürburgring, Aston Martin released the limited edition N400 at the 2007 Frankfurt Motor Show. The N400s 4.3-litre V8 was tuned to produce 400 bhp (298 kW; 406 PS) hence the name, and the car also featured a sports pack which included lightweight graphite-finished wheels, uprated springs and dampers and a new rear anti-roll bar. The N400 was available in three special paint colours; Bergwerk Black, Lightning Silver and Karussell Orange. Each N400 came with perforated leather trim, including a map of the Nürburgring stitched on the center armrest, and a numbered plaque.

Aston Martin tested the car at the Nurburgring Nordschleife circuit where it was able to complete a lap in under eight minutes. The N400 package was available as either a coupé or Roadster with a total of 480 examples (240 Coupés, 240 Roadsters) being built, in note of the fact that there are 480 seconds in 8 minutes.

=== N420 / N420 Roadster (2010) ===
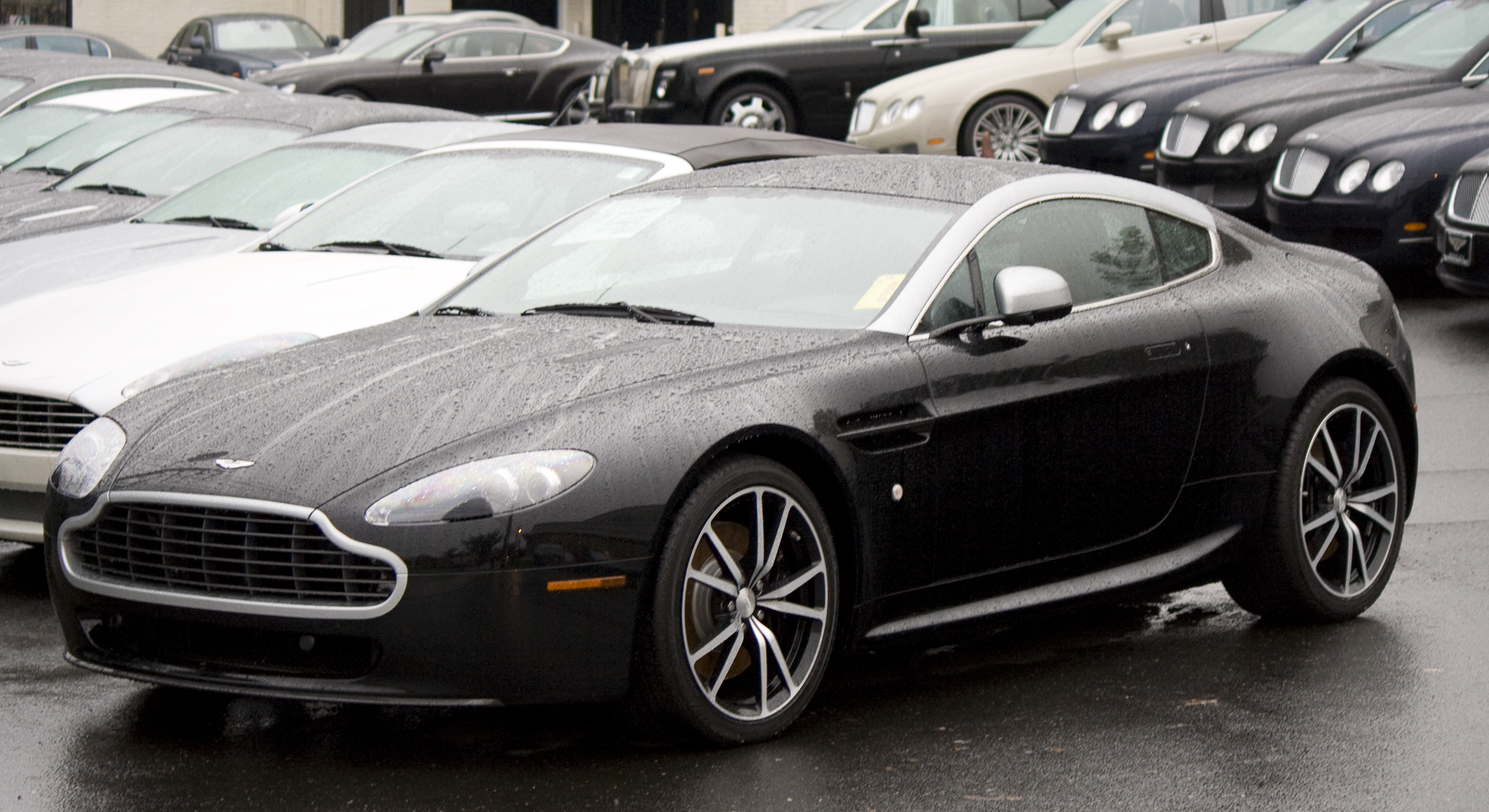
Aston Martin Vantage N420

The N420 became the successor to the special edition N400 of 2007, based upon the standard 4.7-litre V8 Vantage and available either a coupé or roadster and with either the 6-speed manual or optional 6-speed Sportshift transmission. The motorsport-inspired V8 Vantage N420 came with the Sports Pack suspension as standard, a new sports exhaust system, and many carbon-fibre components which resulted in a 27 kg (60 lb) weight saving over the standard car. In addition, the N420 has distinctive Aston Martin 'Race Collection' paint schemes available as an option although any other colour could be specified. Along with that, the N420 has the extended N400 sills, a carbon-fibre front splitter, side strakes, and diffuser along with 10-spoke diamond turned alloy wheels with gloss black finish, black mesh vents, and 'Graphitic' tailpipe finishers. The N420 was available as either a coupé or Roadster.

=== V8 Vantage S / V8 S Roadster (2011–2017) ===
On 25 January 2011, Aston Martin unveiled the V8 Vantage S, a more potent version of the V8 Vantage available in both coupé and Roadster body styles and designed to create a more sporty experience than the standard V8 Vantage. The engine is the same 4.7-litre AJ37 V8 found in the base Vantage. The 4.7-litre V8 engine has been modified to deliver a peak power of 430 bhp (321 kW; 436 PS) at 7,300 rpm and torque of 490 N⋅m (361 lb⋅ft) at 5,000 rpm representing an increase of 10 bhp and 20 Nm respectively. The modifications allowed for improved acceleration time of 0 to 60 mph (97 km/h) in 4.5 seconds and a top speed of 189 mph (304 km/h) for both the coupé and Roadster. Bushings, springs, and dampers were stiffened for the S model and the steering rack is quicker than in the base model. The aerodynamic enhancements include a deeper front bumper with carbon fibre splitter, larger side sills, a carbon fibre diffuser and a larger tailgate lip designed to sharpen the handling on the road. Additional visual differences include new wheels.

A major difference in the Vantage S is the inclusion of the Sportshift II transmission, a 7-speed automated manual gearbox, as standard. The Sportshift II is 24 kg (53 lb) lighter than the 6-speed Sportshift fitted on the standard Vantage. This contributes, along with other weight-saving parts, to a total vehicle kerb weight of 1,610 kg (3,549 lb).

Later in 2013, a special model was unveiled named the SP10 as a celebration of Aston Martin's success in the Nürburgring 24-hour endurance race. Available as both in coupé and roadster body style, the SP10 features the same 4.7-litre V8 engine developing 430 bhp (321 kW; 436 PS) and 490 N⋅m (361 lb⋅ft) of torque. The car remains almost identical to the V8 Vantage S but includes a 6-speed manual transmission as standard with the Sportshift II transmission available as an option. Other bespoke features included a special Ceramic Grey body colour with the soft top of the roadster in Titan Grey, 19-inch cast aluminium wheels with V-shaped spokes finished in high gloss black colour with black brake callipers, a front splitter and rear diffuser made from carbon fibre and clear tail lamps.

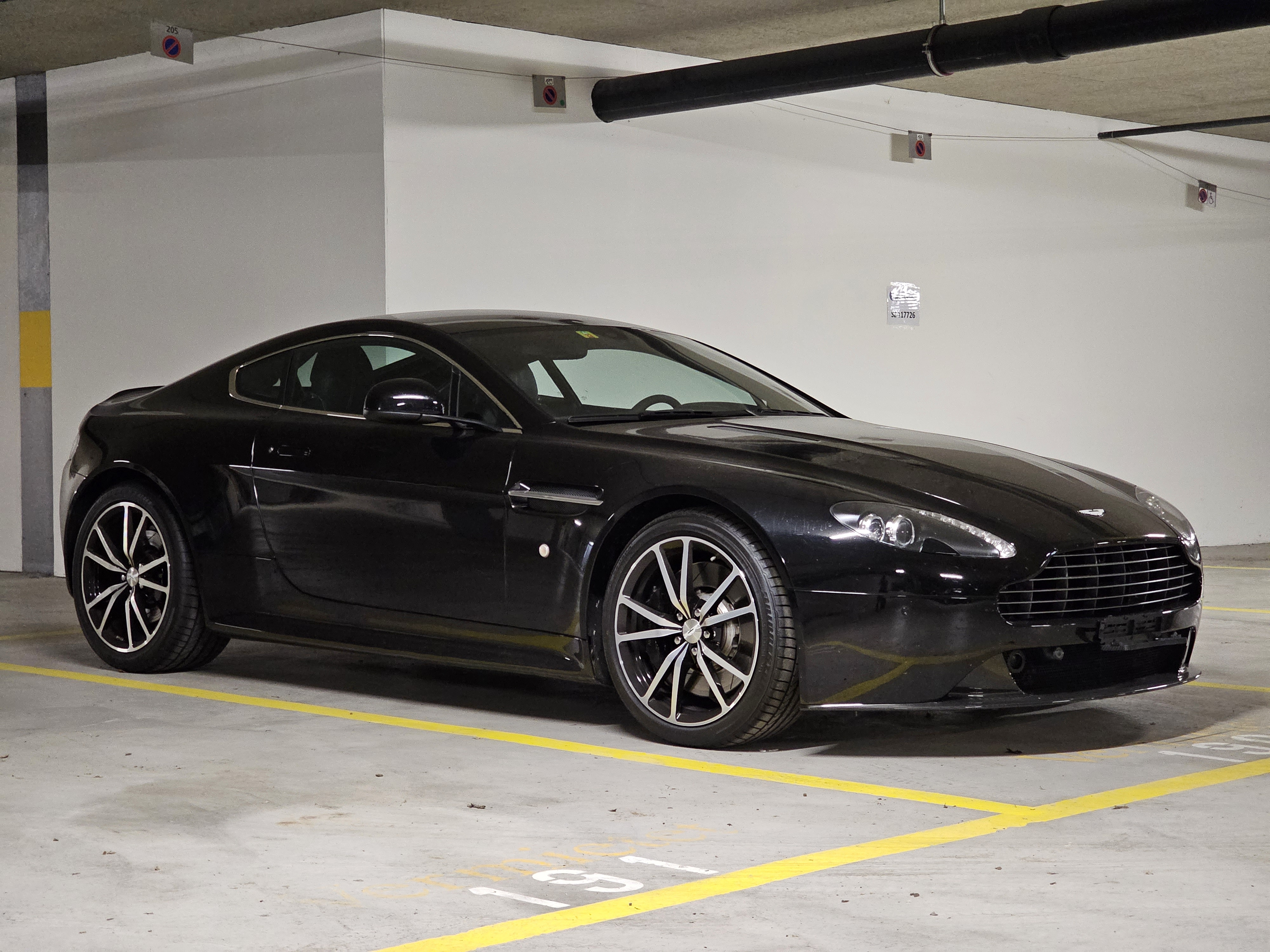
Aston Martin Vantage V8 S

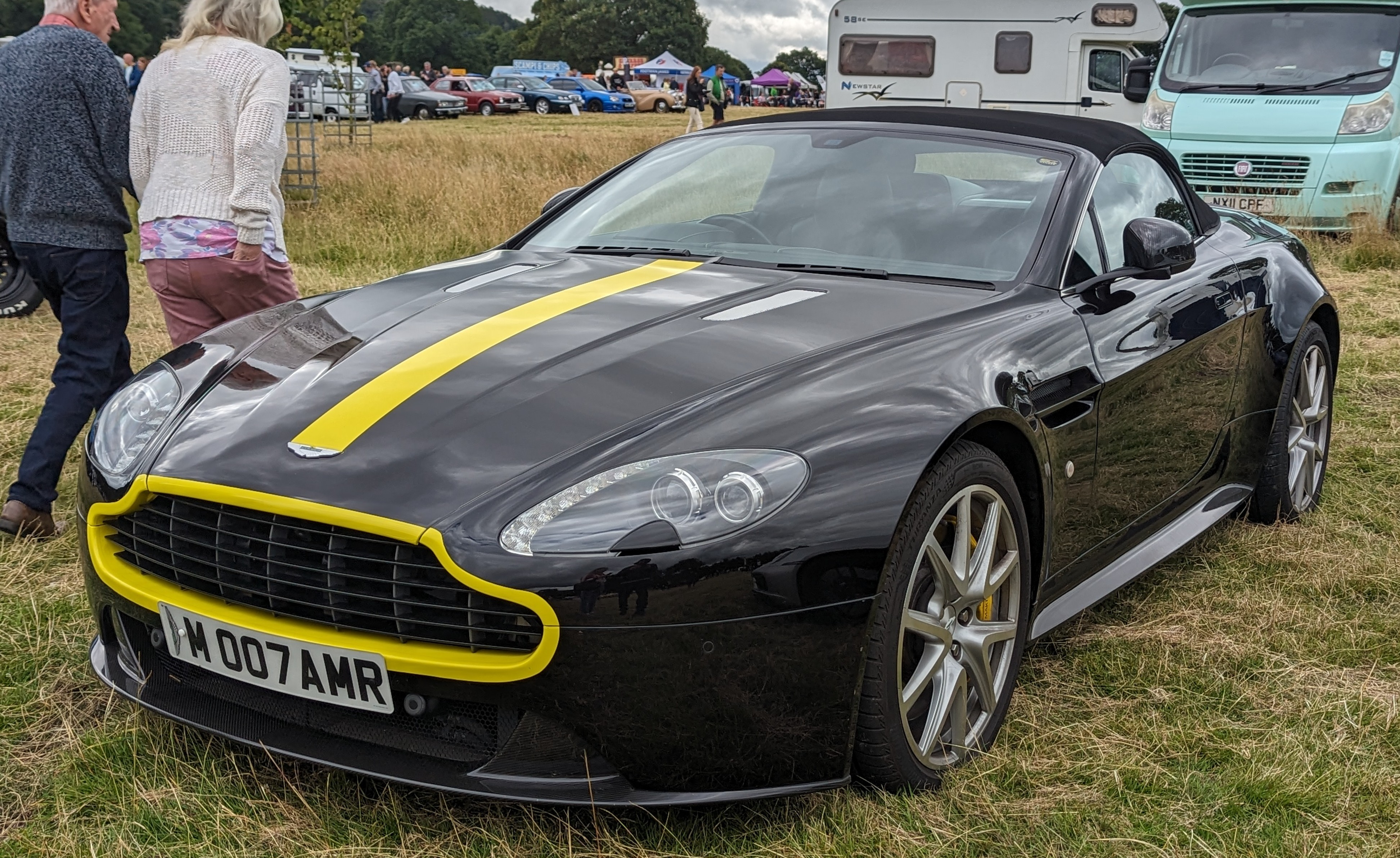
Aston Martin Vantage V8 S Roadster

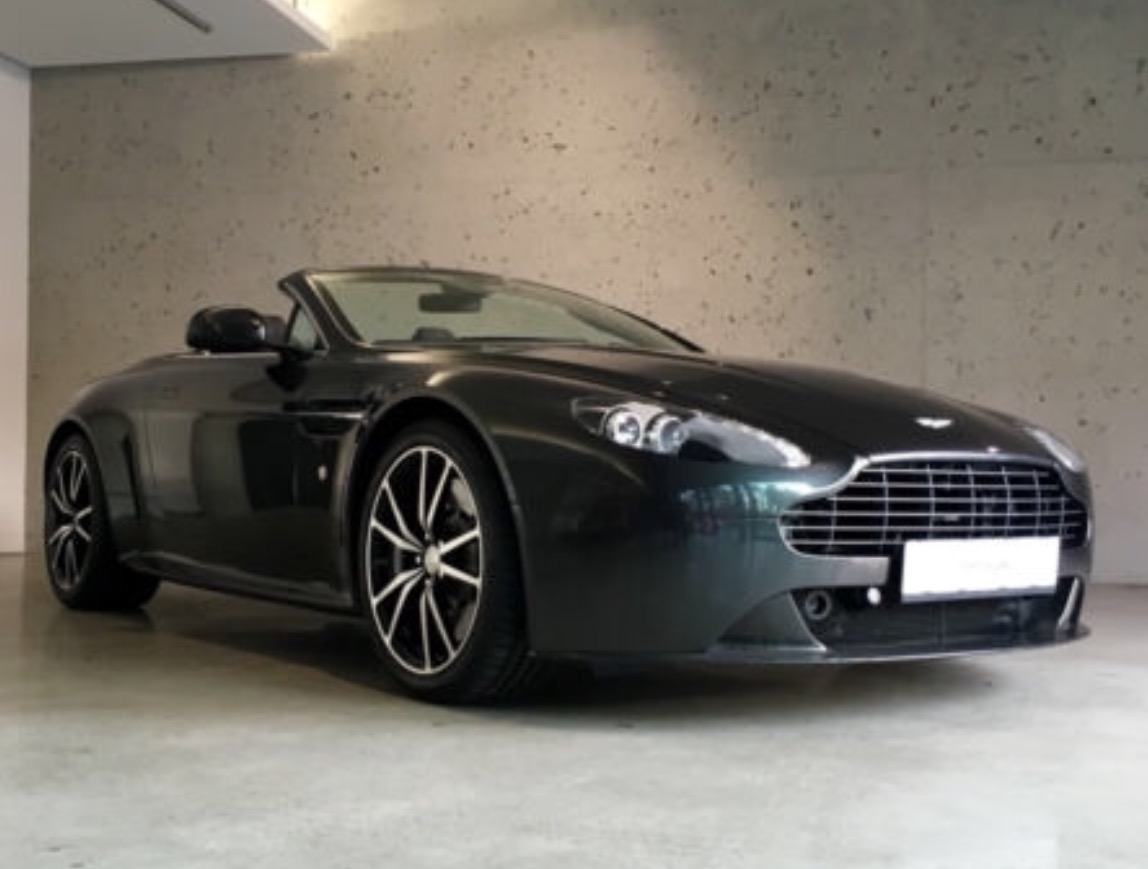
Aston Martin Vantage SP10 Roadster

=== N430 / N430 Roadster (2015) ===
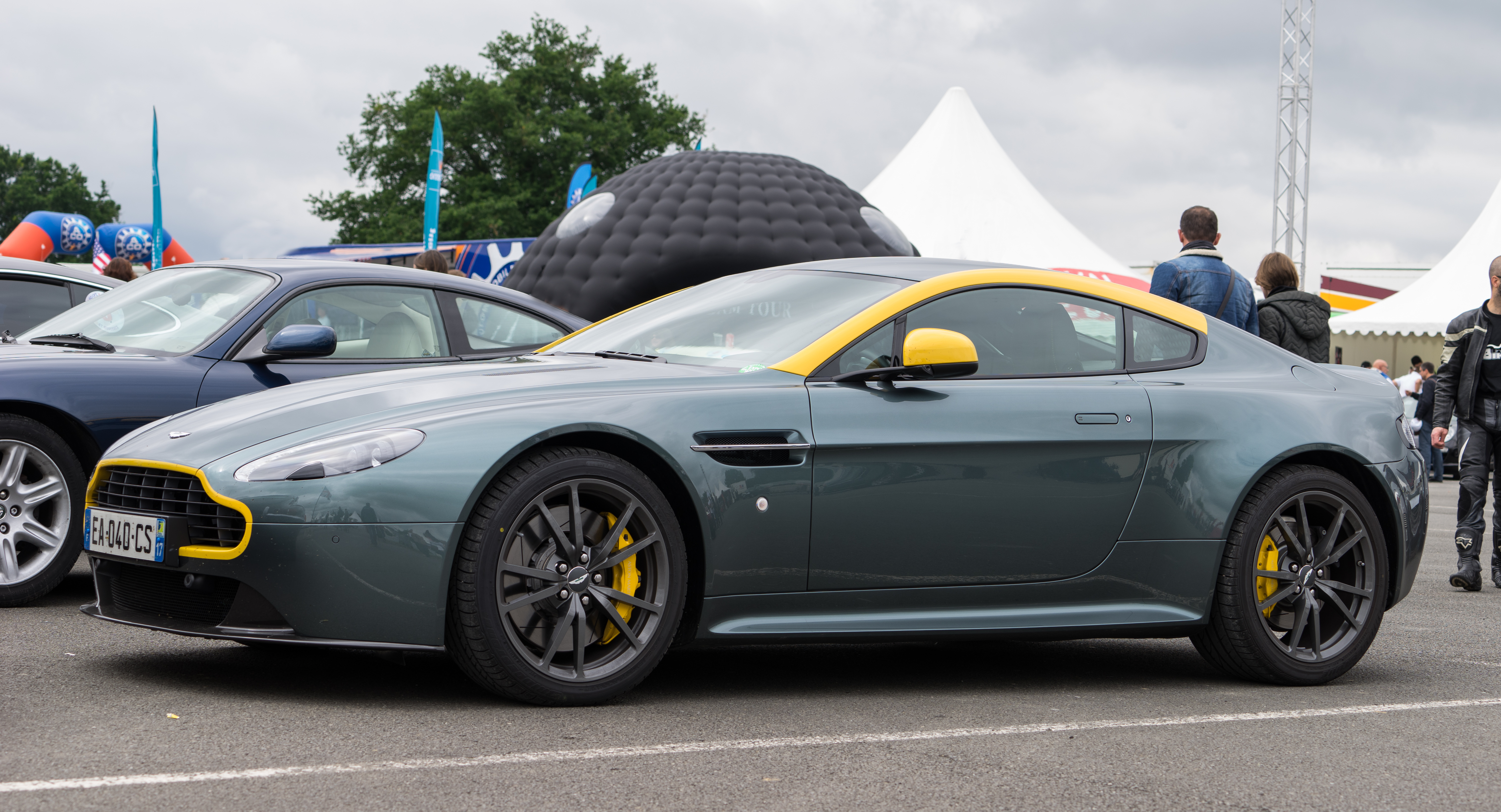
Aston Martin Vantage N430

The N430 version of the V8 Vantage was announced just a few weeks ahead of the 2014 Geneva Motor Show, following on from the previous and desirable N400 and N420 editions. This new model is mechanically based on the standard V8 Vantage but with the addition of the 'S' 430 bhp V8 engine, 'S' suspension and some unique styling features, together with either the regular 6-speed manual or the Prodrive developed 7-speed Sportshift II transmission with paddle shift. The N430 was available in both coupé and Roadster body styles.

=== GT / GT Roadster (2015) ===
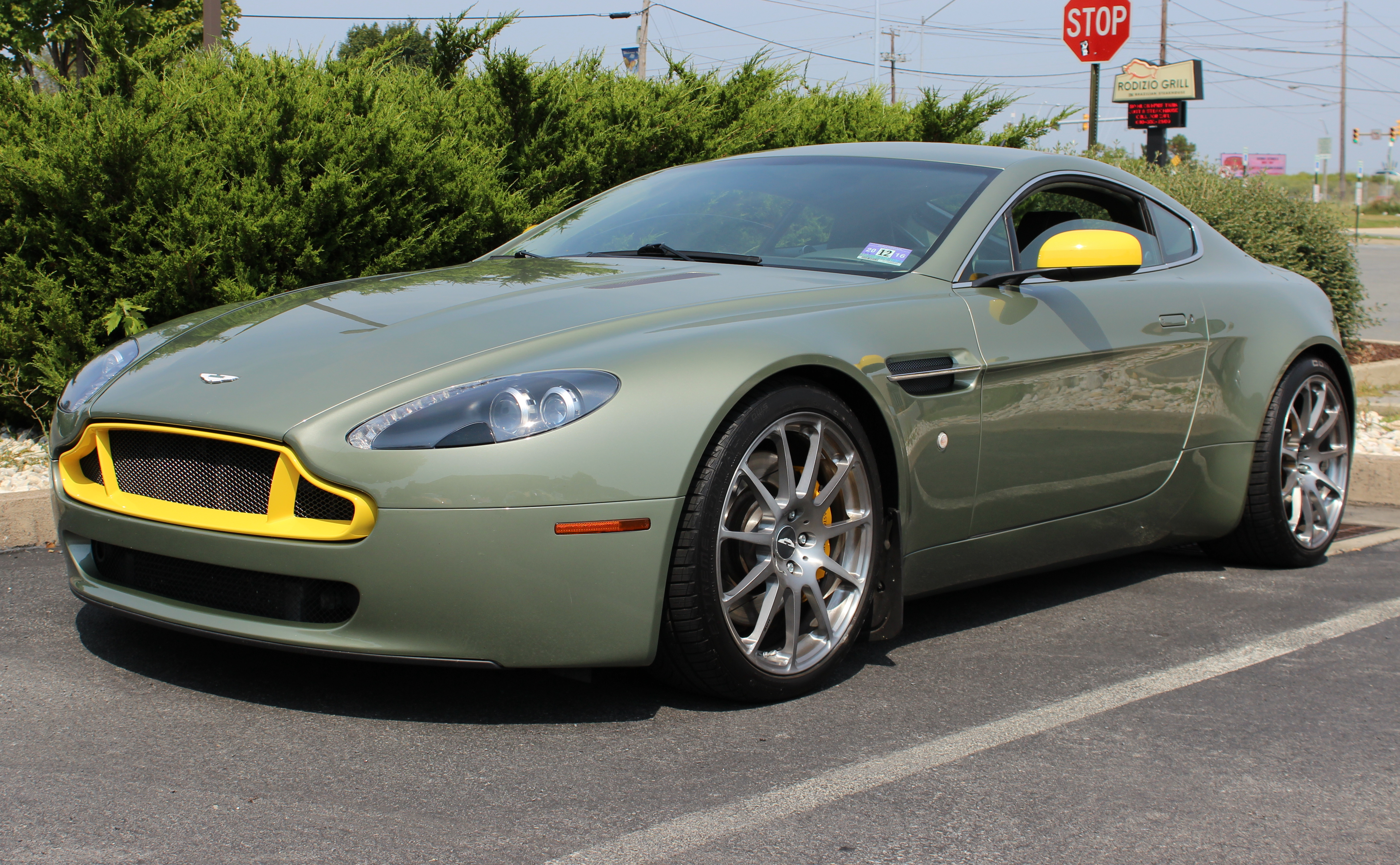
Aston Martin V8 Vantage GT Coupé

Announced on the eve of the New York Auto Show in April 2014, the V8 Vantage GT is what is in effect, the US version of the Vantage N430. This new North American and Australian-only model is mechanically based on the standard V8 Vantage but with the addition of the 'S' 430 bhp engine, 'S' suspension and some unique styling features, together with either the regular 6-speed manual or the Prodrive developed 7-speed Sportshift II transmission with paddle shift. The GT was available as either a coupé or roadster.

=== GTS / GTS Roadster (2016) ===
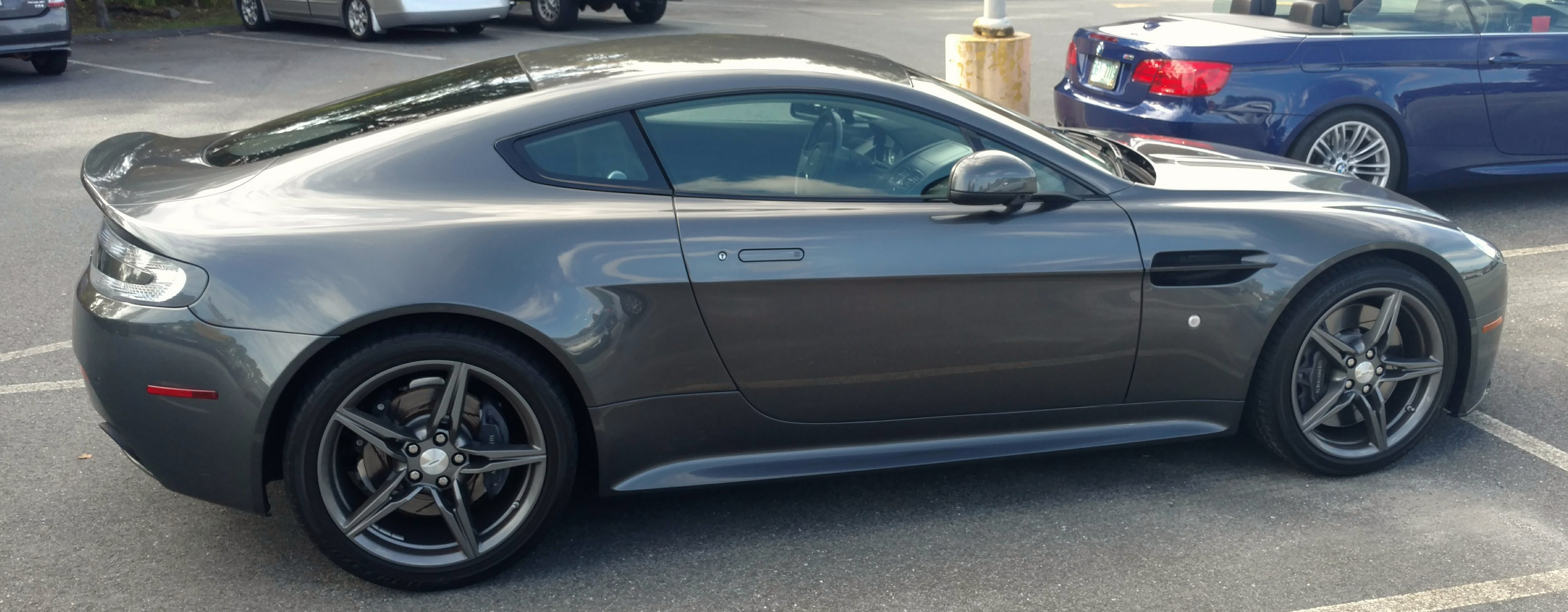
Aston Martin Vantage GTS Coupé (Side View)

Exclusive to the US market, the V8 Vantage GTS is the successor to the GT and S variants. This model is available with either a 6-speed manual or the Prodrive developed 7-speed Sportshift II transmission with paddle shift with the powertrain being identical to its predecessors. There are two trim levels, 'Sport' and 'Lux'. The former has carbon fibre accents with a black grille and headlight bezels alongside having a sportier suspension. The latter on the other hand, is largely just a standard configuration, but with the optional Bang & Olufsen sound system as standard. Both versions also received the then new AMi III infotainment and navigation system. The GTS was available as either a coupé or roadster with a total production run of 100 cars.

=== Vantage GT8 (2017) ===
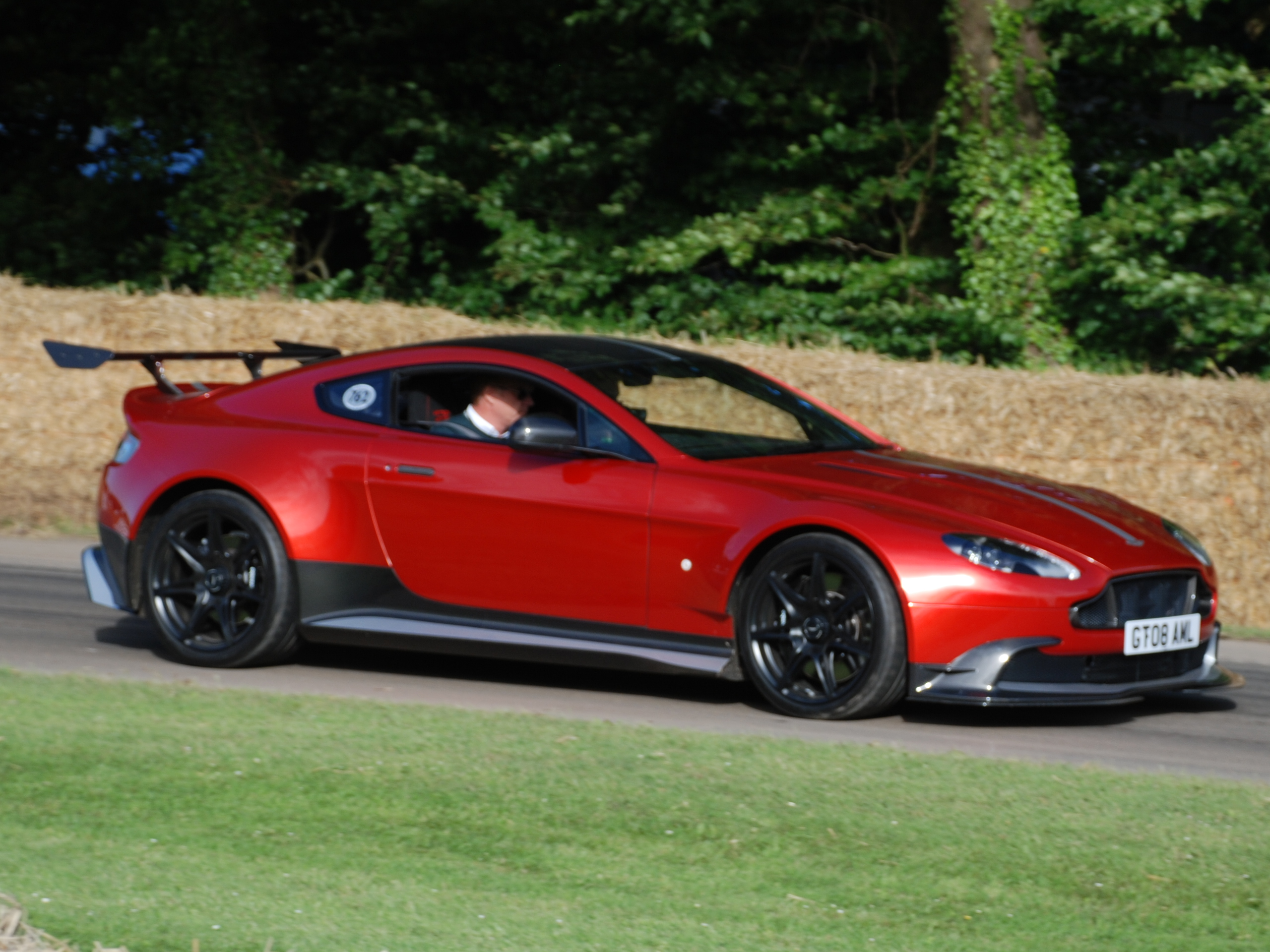
Aston Martin Vantage GT8

In 2017, Aston Martin announced a limited, track-focused iteration of the V8 Vantage: the Vantage GT8. The company would only manufacture 150 cars, 50 more than the GT12. The GT8 features the same 4.7-litre V8 as found in the base Vantage but with power now increased to 440 bhp (328 kW; 446 PS), and has a top speed of 190 mph (306 km/h). The GT8 is available with either a 6-speed manual or a 7-speed Sportshift II automated manual transmission, and has a kerb weight of 1,510 kg (3,329 lb), a 100 kg (220 lb) reduction over the V8 Vantage S.

== V12 Vantage variants ==
=== V12 Vantage / V12 Vantage Roadster (2009–2012) ===
On 11 December 2007, as part of Aston Martin's opening of their own design studio, the company unveiled a concept car based on the V8 Vantage. The car, known as the V12 Vantage RS, featured the AM11 V12 engine from the DBS and produced 510 bhp (380 kW; 517 PS) and 570 N⋅m (420 lb⋅ft) of torque. The power along with the kerb weight of 1,680 kg (3,704 lb) allows the car to accelerate from 0 to 62 mph (100 km/h) in 4.2 seconds and achieve a top speed of 190 mph (306 km/h).

Other additions include a new rear diffuser, a retractable rear-wing which can be raised or lowered, and carbon-ceramic brakes. The boot-lid and vented bonnet are also made from carbon-fibre to help decrease the car's weight. In early 2008, Aston Martin's CEO confirmed production of the V12 Vantage RS for mid-2009.

Development prototypes of the V12 Vantage RS appeared in April 2008 before Aston Martin unveiled the production version, simply called the V12 Vantage, in 2009.

On the finale of the 13th series of Top Gear, presenter Jeremy Clarkson drove the car, opining, "It's wonderful, wonderful, wonderful".

In September 2009, the V12 Vantage was confirmed for the United States market and then-CEO Ulrich Bez personally confirmed that homologation in the United States was underway. This was in response to the decision of expanding the production run beyond 1,000 units.

On 24 August 2011, Aston Martin announced that they were developing a GT3 version of the V12 Vantage, to replace the Aston Martin DBRS9. The race car was expected to be delivered by early 2012.

In 2013, Aston Martin unveiled a convertible version called the V12 Vantage Roadster with a limited production of 101 units. It has a larger rearspoiler and ventilation carbon openings in the bonnet. With a kerb weight of 1,760 kg (3,880 lb) the Roadster weighs 80 kg (176 lb) more due to chassis stiffening modifications, and because of the additional weight the Roadster accelerates from 0 to 62 mph (100 km/h) in 4.5 seconds, but retains the coupé's top speed of 190 mph (306 km/h).

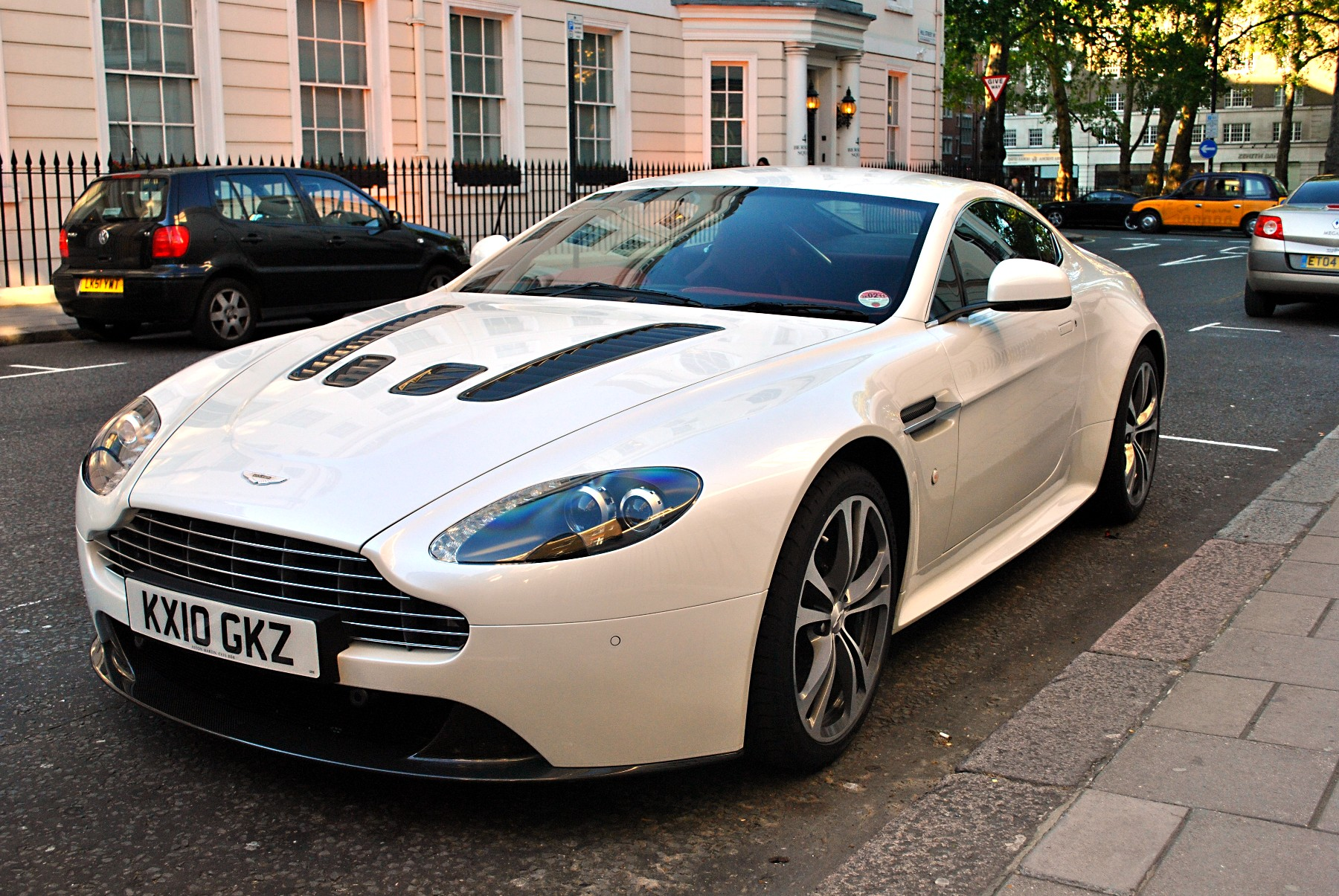
Aston Martin V12 Vantage

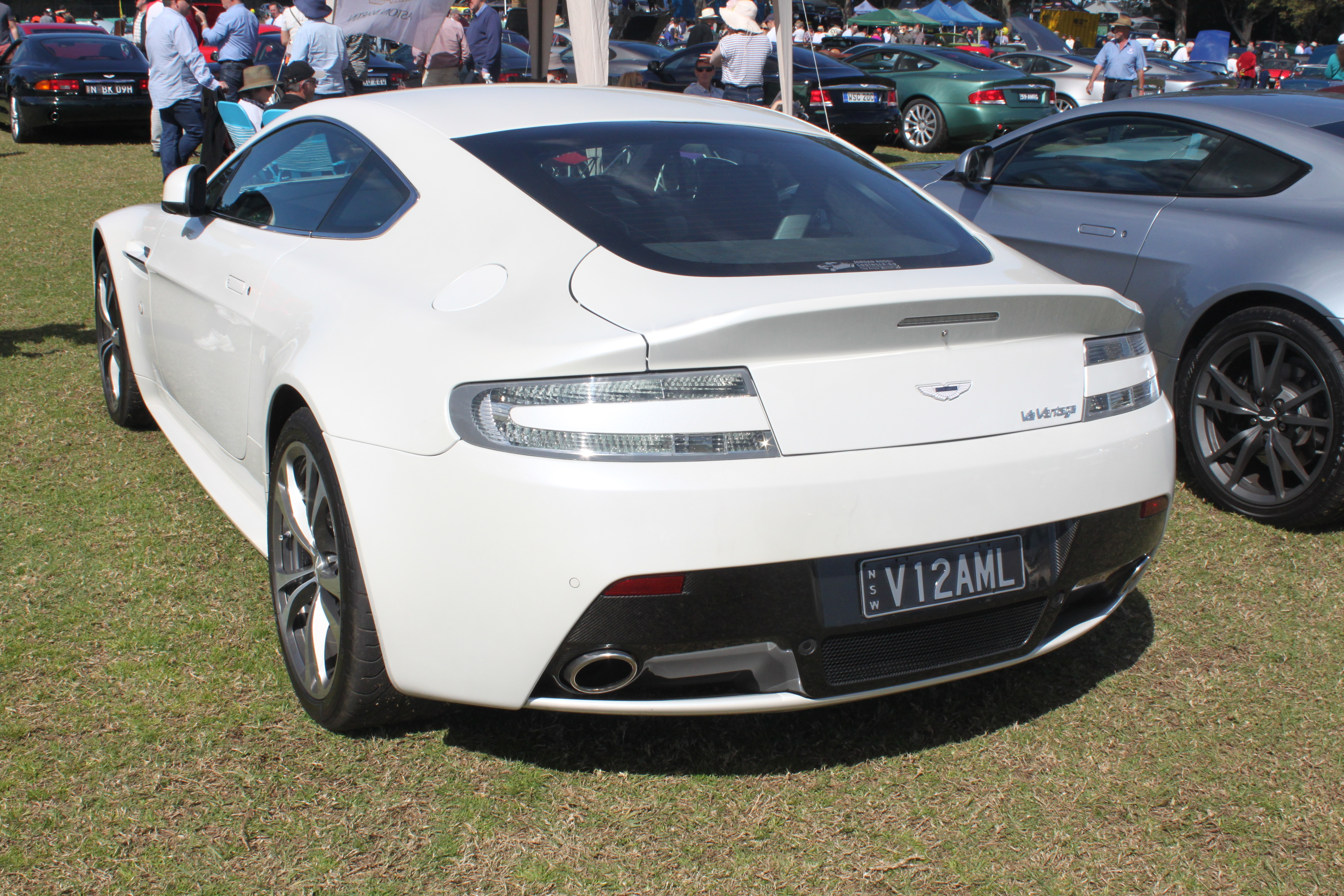
Aston Martin V12 Vantage (rear view)

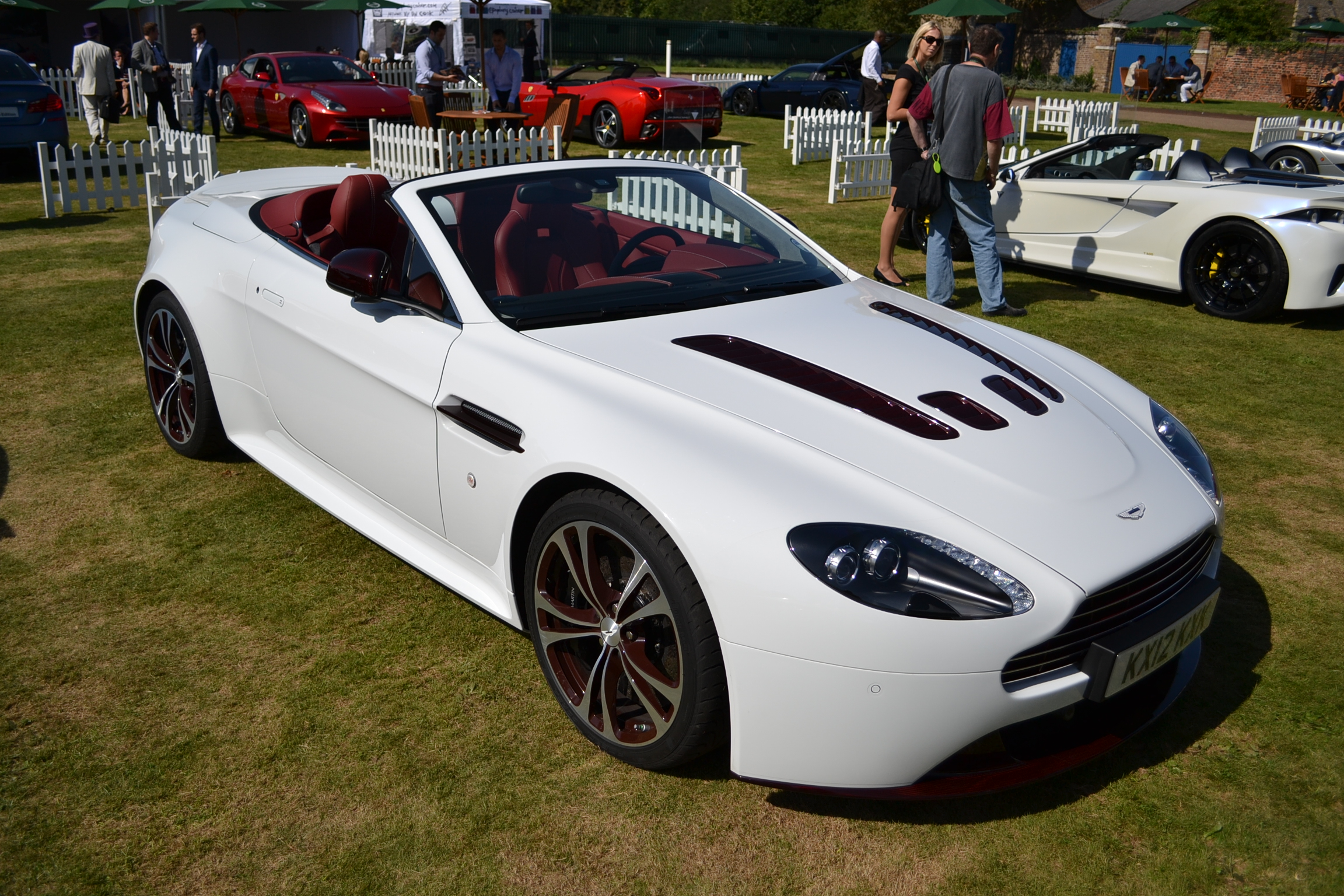
Aston Martin V12 Vantage Roadster

=== V12 Vantage S / V12 Vantage S Roadster (2013–2018) ===
On 28 May 2013, Aston Martin announced the V12 Vantage S – a sportier version of the V12 Vantage that preceded it.

The V12 Vantage S produces 565 bhp (421 kW; 573 PS) at 6,750 rpm and 620 N⋅m (457 lb⋅ft) at 5,750 rpm of torque from a revised 5,935 cc (5.9 L; 362.2 cu in) V12 engine called the AM28, which would be used as a base for future engines. The power is transferred to the rear wheels using a new 7-speed Sportshift III automated manual transmission, which weighs 25 kg (55 lb) less than the Sportshift II, with no option for a manual transmission. With a total kerb weight of 1,665 kg (3,671 lb), the V12 Vantage S is lighter than the standard V12 Vantage and features new three-stage adaptive damping for the suspension system, new carbon-ceramic brakes, and a unique track-mode for improved track performance for the drivers who want to take their car to the track. The V12 Vantage S is claimed to be able to accelerate from 0 to 62 mph (100 km/h) in 3.9 seconds and reach a top speed of 205 mph (330 km/h), making it the fastest production Aston Martin at the time alongside the One-77.

The exhaust on the V12 Vantage S was developed from the company's own One-77. Styling and aerodynamic changes include a carbon fibre front grille, black roof and rear grille, lightweight forged alloy wheels, and new finishes on the interior seats, doors and controls.

Aston Martin also launched a convertible version in 2014 called the V12 Vantage S Roadster. With a kerb weight of 1,745 kg (3,847 lb) the Roadster is 80 kg (176 lb) heavier than the coupé. Due to the added weight the Roadster accelerates from 0 to 62 mph (100 km/h) in 4.1 seconds before reaching a top speed of 201 mph (323 km/h).

In April 2016, the V12 Vantage S was announced to be produced with a 7-speed dog-leg manual transmission, unusual for its day and age. The shift pattern was engraved on the door sill. It was available with either the coupé or roadster bodywork. 351 were built in total, of which 260 were coupés and 91 roadsters; 100 were produced for the United States.

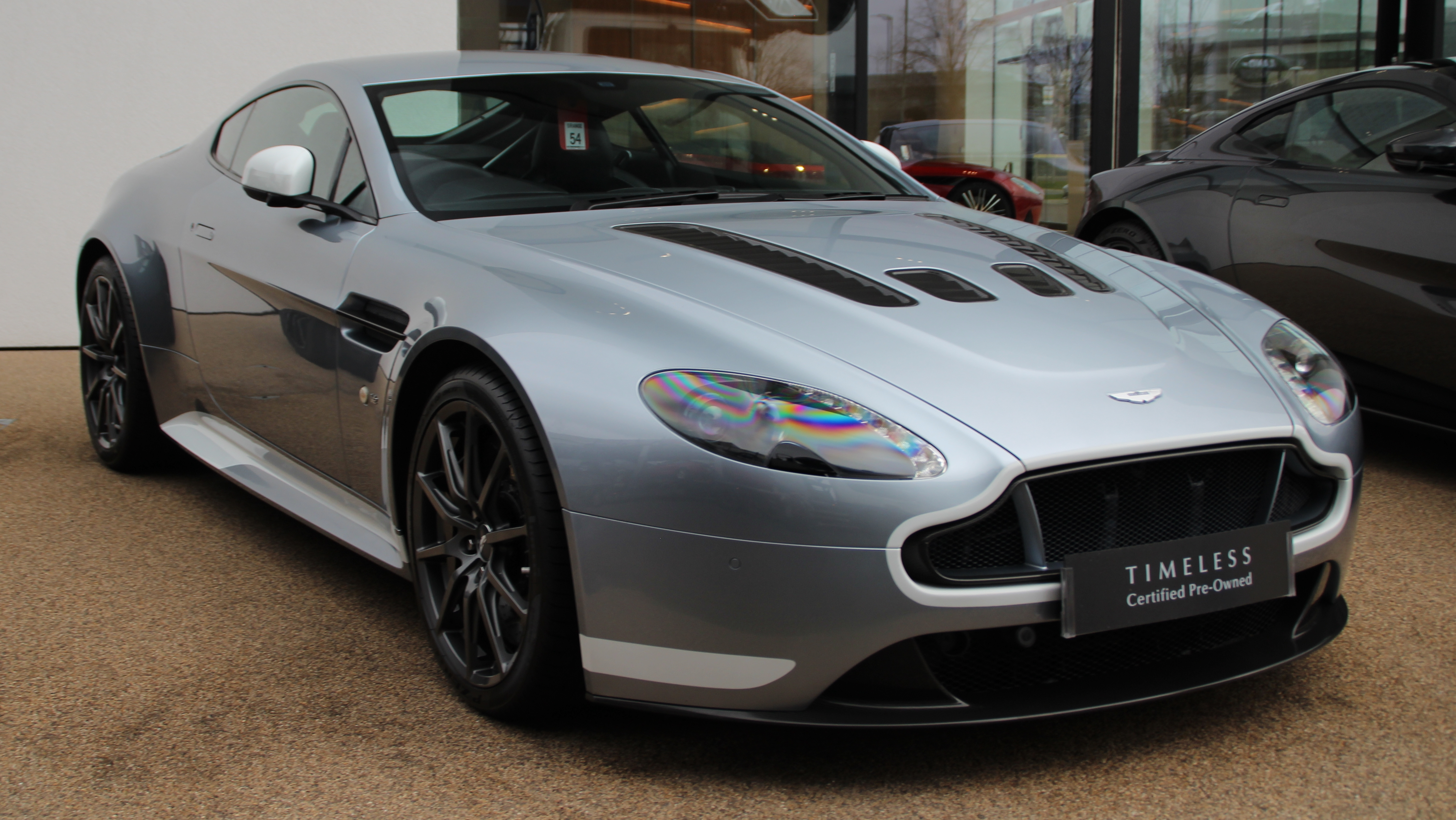
Aston Martin V12 Vantage S with AML graphics pack

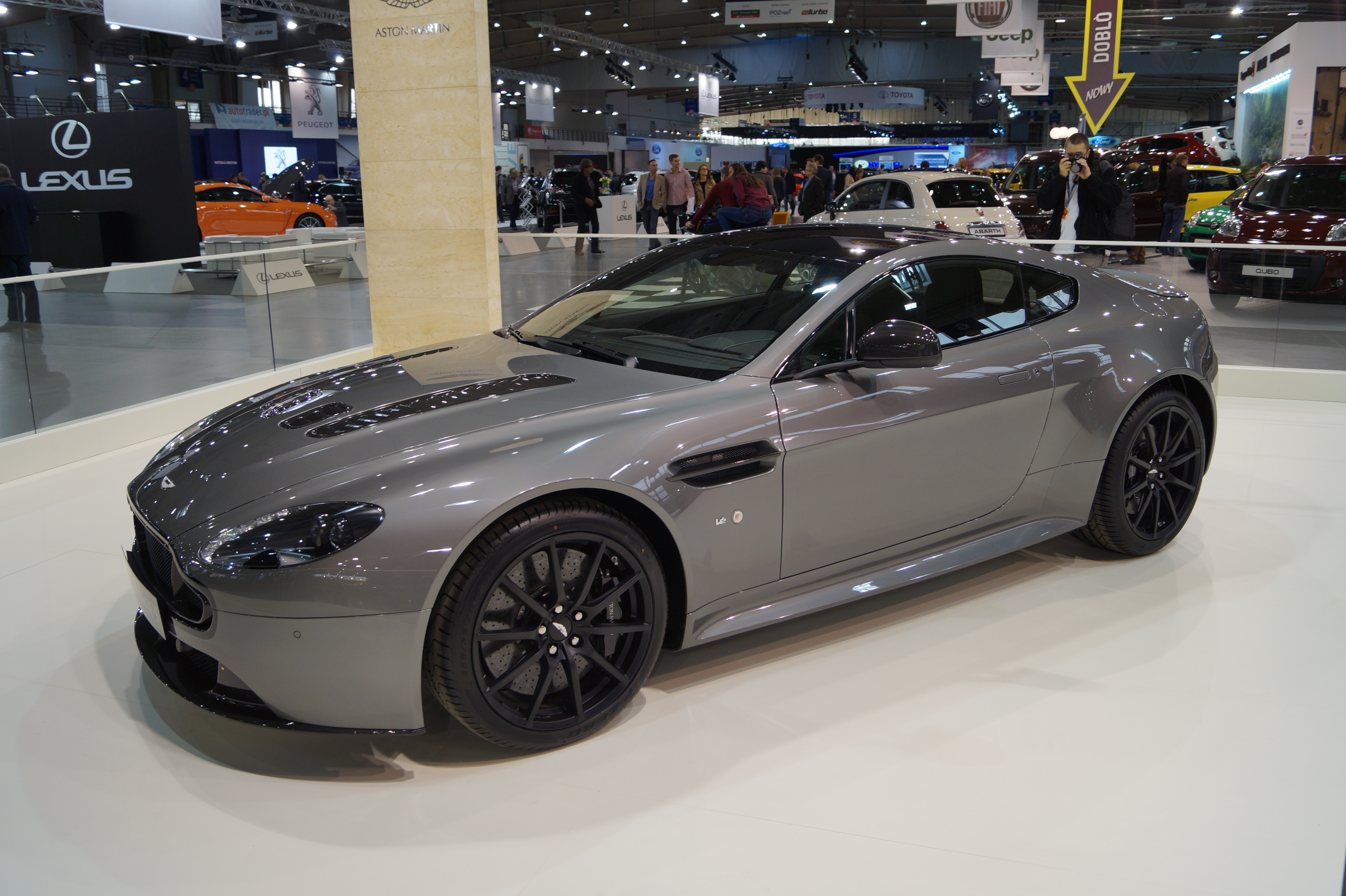
Aston Martin V12 Vantage S at Motor Show Poznań 2015

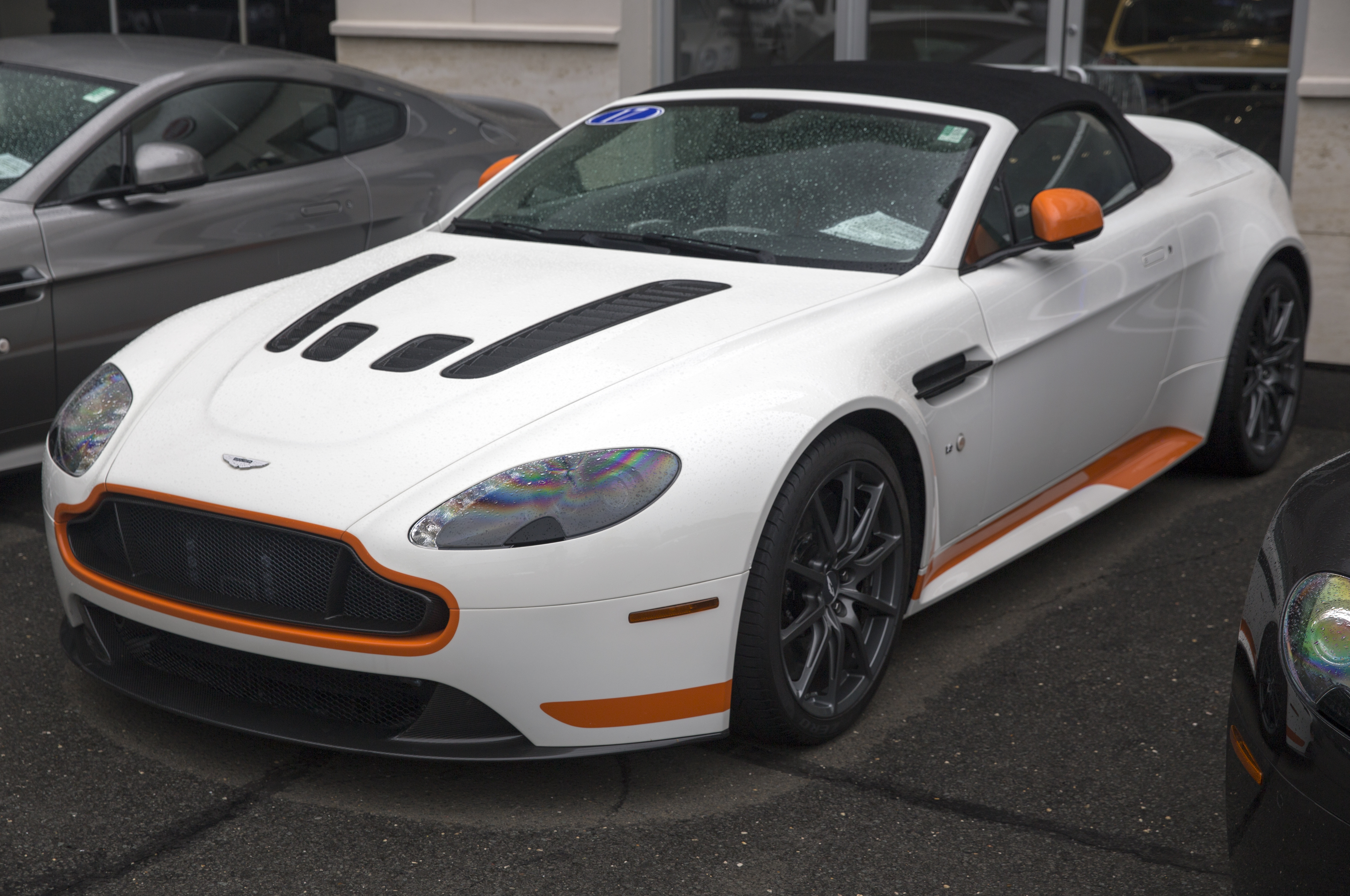
Aston Martin V12 Vantage S Roadster

=== V12 Zagato (2011) ===
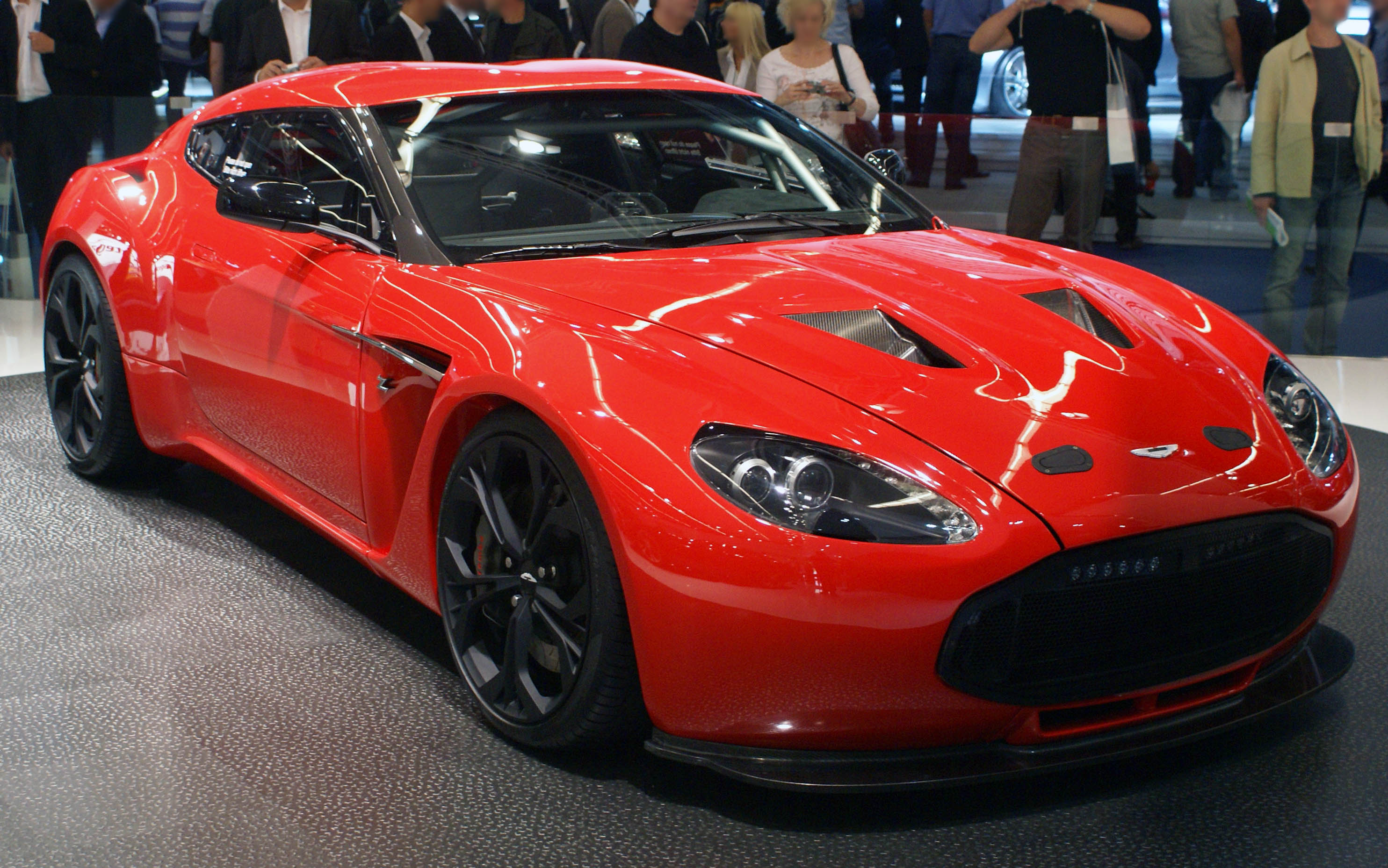
Aston Martin V12 Zagato

At the 2011 Concorso d'Eleganza Villa d'Este a racing concept by Zagato based on the V12 Vantage premiered celebrating the 50th anniversary of the DB4 GT Zagato. It was awarded the competition's "Design Award for Concept Cars and Prototypes" which was also awarded to the One-77 two years ago. The car then was brought to Nürburgring where it had its racing debut during the 53rd ADAC ACAS H&R-Cup VLN race on 28 May and competed in the 2011 24 Hours of Nürburgring driven amongst others by CEO Dr. Ulrich Bez.

Powered by the same AM11 V12 engine with 510 bhp (380 kW; 517 PS) and 570 N⋅m (420 lb⋅ft) of torque found in the DBS and V12 Vantage, the concept features a new handcrafted aluminium body with a front similar to that of the Vantage and a heavily modified middle, roof and rear section uniting design language used by both companies. Other features include an endurance racing fuel tank carrying up to 120 litres of fuel. Though being a racing concept Aston Martin produced a limited number of street legal examples as well.

=== Vantage GT12 (2015) ===
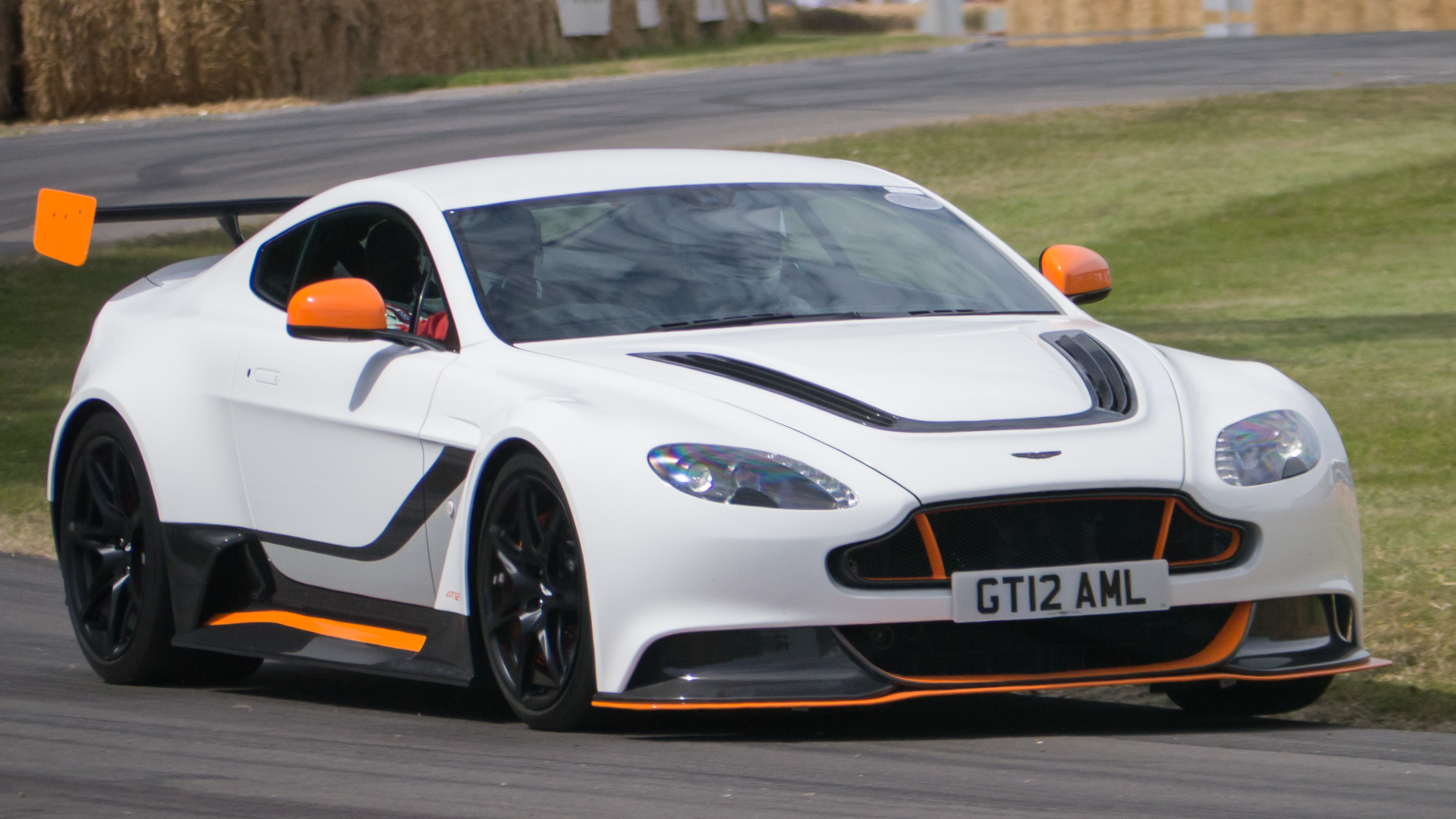
Aston Martin Vantage GT12

Aston Martin confirmed the production of the Aston Martin Vantage GT3 special edition unveiled at the 2015 Geneva Motor Show. The company would only manufacture 100 cars of the GT3 special edition. After a complaint from Porsche over the use of the "GT3" moniker, the car was renamed the Vantage GT12. The Vantage GT12 features a new iteration of the 5.9-litre AM28 V12 that produces 592 bhp (441 kW; 600 PS) and 625 N⋅m (461 lb⋅ft) of torque. It has a kerb weight of 1,565 kg (3,450 lb), and can accelerate from 0 to 60 mph (97 km/h) in 3.5 seconds.

=== Vantage GT12 Roadster (2016) ===
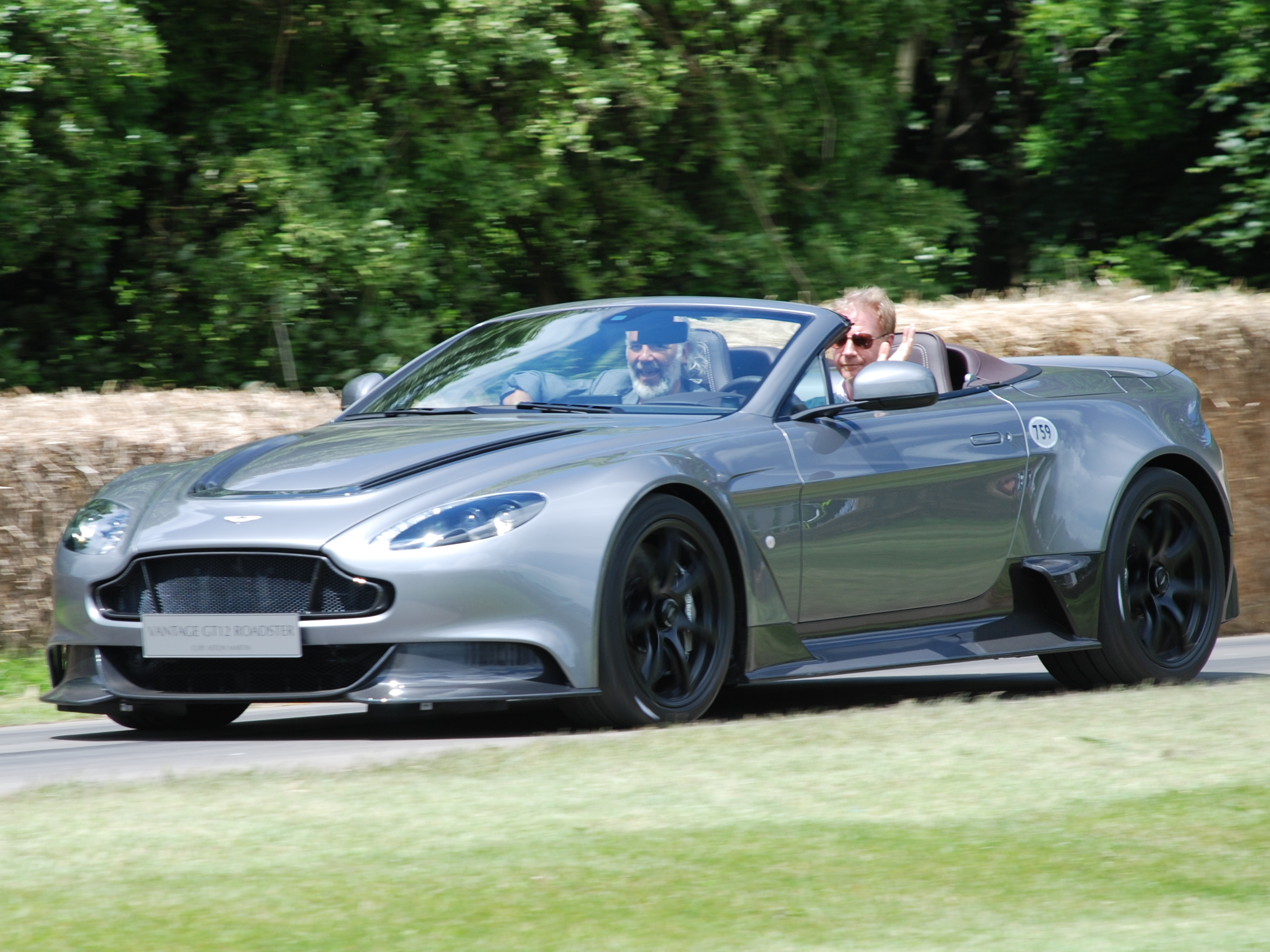
Aston Martin Vantage GT12 Roadster

The Aston Martin Vantage GT12 Roadster is a one-off project created by Aston Martin's Q division on a special customer request. The Vantage GT12 Roadster was officially revealed at the 2016 Goodwood Festival of Speed. It is mechanically similar to the Vantage GT12 and features a full carbon-fibre body. The roadster was completed in a period of nine months and features the coupé's front splitter, bonnet, front spoiler, and rear diffuser. The 7-speed Sportshift III automated manual transmission is also retained from the coupé but with a lower final drive ratio, reducing the top speed to 180 mph (290 km/h). The carbon-ceramic brakes, ABS and traction control found in the GT12 coupé have been reconfigured for the roadster. The GT12 Roadster weighs 100 kg (220 lb) less than the V12 Vantage S Roadster.

=== Vantage AMR / Vantage AMR Roadster (2017) ===
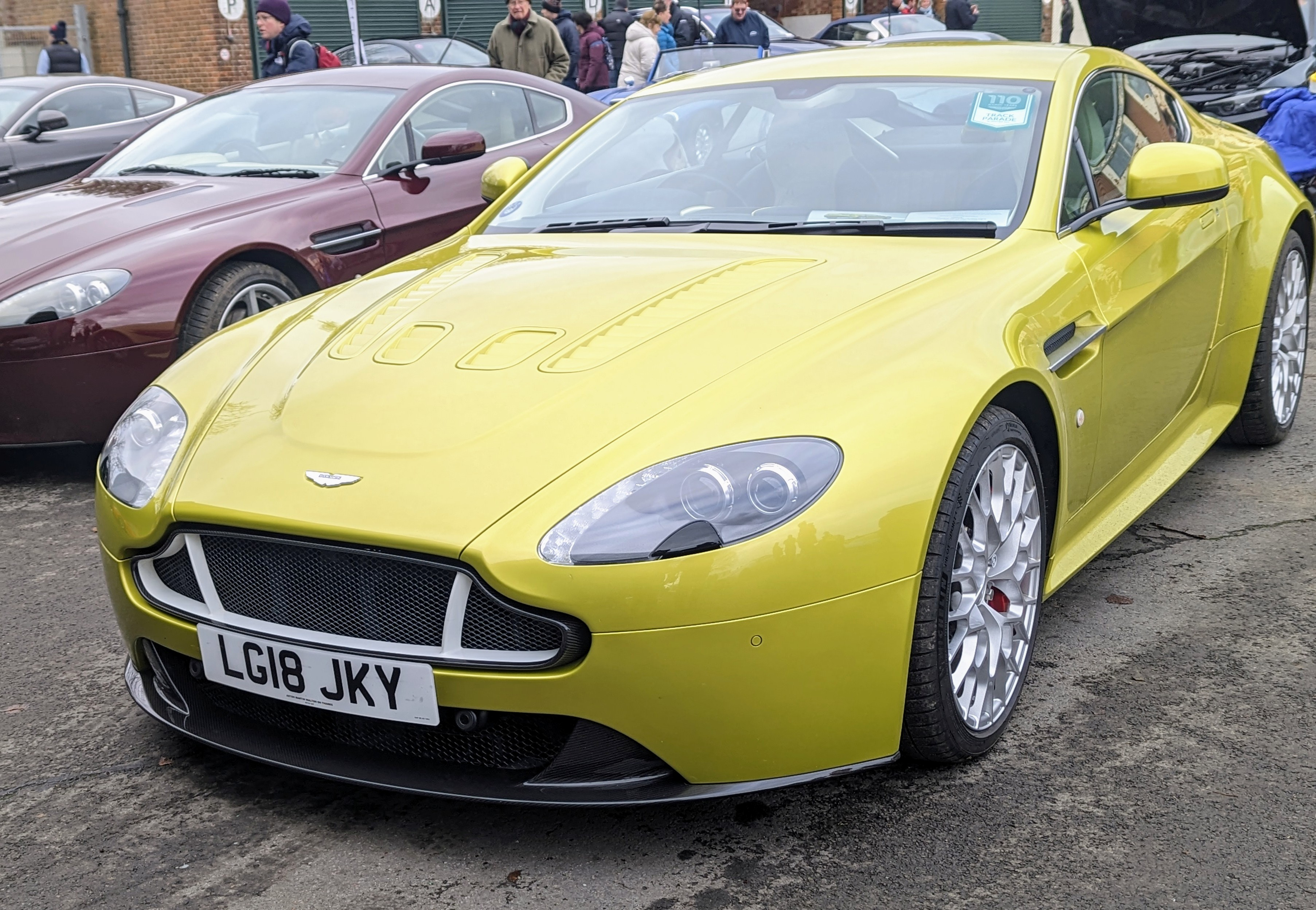
Aston Martin Vantage AMR (V12)

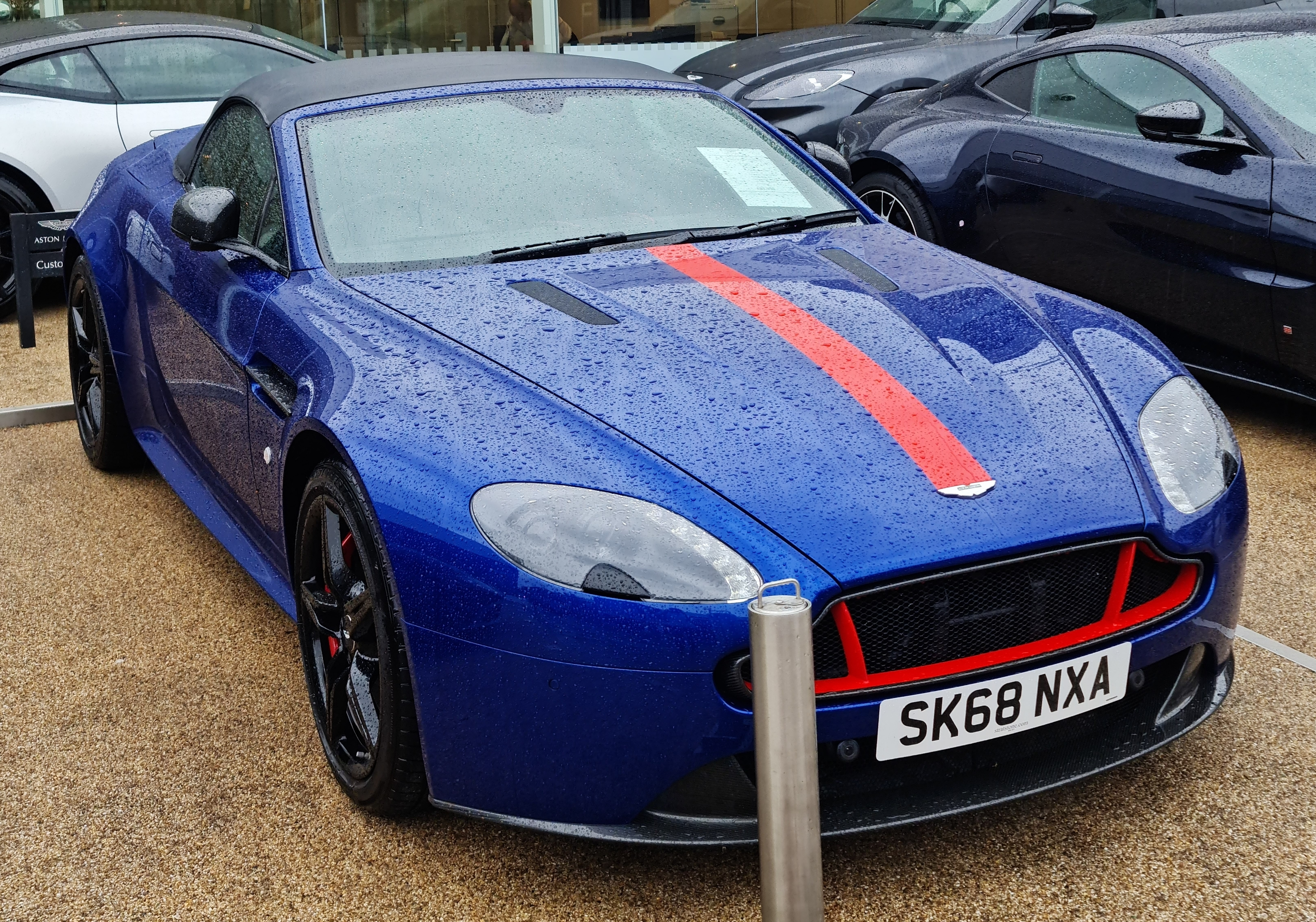
Aston Martin Vantage AMR Roadster (V8)

In 2017, Aston Martin launched the AMR editions of its V12 and V8 Vantage. Production is limited to 300 cars split between 200 V8 vehicles and 100 V12. The 4.7-litre V8 AMR produces the same 430 bhp as the regular V8 Vantage S. It was available as either a coupé, or a roadster.

=== Vantage AMR Pro (2017) ===
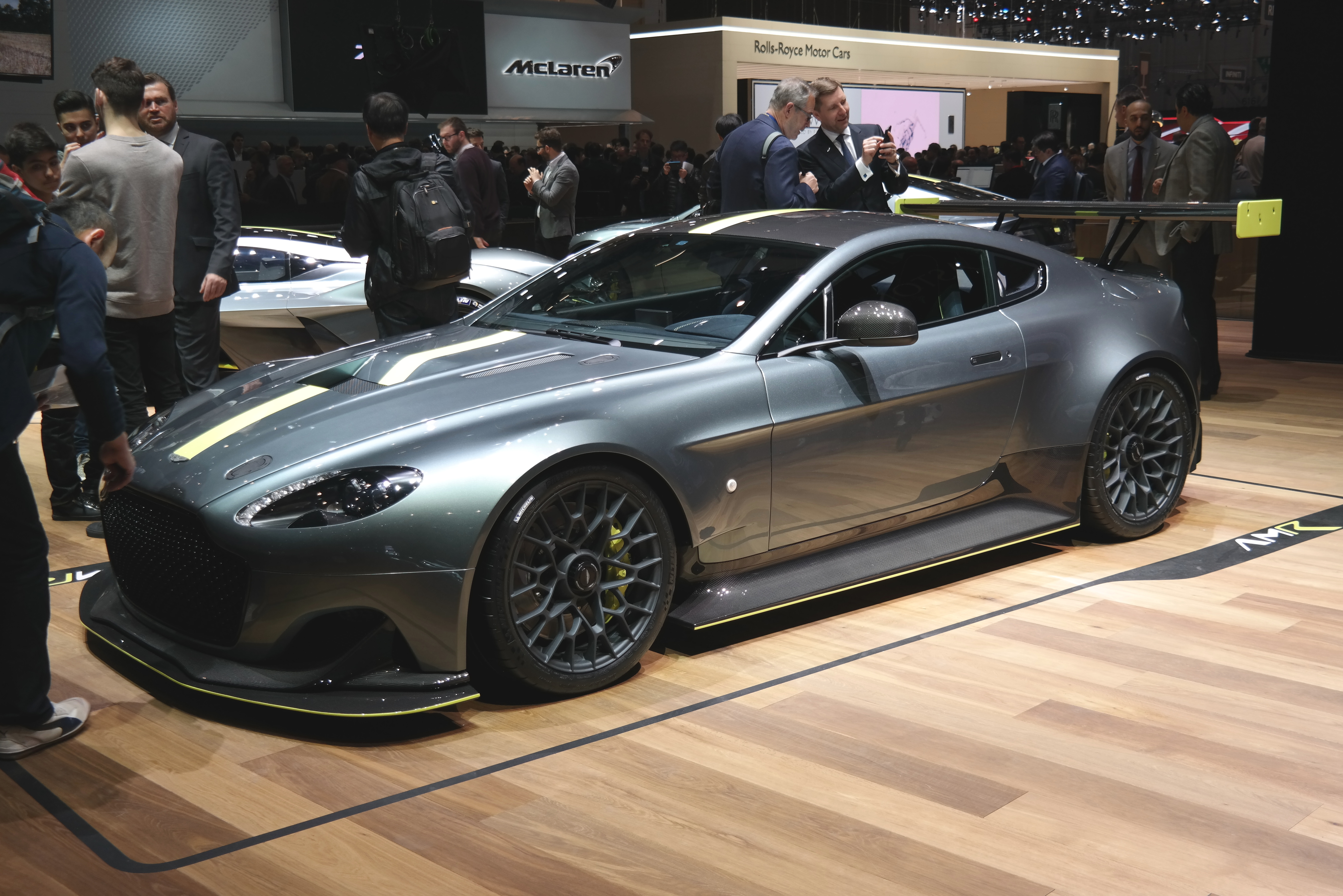
Aston Martin Vantage AMR Pro

At the 2017 Geneva Motor Show, Aston Martin revealed the AMR Pro model as a new addition to the ever-expanding Vantage line. The AMR Pro is designed to be a "civilian" accessible race car and to slot under the Vulcan track car. The AMR Pro features many design traits from both the Vantage GT3 and GTE race cars, including a massive rear wing, larger front splitter, and exposed carbon fibre. It also features unique styling touches like a black mesh grille and unique black wheels. The AMR Pro uses a variant of the GT4 race car's V8 racing engine which produces 509 bhp (380 kW; 516 PS) and 415 lb⋅ft (563 N⋅m) of torque. The Vantage AMR Pro has a kerb weight of 1,465 kg (3,230 lb). A total of seven were built.

=== Vantage V600 / Vantage V600 Roadster (2018) ===
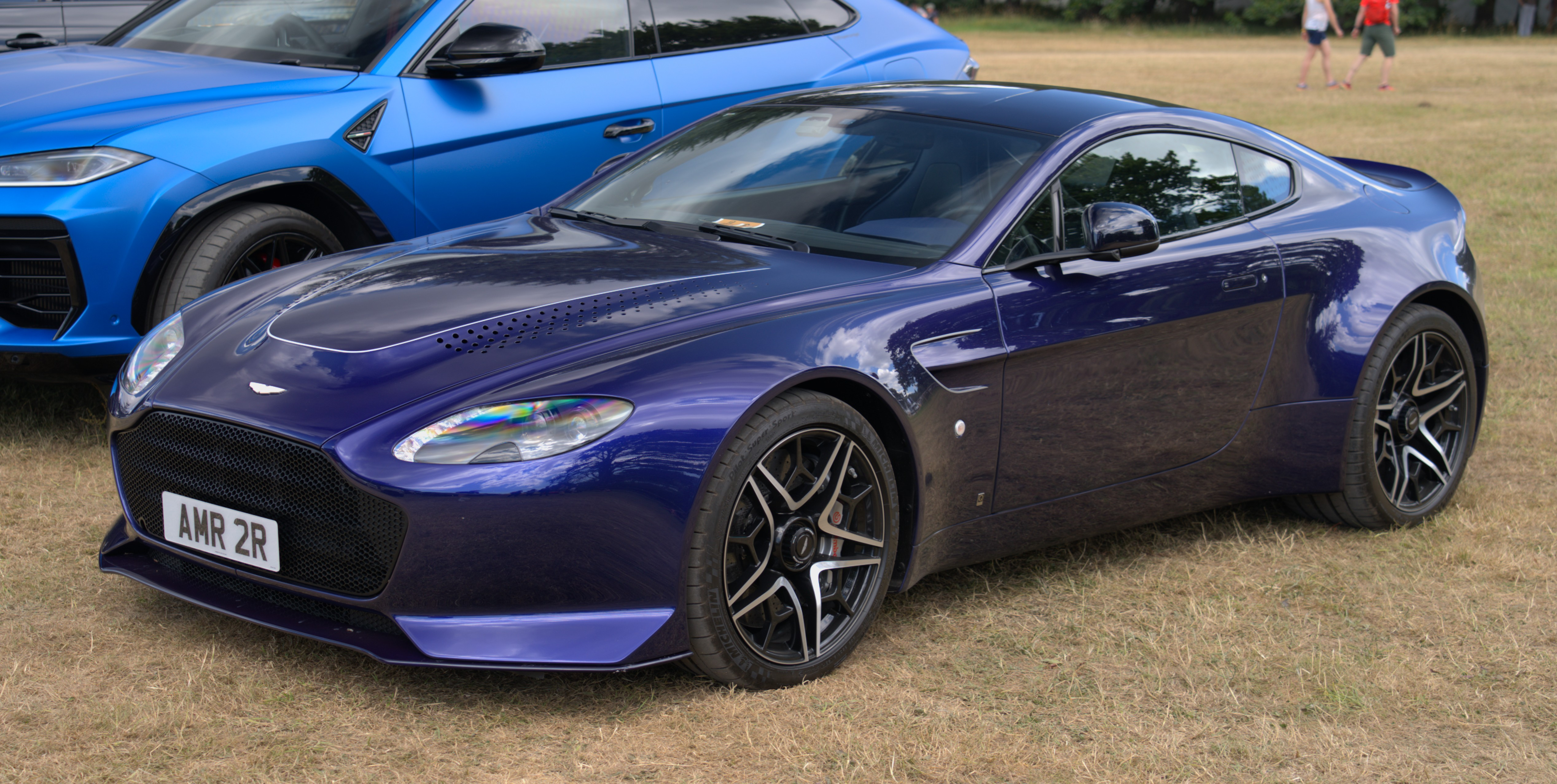
Aston Martin Vantage V600 Coupe

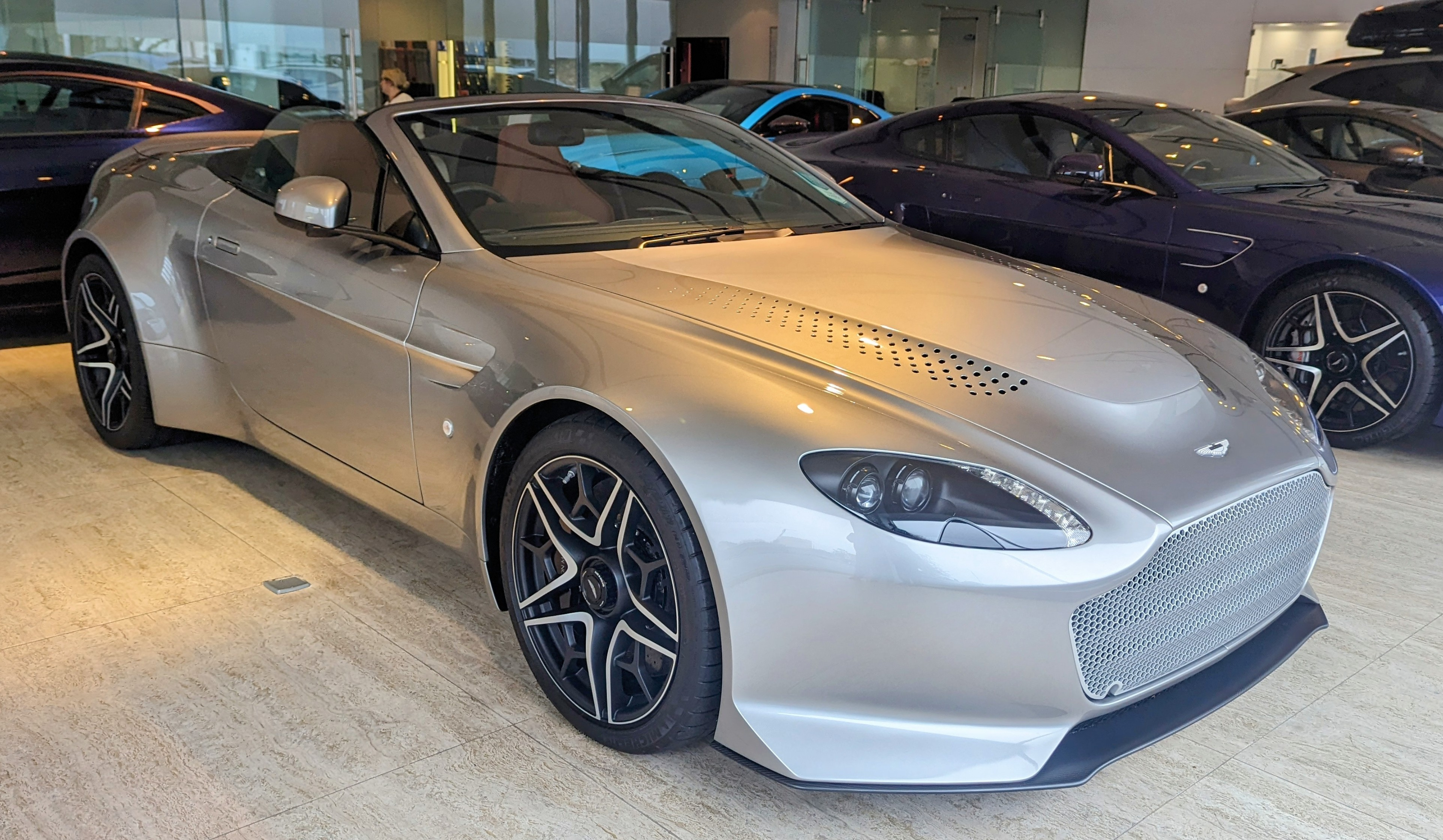
Aston Martin Vantage V600 Roadster

The Vantage V600 is the last production variant of the V12 Vantage built as a tribute to the Virage-based Vantage V600. The car is the result of a special customer request of a bespoke and more powerful V12 Vantage. The customer ordering the car has agreed-upon limited production of the car and 14 units were built, seven in each body style. The car features many unique bits that set it apart from the outgoing V12 Vantage. The Vantage V600 uses the AM28 V12 engine found in the Vantage GT12, which has a power output of 592 bhp (441 kW; 600 PS) and 625 N⋅m (461 lb⋅ft) of torque. The engine is coupled to a 7-speed manual transmission exclusive to this variant. Deliveries of the Vantage V600 began in late 2018.

== Motorsport ==
=== N24 ===
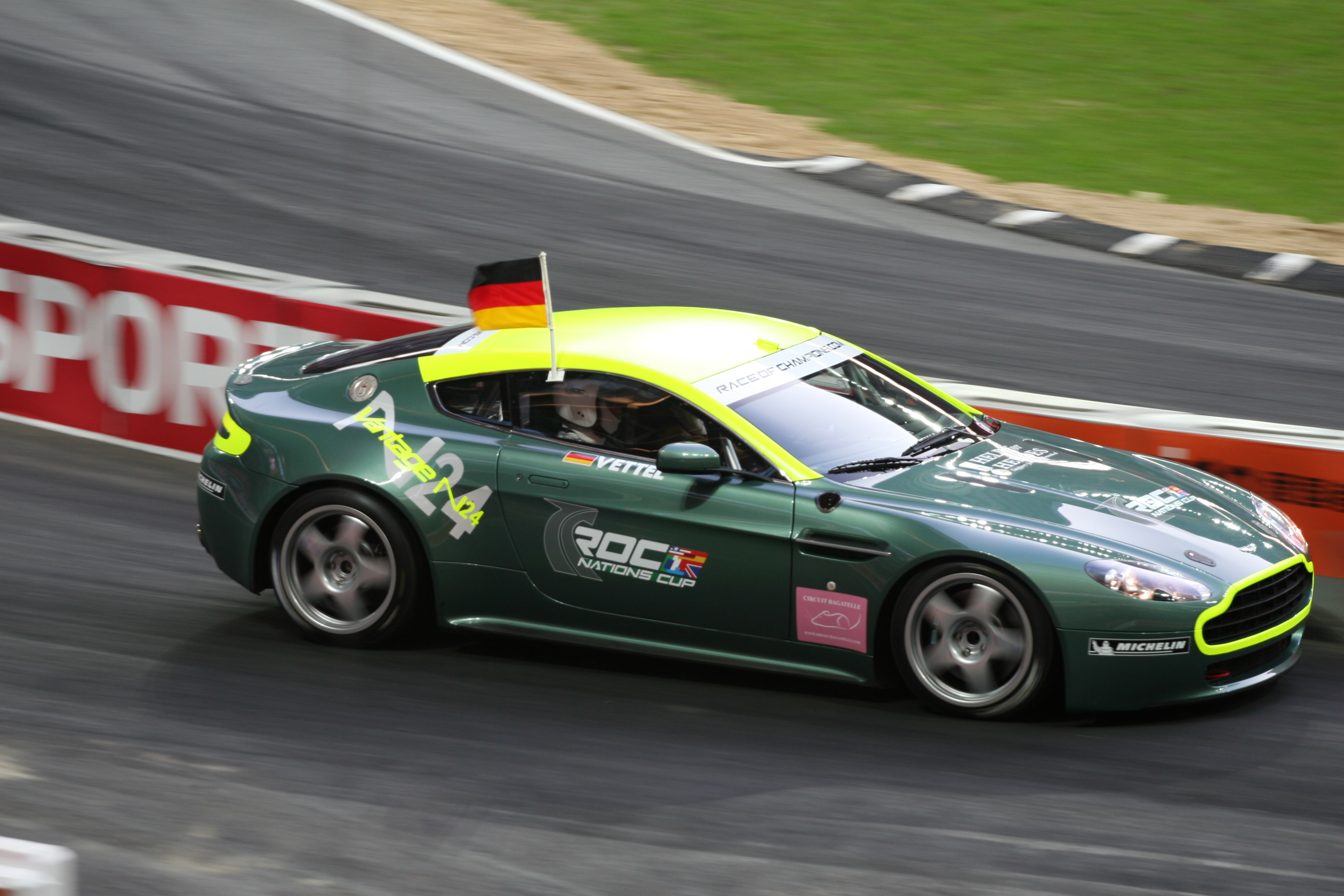
Aston Martin V8 Vantage N24 driven by Sebastian Vettel at the 2007 Race of Champions event

During the 2006 British Motor Show in London, Aston Martin Racing revealed a near-stock version of the V8 Vantage that would compete in the Nürburgring 24 Hours endurance race. The car, now known as the V8 Vantage N24, was driven by Aston Martin CEO Dr. Ulrich Bez, development engineer Chris Porrit, development driver Wolfgang Schuhbauer and German journalist Horst Graf von Saurma-Jeltsch in the 24‑hour race. The car finished 4th in class and 24th overall, before being driven home on public roads after the race. While essentially much like the existing coupé, the N24 had a front splitter and extended door sills for aerodynamic efficiency, a full roll cage, a racing fuel tank, and other modifications necessary to make the car race-worthy. Other modifications include the removal of most of the interior, including all seats, replaced by a lone Recaro drivers' seat.

Later in 2006, Aston Martin confirmed that they would offer the V8 Vantage N24 to customers as a track car similar to a Porsche 911 GT3 Cup. The N24 specification complies with FIA GT4 European Cup, German VLN series, Grand-Am Cup, and various other national series' requirements.

The V8 Vantage N24 was featured in the BBC television series Top Gear, selected by James May in the presenters' quest to find the best driving road in Europe. Based on a grand tourer—less seat padding, air conditioning, suspension travel, and other comforts—the N24 was mocked by co-hosts Richard Hammond and Jeremy Clarkson as an ill-considered choice.

Additional honours have included a first and second the 2007 European GT4 race at Silverstone, the first 3 places in their class at the 2008 Nurburgring 24 hours race (18th out of 220 cars entered overall), and strong showings in Bahrain, VLN racing, and other tracks and events throughout the world. The N24 was also the basis of a one-make pan-Asia series called Aston Martin Asia Cup. Competitors ran in identically-prepared N24s at various Asian circuits.

=== Rally GT ===
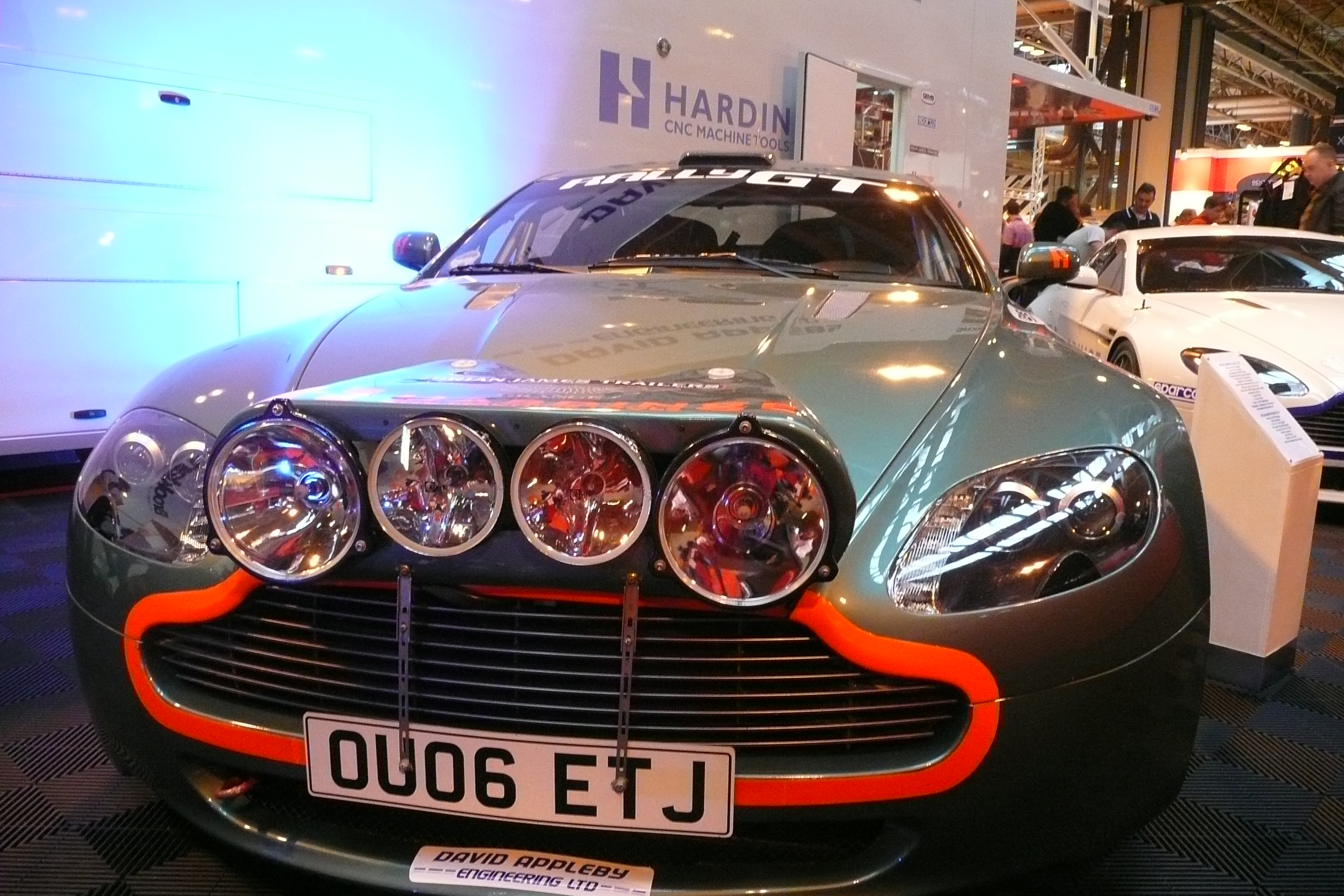
Vantage Rally GT at Autosport International in 2010

Developed alongside the N24, the V8 Vantage Rally GT undergoes similar modifications by Prodrive for use in rallying. The unique modifications include a slight increase in engine power, Eibach sport shocks, and an optional close-ratio gearbox. The Rally GTs were used by the Race of Champions as part of their line-up of cars in 2006.

=== GT2 ===
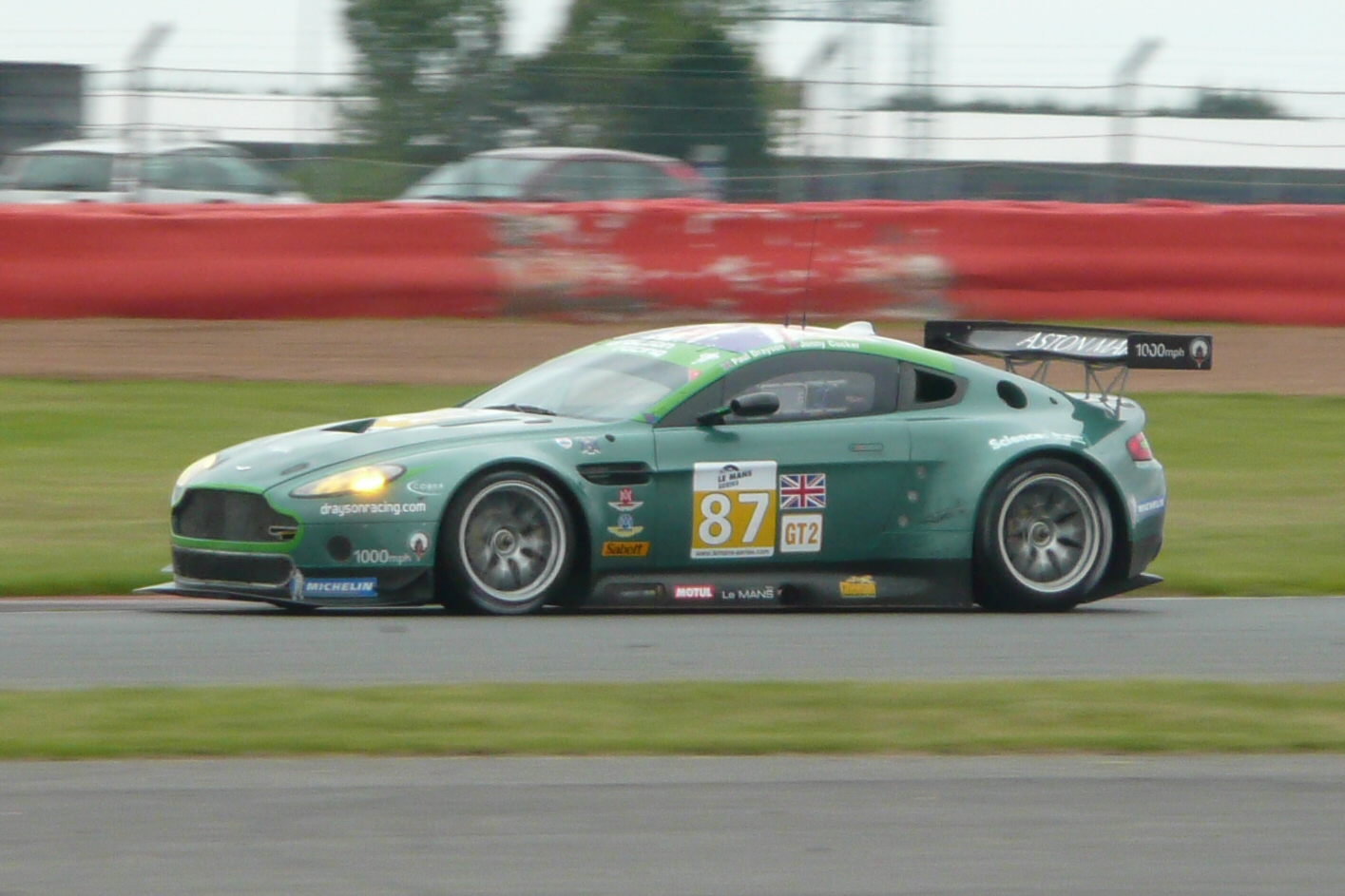
Drayson Racing's Aston Martin Vantage GT2 racing in the Le Mans Series at Silverstone Circuit in 2009

Debuting in 2008, the V8 Vantage GT2 is the most powerful racing variant of the V8 Vantage family. Designed to meet FIA and ACO GT2 class regulations, the Vantage GT2 would become a customer car for use in the FIA GT Championship, American Le Mans Series, Le Mans Series, and 24 Hours of Le Mans. The V8 Vantage GT2 has been tuned to be capable of running E85 ethanol or normal racing fuel, dependent on the racing series. Aston Martin V8 Vantage GT2 saw its racing debut at the 2008 Grand Prix of Long Beach, driven by Paul Drayson, a former Minister of State in the United Kingdom, and Jonny Cocker, 2004 British GT Champion.

James Watt Automotive ran the V8 Vantage GT2 in the Le Mans Series 2008, although the car failed to make the start of its debut race due to mechanical problems.

The V8 Vantage GT2 was used by A Speed Team in the 2010 Super GT season.

JMW Motorsport ran a V8 Vantage GT2 in the Le Mans Series 2010.

Following the poor performance of the Aston Martin AMR-One prototype, Aston Martin Racing decided to switch to running the Vantage as a factory effort in 2012. The car was slightly upgraded and was called the Vantage GTE, which has improved bodywork and engine performance over the older GT2 model. One car was entered into the FIA World Endurance Championship, and a second car appeared at the 24 Hours of Le Mans.

=== GT3 ===
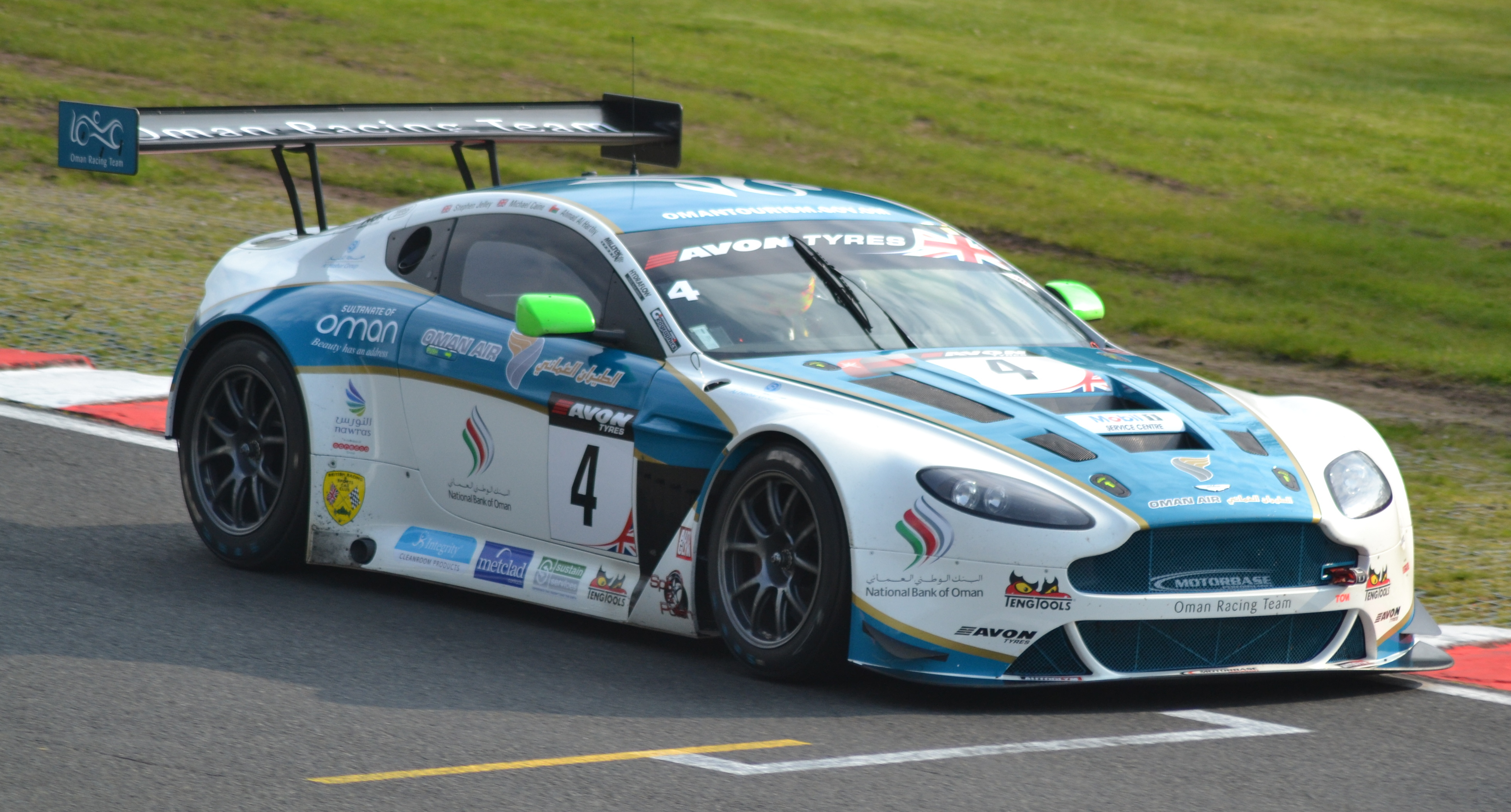
Oman Racing Team's Aston Martin V12 Vantage GT3 racing in the 2014 British GT Championship at Oulton Park.

In 2011, Aston Martin unveiled the V12 Vantage GT3 as a replacement for the DBRS9 in the Group GT3 class segment. The V12 Vantage GT3 has a power output of 625 bhp (466 kW; 634 PS) and 746 N⋅m (550 lb⋅ft) of torque from the AM11 engine, with a kerb weight of 1,250 kg (2,756 lb). It raced successfully in domestic and international series for seven years until its last major event in February 2019 at that year's 2019 Bathurst 12 Hour, where it led until the final minutes against newer machinery, finishing in 2nd. The V12 Vantage GT3 was succeeded by the next-generation Vantage in 2019 with the Vantage AMR GT3. It is so far the last GT3 race car to utilize a V12 engine.

=== GT4 ===
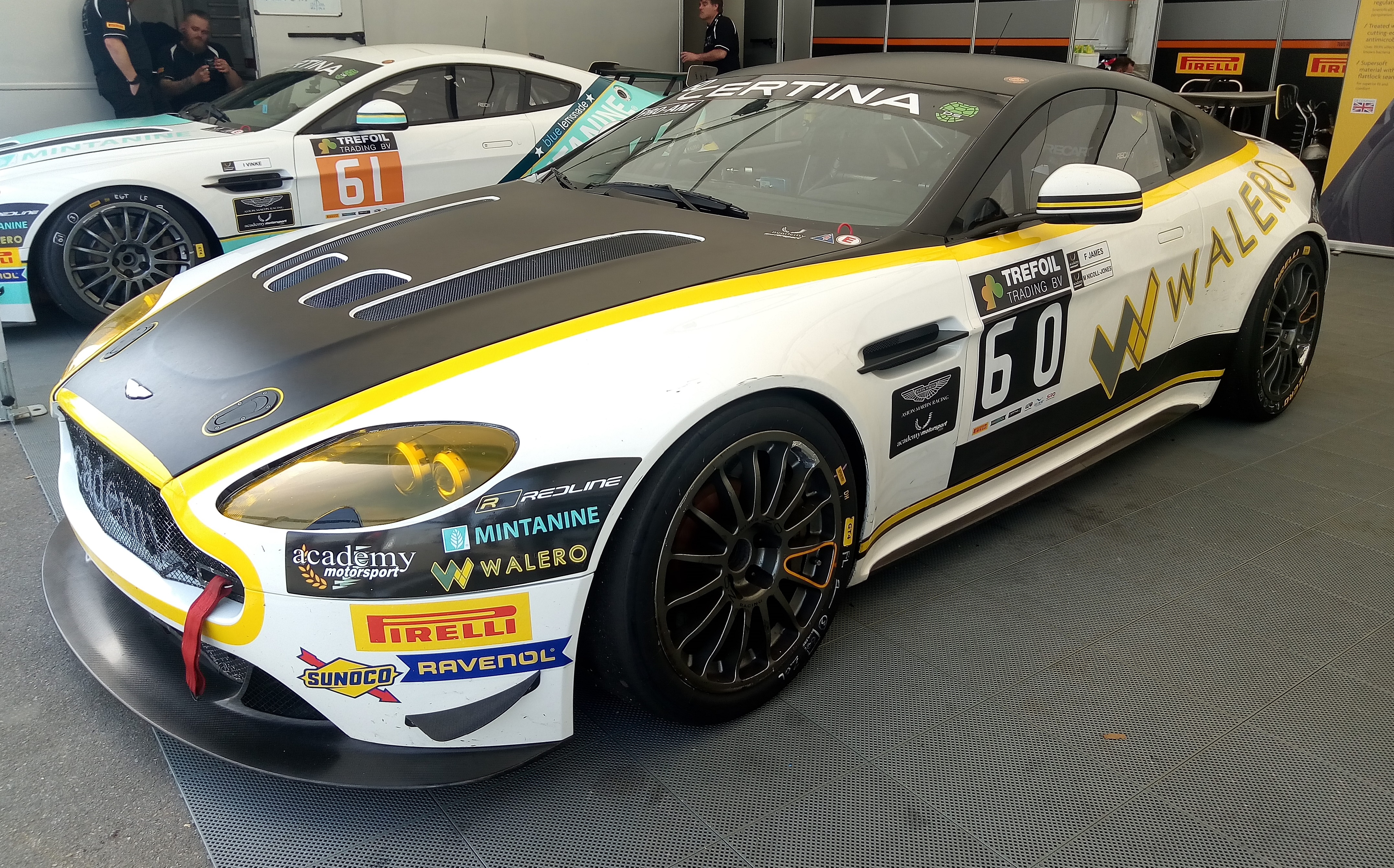
Aston Martin V8 Vantage GT4

In late 2008, Aston Martin debuted an updated version of the N24, known as the V8 Vantage GT4. Its primary alteration is the introduction of the new 4.7-litre V8 engine that also debuted in the production V8 Vantage. This replaces the 4.3-litre V8 previously used in the V8 Vantage N24. The suspension and brakes have also been updated along with a new front splitter, wheels and a fixed rear wing.

=== Grand Am ===
For the 2012 Continental Tire Sports Car Challenge season, Multimatic Motorsports entered two Vantages in the series, using the 4.7-litre V8 engine. Upon debut at Daytona International Speedway, they finished sixteenth.
