= Aston Martin Vanquish (2012) =

British grand touring car

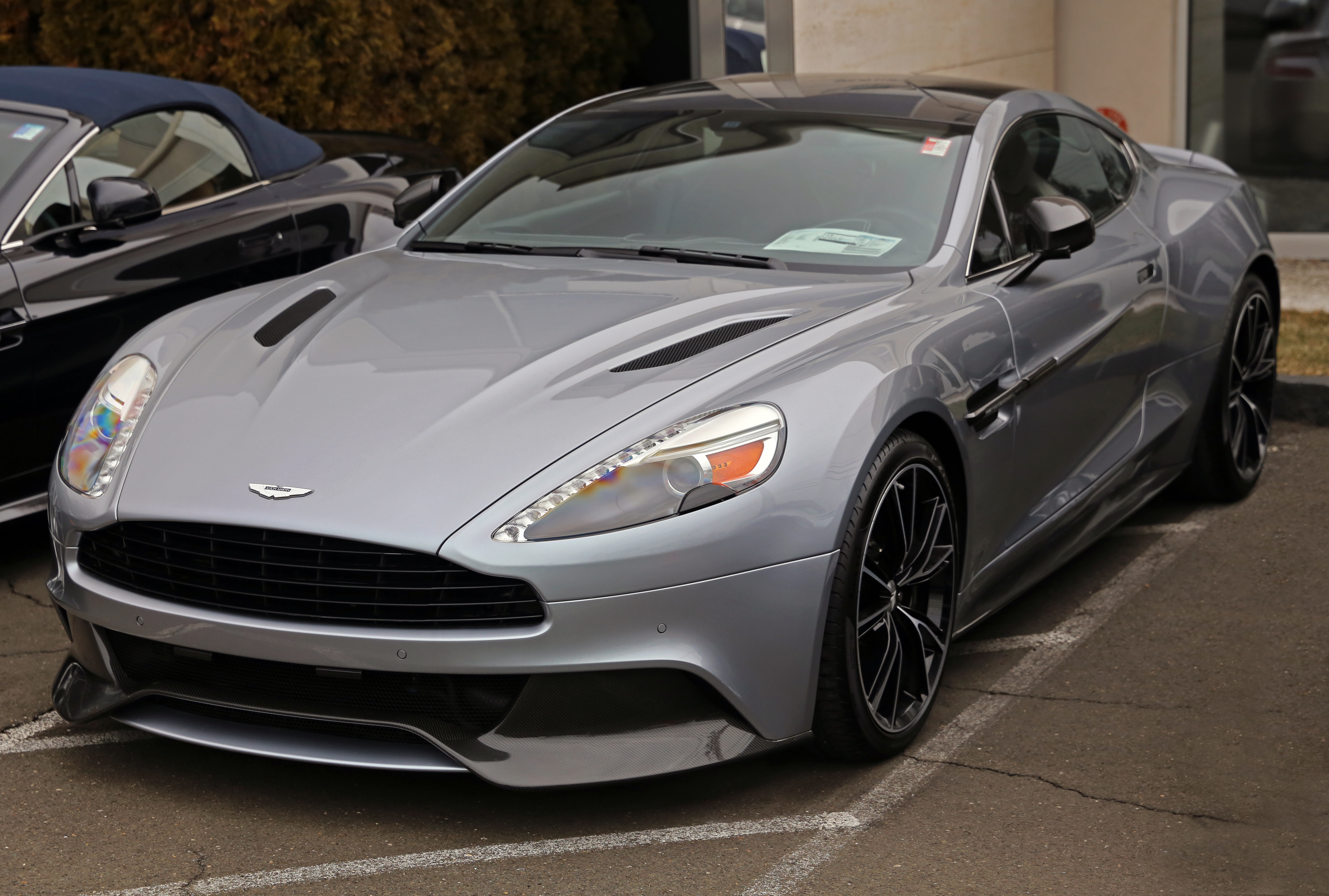

Overview
- Manufacturer: Aston Martin Lagonda Limited
- Model code: AM310
- Production: 2012–2018
- Assembly: United Kingdom: Gaydon, Warwickshire
- Designer: Marek Reichman

Body and chassis
- Class: Grand tourer
- Body style: 2-door coupé; 2-door convertible
- Platform: Aston Martin VH
- Related: Aston Martin DB9; Aston Martin Rapide

Powertrain
- Engine: 5.9 L Aston Martin V12
- Transmission: 6-speed ZF 6HP 26 (Touchtronic II) automatic (2012–2014); 8-speed ZF 8HP70 (Touchtronic III) automatic (2014–2018)

Dimensions
- Wheelbase: 2,740 mm (107.9 in)
- Length: 4,720 mm (185.8 in)
- Width: 1,905 mm (75.0 in)
- Height: 1,280 mm (50.4 in)
- Kerb weight: 3,850 lb (1,746 kg)

Chronology
- Predecessor: Aston Martin DBS
- Successor: Aston Martin DBS Superleggera

British carmaker Aston Martin manufactured and marketed the second generation of its Vanquish between 2012 and 2018. A grand touring car, it succeeded the DBS, resurrected the name of the 2001–2007 model, and was available as both a coupe and a convertible, the latter known as the Volante. It would later itself be succeeded by the DBS Superleggera.

Designed by Marek Reichman, the Vanquish was preceded by a concept car called the Project AM310 that Aston Martin presented at the 2012 Concorso d'Eleganza Villa d'Este in Lombardy, Italy. The production version was presented at a sneak preview at the Goodwood Festival of Speed and to a group of guests at the London Film Museum in July; and during the Monterey Car Week in August. The Vanquish is based on the DB9's architecture, namely the vertical/horizontal platform. Extensively incorporating aluminium in its construction, the Vanquish was assembled in Gaydon, Warwickshire, England.

Aston Martin presented the Vanquish Volante at the 2013 Pebble Beach Concours d'Elegance, with deliveries starting in late 2013. In 2014, the company made minor modifications to the Vanquish's engine performance. A more significantly modified version, called the Vanquish S, was launched in 2016; its Volante version was released the following year. The Vanquish S introduced such updates as increased horsepower and torque, and a new body kit. Aston Martin produced the Vanquish Zagato—a special edition—in various body styles, including a coupe, convertible, shooting brake, and a roadster, the latter dubbed the Speedster.

== History ==
Aston Martin presented the DB9, initially designed by Ian Callum and completed by Henrik Fisker, at the Frankfurt Motor Show in 2003. The DB9 was the first car to employ Aston Martin's "vertical/horizontal" (VH) platform and the first production model built at Aston Martin's factory in Gaydon, Warwickshire, England. At the 2005 Geneva International Motor Show, Aston Martin debuted the Vantage, a sports car designed by Callum and Fisker. Built on the VH platform, the Vantage was engineered to compete with the Porsche 911 and other premium sports cars. In 2007, Aston Martin began producing the DBS, which succeeded the V12 Vanquish.

At the May 2012 Concorso d'Eleganza Villa d'Este, Aston Martin presented a concept car called the Project AM310. In June 2012 the company announced that the production version of the car would be called the Vanquish, resurrecting the name of the 2001–2007 model and succeeding the DBS as the company's flagship car. The Vanquish was shown at several events in 2012: a sneak preview at the Goodwood Festival of Speed in July, a presentation to a group of guests at the London Film Museum in the same month, and an appearance at the Monterey Car Week in August. Official manufacture of the car began in the same year at Gaydon, where the Vanquish was produced until 2018, when it was succeeded by the DBS Superleggera, which also used a V12 engine.

== Design and technology ==
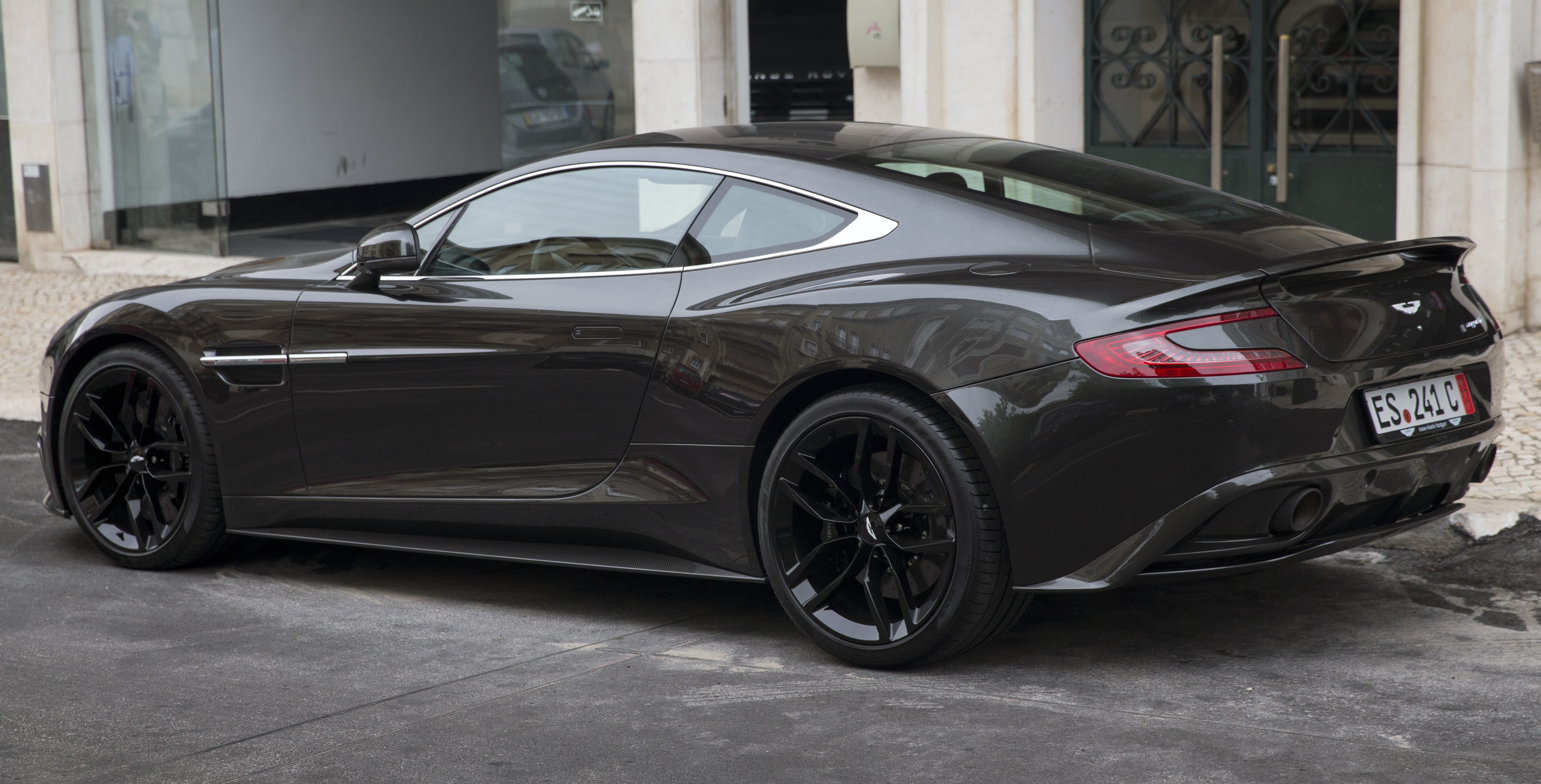
Rear view

The Vanquish, designed by Marek Reichman, is based upon Aston Martin's VH platform. The Vanquish's aluminium structure is thirty per cent stiffer and lighter than that of its predecessor, and its bodywork is made of carbon fibre. The car has 25 per cent more torsional rigidity than its predecessor due to the carbon fibre subframe and a large, extruded cross-member. The Vanquish features anti-roll bars and double wishbone suspension supported by coil springs. The aluminium structure of the Vanquish is mostly unchanged from the DBS, DB9 and Rapide, except for a redesigned front-end that is significantly lighter. This allows the engine to be mounted 0.7 inches (18 mm) lower than in the DBS.

The Vanquish has been described as both a sports car and a grand tourer. It is a two-door coupe available in both two- and four-seating configurations. The Vanquish has a front-mid mounted engine and a rear-wheel drive configuration. The braking system has ventilated carbon ceramic discs. The Vanquish has a three-stage adjustable adaptive damping system which allows the driver to choose between normal, sport, and track modes. The vehicle incorporates Pirelli P Zero tyres. The United States Environmental Protection Agency reported that the Vanquish has a fuel consumption rating of 15 miles per US gallon (16 L/100 km; 18 mpg_{‑imp}). According to The Sunday Times, the car has a CO_{2} emission rating of 298 grams per kilometre (16.9 oz/mi).

The Vanquish uses a 5.9-litre V12 engine that produces a power output of 421 kilowatts; 565 horsepower (573 PS) at 6,750 revolutions per minute (rpm) and a torque output of 620 newton-metres (457 lb⋅ft) at 5,500 rpm, sufficient to give the car a 0 to 100 km/h (62 mph) acceleration of 4.1 seconds and a top speed of 295 km/h (183 mph). The vehicle was initially available exclusively with a six-speed 'Touchtronic' automatic transmission manufactured by ZF Friedrichshafen. In 2014, Aston Martin introduced technical updates to the Vanquish model. The modifications included a new eight-speed automatic transmission, known as 'Touchtronic III', and an upgraded engine that produces 424 kilowatts; 568 horsepower (576 PS) and 630 newton-metres (465 lb⋅ft) of torque, sufficient to give the car a 0 to 100 km/h (62 mph) acceleration time of 3.6 seconds and a maximum speed of 323 km/h (201 mph).

The Vanquish's design incorporates a tilt-telescoping steering wheel, bi-xenon headlamps, LED tail-lights, leather and Alcantara, (Note: On the steering wheel and headliner) power front seats with memory, and cooling and heating systems. Its connectivity features include Bluetooth, satellite radio and compatibility with USB. Other standard features include a thirteen-speaker Bang & Olufsen sound system. The cargo space of the Vanquish—the cabin and boot—measures 368 litres (13.0 cu ft), which is more than 60 per cent larger than that of the DBS.

== Variants ==
=== Vanquish Volante ===
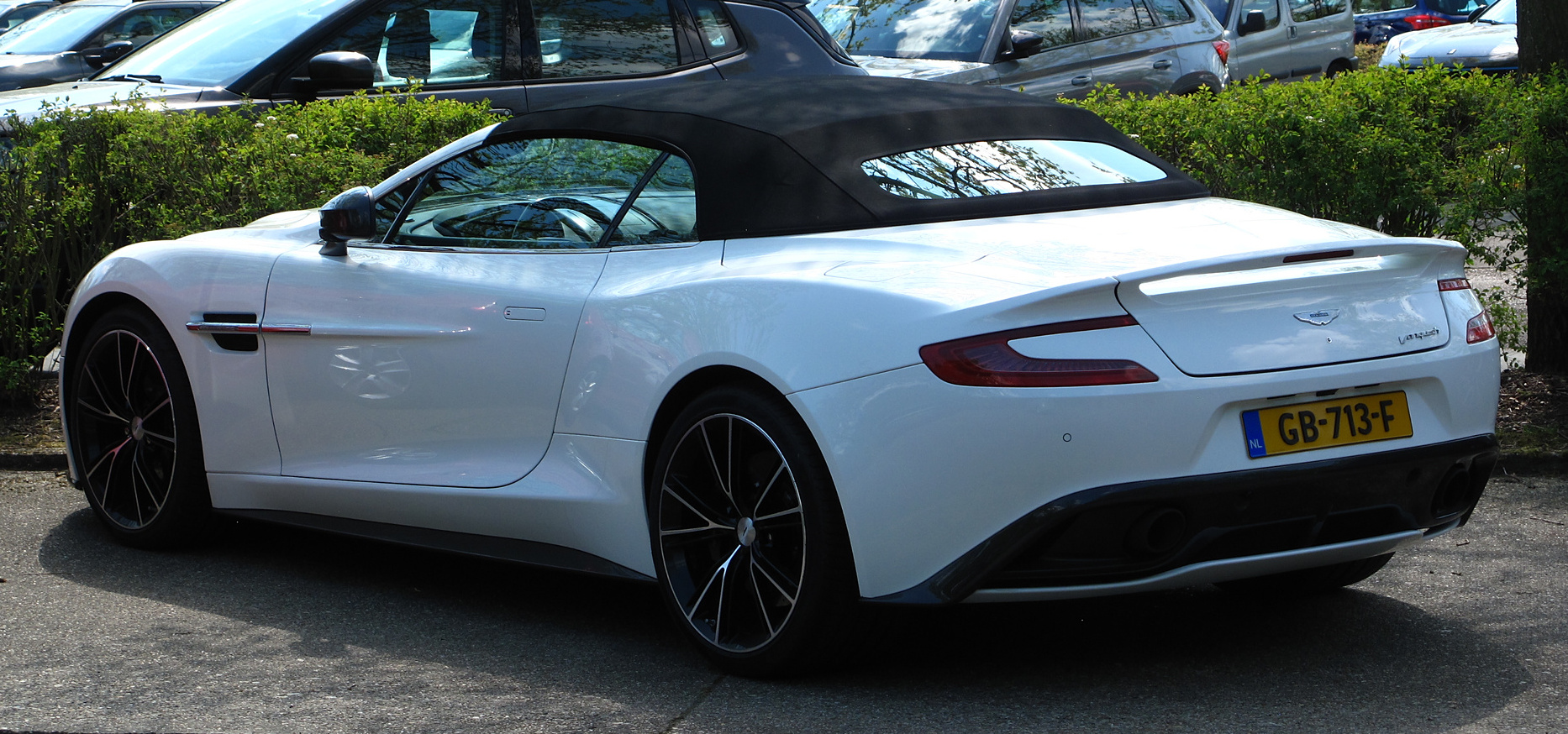
2014 Vanquish Volante

Aston Martin presented the Vanquish Volante—the convertible version of the Vanquish—at the 2013 edition of the Pebble Beach Concours d'Elegance, and it began deliveries in late 2013. It exclusively has four seats. Its maximum speed remains unchanged, but its 0 to 100 km/h (62 mph) acceleration decreased to 4.2 seconds. Weighing 1,844 kilograms (4,065 lb), the Vanquish Volante is 105 kilograms (231 lb) heavier than the coupe and 34 kilograms (75 lb) heavier than the DBS Volante. The suspension system was adjusted to accommodate the added weight. The convertible top of the Volante, which is made of triple-layer fabric, can open in fourteen seconds. The car has a boot space capacity of 279 litres (9.9 cu ft). As with the coupe, its standard three-stage adaptive damping system offers normal, sport, and track modes, which also adjust the electronic stability control and throttle response.

=== Vanquish S ===
Aston Martin introduced the Vanquish S, an updated version of the Vanquish, at the Los Angeles Auto Show in November 2016. Its power output was increased to 444 kilowatts; 595 horsepower (603 PS) whilst its torque output remained at 630 newton-metres (465 lb⋅ft). Aston Martin improved the response time of the transmission. The Vanquish S can accelerate from 0 to 100 km/h (62 mph) in 3.5 seconds and the top speed remains unchanged at 323 km/h (201 mph). The Vanquish S also features a new body kit composed of exposed carbon fibre, diamond-turned alloy wheels and carbon bonnet louvres. The seats can be upholstered in Bridge of Weir Caithness leather. Andy Palmer, the chief executive officer of Aston Martin, stated that the Vanquish S "[took] things a step further, confidently asserting itself within the Aston Martin range and distinguishing itself from the new DB11".

=== Vanquish Zagato ===
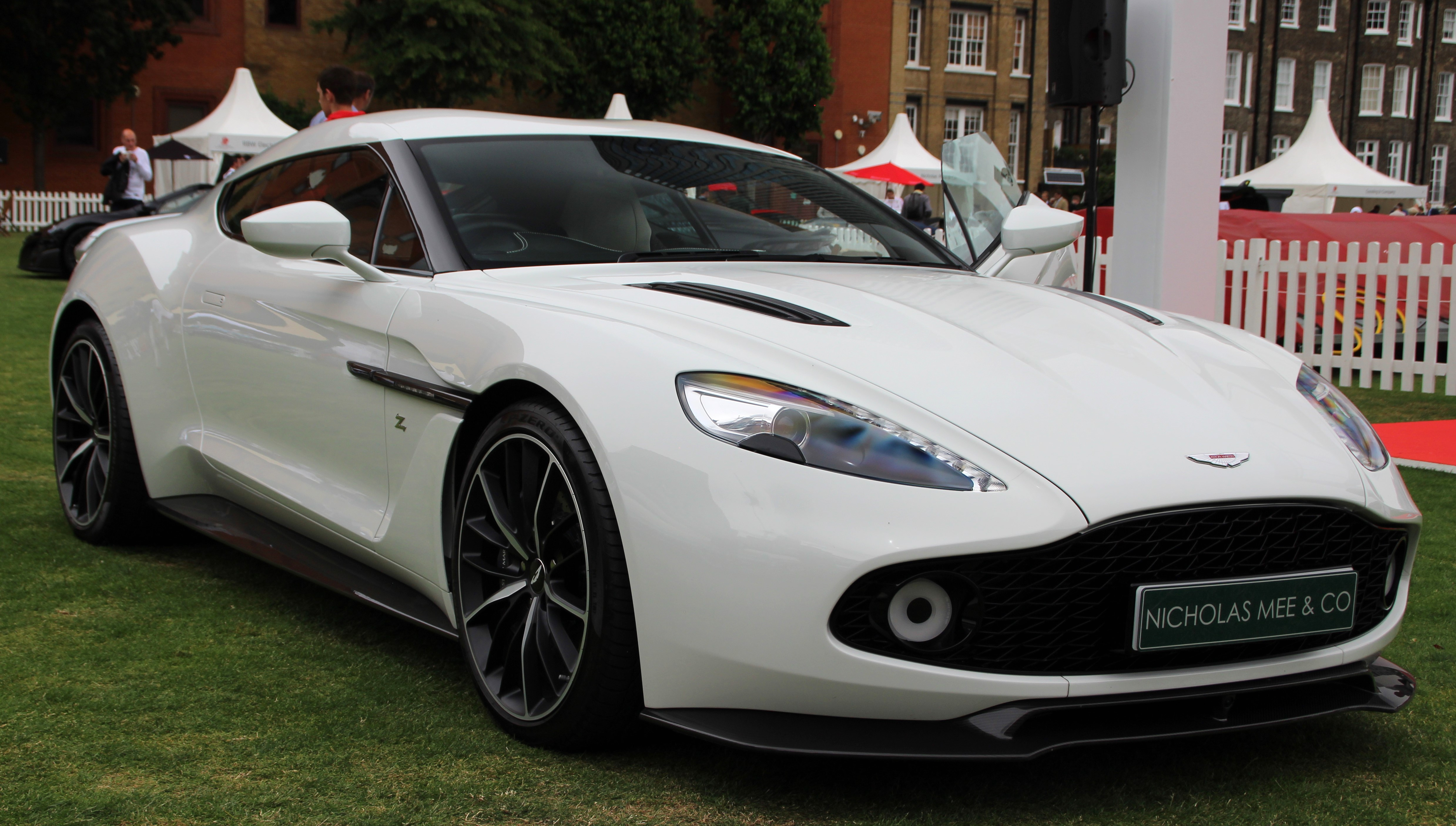
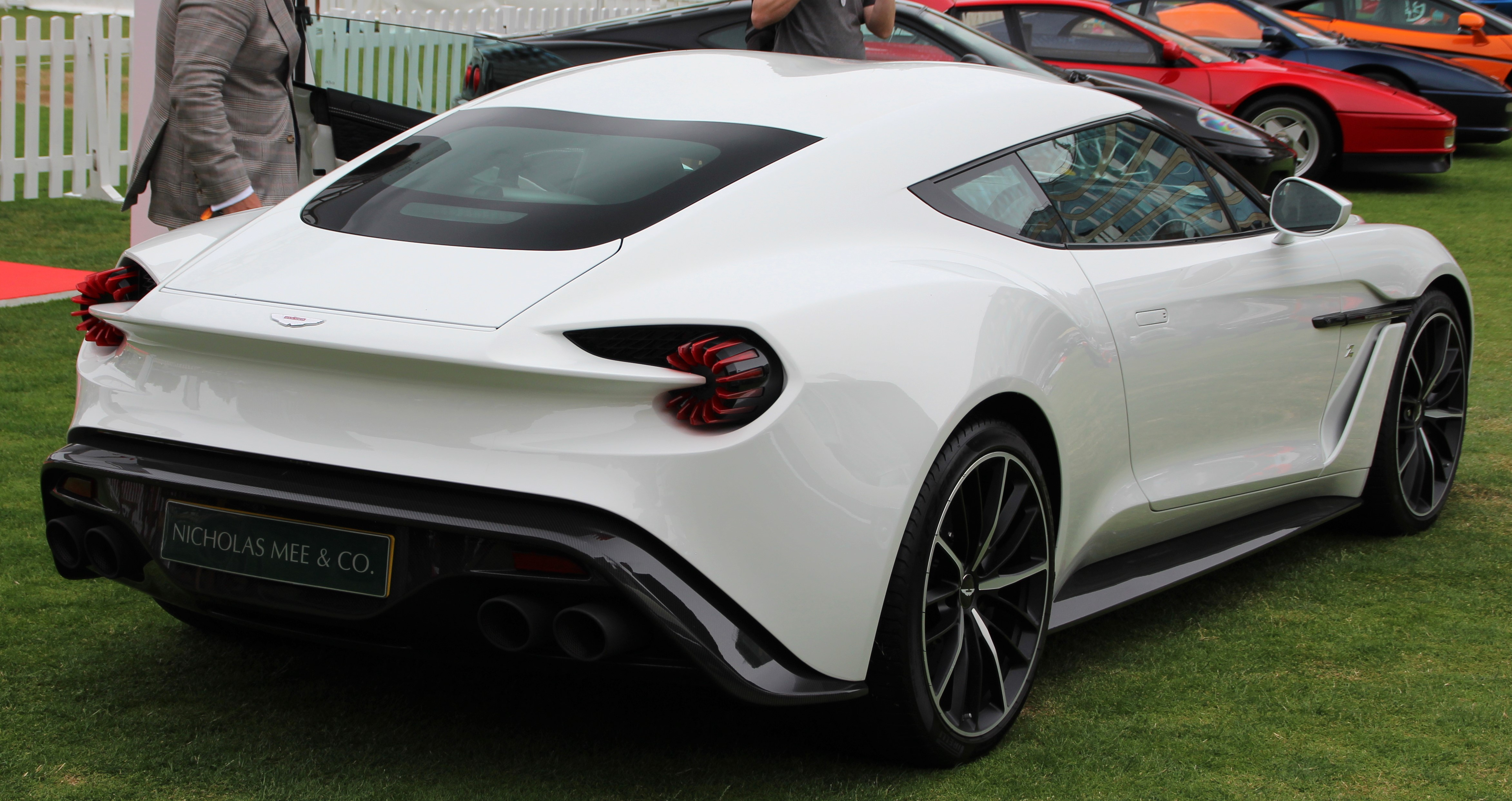
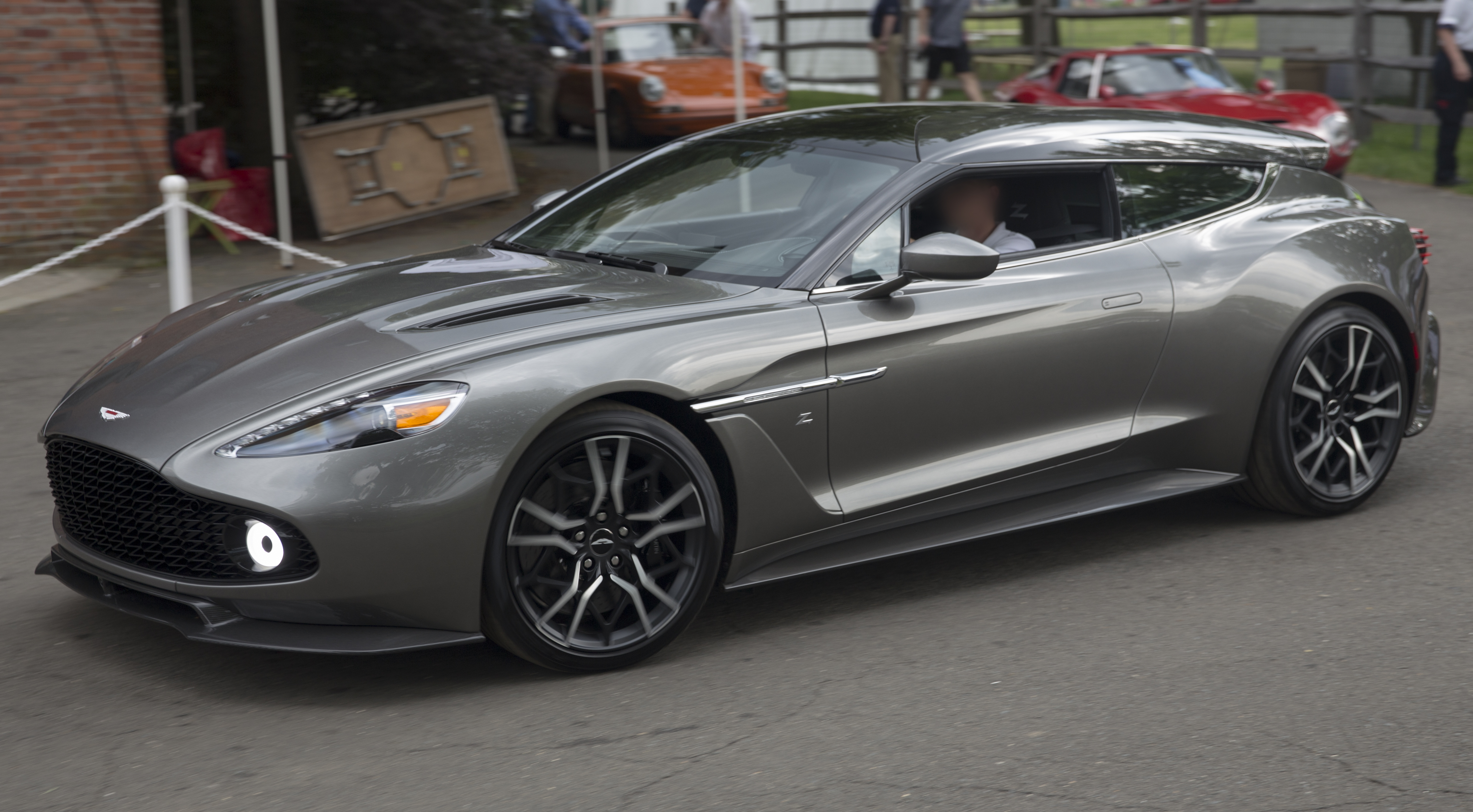
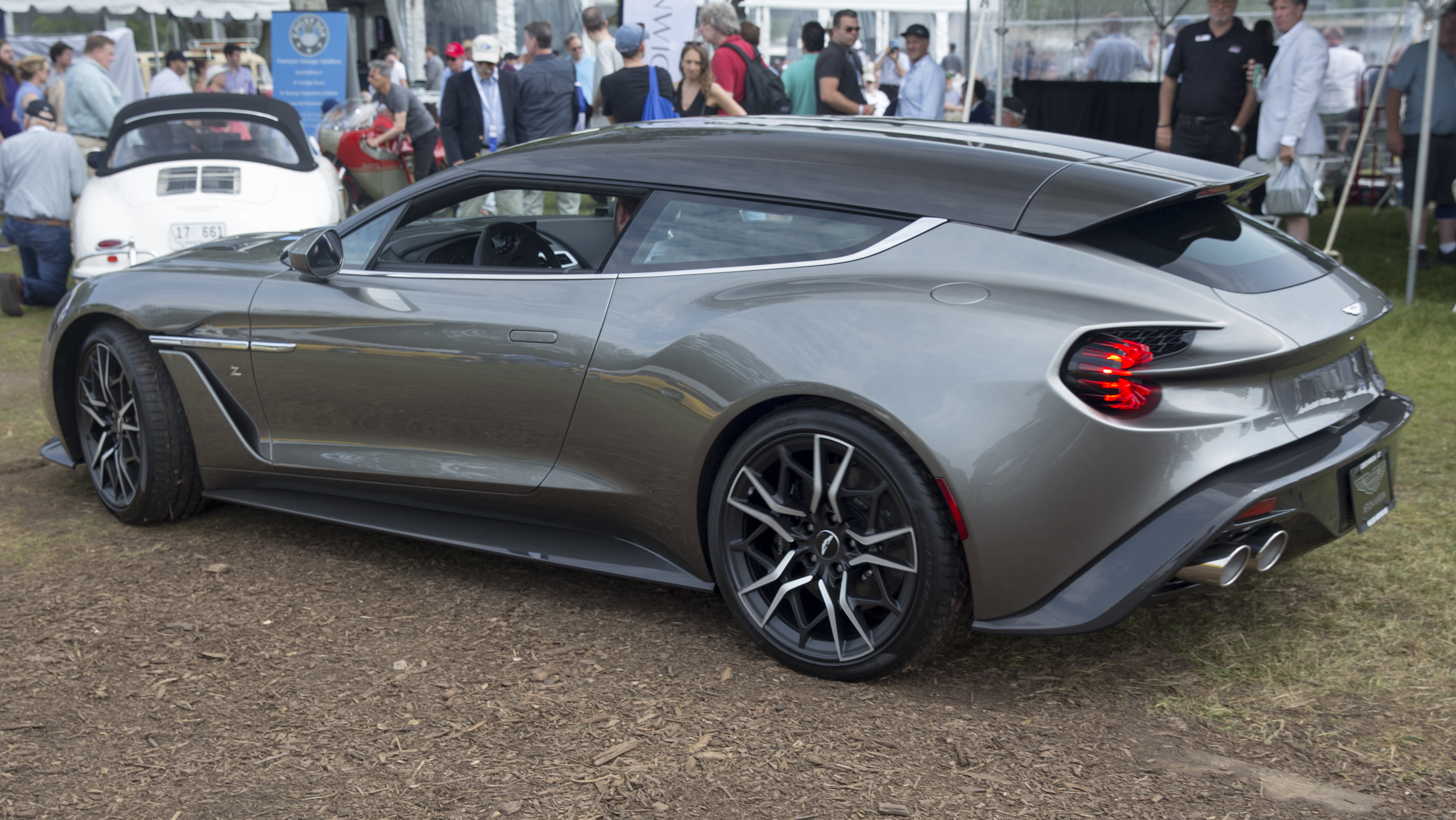
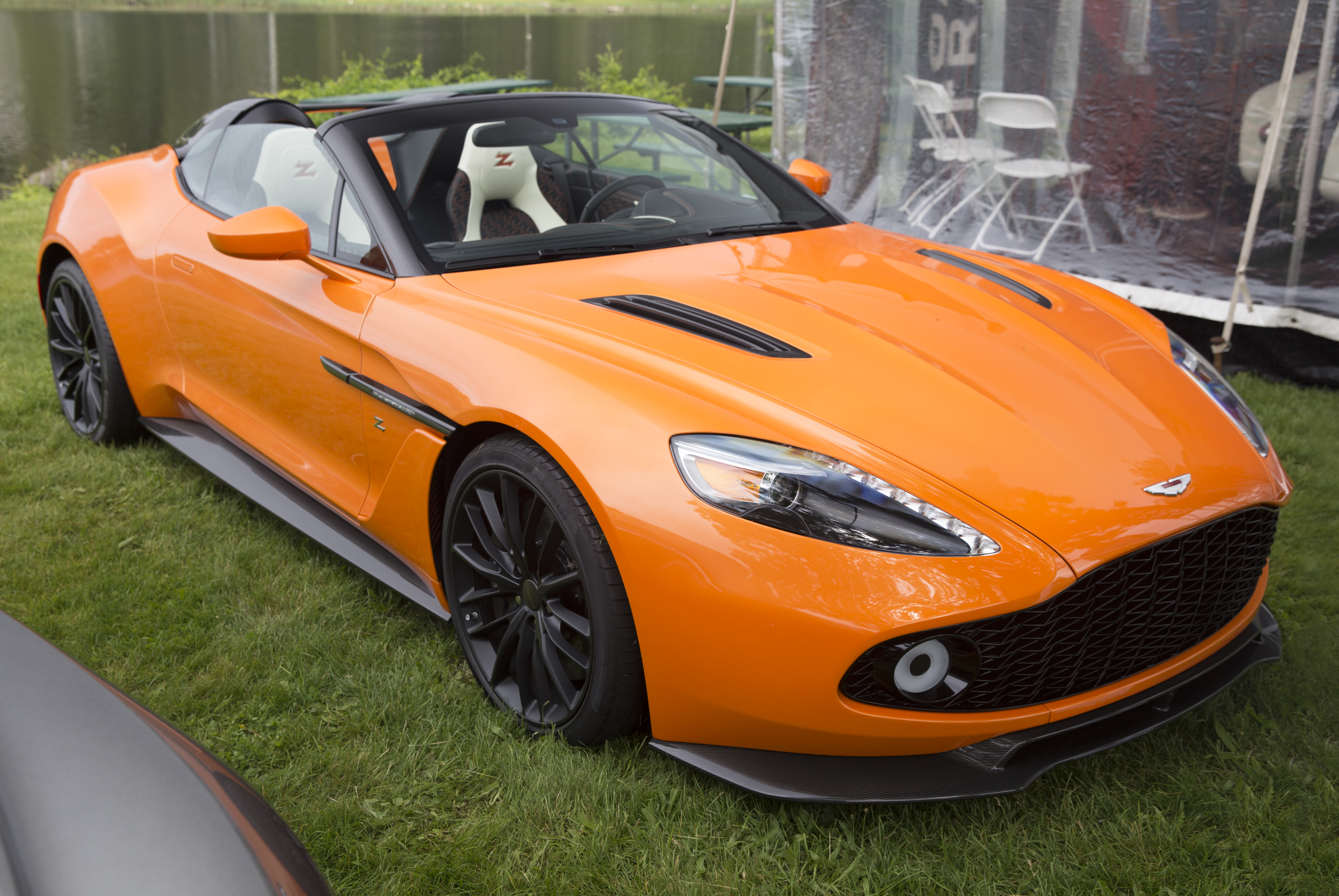
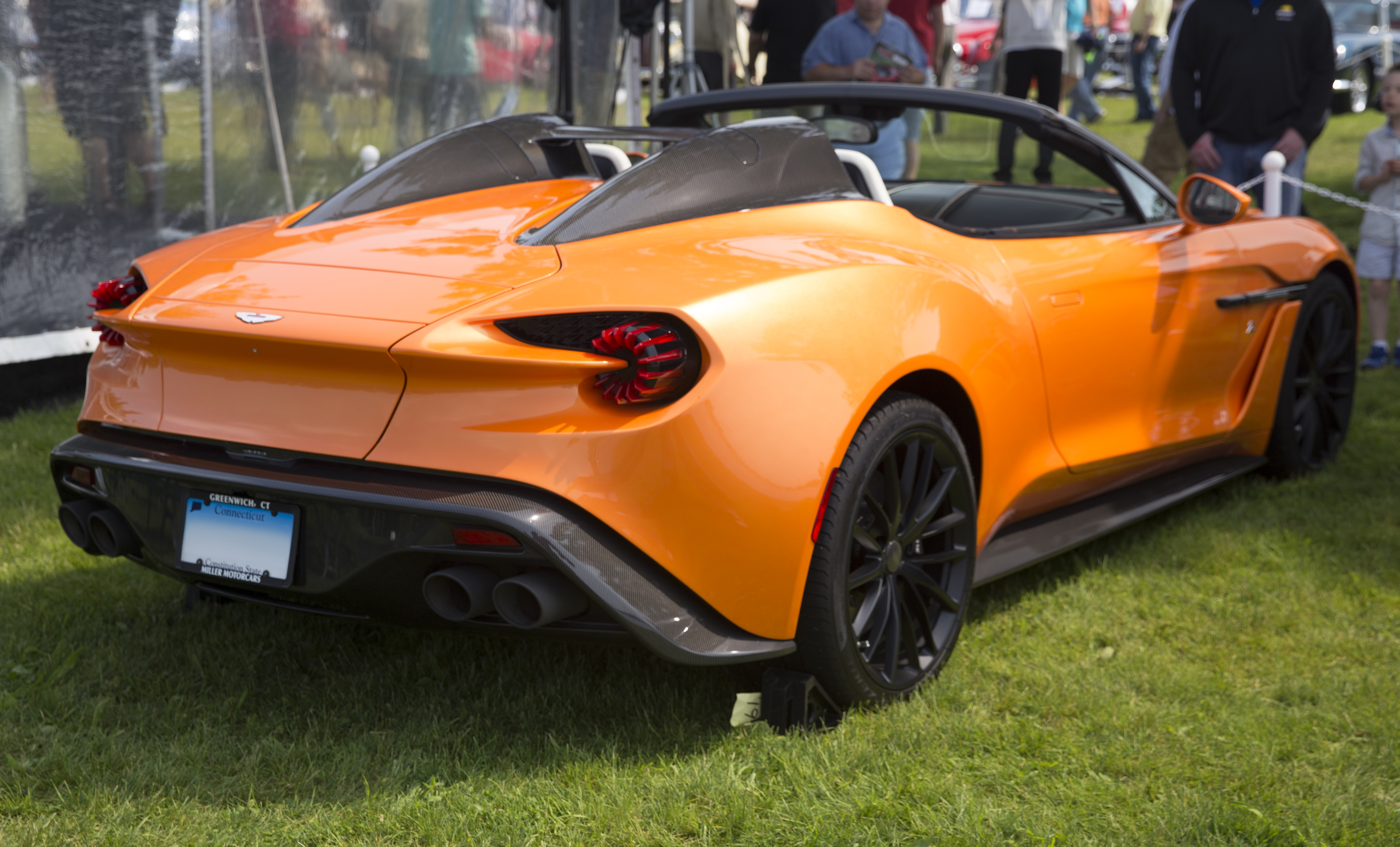
Top to bottom: coupe, shooting brake and Speedster. The convertible model is not pictured.

Aston Martin produced four versions of the Vanquish Zagato, a collaboration between Aston Martin and the coachbuilding company Zagato, comprising such body styles as the coupe, convertible, shooting brake, and "Speedster". Aston Martin introduced a concept version of Vanquish Zagato at the May 2016 edition of the Concorso d'Eleganza Villa d'Este. On June 21, 2016, Aston Martin announced plans to produce a Vanquish Zagato coupe in a limited series of 99 units. The first vehicles were delivered in early 2017.

Aston Martin debuted the convertible version—called the Vanquish Zagato Volante—at the 2016 edition of the Pebble Beach Concours d'Elegance; deliveries also began in 2017 and 99 units were produced. At the 2017 edition of the Pebble Beach Concours d'Elegance, Aston Martin unveiled the Vanquish Zagato Speedster, a roadster version of the car; 28 units were manufactured. In August 2017, Aston Martin announced the final model of the series, the shooting brake, of which 99 were produced. In comparison to the normal Vanquish, the Zagato incorporates a larger grille with integrated fog lamps, a more prominent rear spoiler and circular tail-lights.

== Reception ==
The journalist Jeremy Clarkson appreciated the Vanquish's performance and styling and referred to it as "a lovely car [...] flowing and smooth when you want it to be, raucous and mad when you don't and utterly, bewitchingly beautiful always." Clarkson also praised its "delightful" interior, though one of his friends, A. A. Gill, disagreed, complaining that "[i]t's like being in one of those executive-desk drawer dividers [...] I feel like I'm a roll of Sellotape". The Independent's John Simister criticised the car's two small rear seats, describing them "largely pointless", but he said that the engine sounded "magnificently crisp and rich". Jaclyn Trop, writing for The Boston Globe, described the Vanquish S as a "bone-shaker" and "the Mother of God", and referred to its engine as "thunderous". The car reviewers Edmunds opined that its "acceleration is impressive, though not as terrifying as similar supercars", while believing that its performance was incongruous with the high price.

Mike Duff of the magazine Car and Driver stated that the interior of the Vanquish S features "beautiful materials and [an] elegant design[,] mostly distracting occupants from the reality that there really isn't very much to play with". Duff also held concerns with the Vanquish's usage of the VH platform, noting that "plenty of the stuff you'd find on a mainstream car costing a tenth of the [price] just isn't there". Philip King of the newspaper The Australian praised the Vanquish's "sweetly precise" throttle and brakes but criticised its ageing design, stating that "next to the DB11, the Vanquish looks muscular but old-fashioned".

== Notes, references and sources ==
=== Sources ===
==== Books ====
- Noakes, Andrew (2019) [2017]. Aston Martin DB: 70 Years. London: Quarto Publishing Group UK. ISBN 978-1-7813-1928-4.
- Taylor, James (2024). Aston Martin DB9 and Vanquish: The Complete Story. Wiltshire: Crowood Press. ISBN 978-0-7198-4316-7.
- Vale, Matthew (2022). Aston Martin: The Complete Story. Wiltshire: Crowood Press. ISBN 978-0-7198-4119-4.

==== Print magazines ====
- Ashraf, Yousef (October 2023). "Best buys: grand tourer". Evo. No. 314. pp. 122–127. ISSN 1464-2786.
- Delorenzo, Matt (August 2012). "2014 Aston Martin Vanquish". Road & Track. Vol. 63, no. 12. pp. 14–15.
- Lieberman, Jonny (January 2013). "Big sexy". Motor Trend. Vol. 65, no. 1. pp. 100–104. ISSN 0027-2094.
- Meaden, Richard (March 2016). "The final hurrah". Octane. No. 153. pp. 100–108. ISSN 1740-0023.
- Rix, Jack (10 October 2012). "Aston Vanquish driven". Auto Express. No. 1238. pp. 8–10. ISSN 0954-8866.

==== News ====
- "100 years later, Aston Martin true to classy sports car lineage". Austin American-Statesman. 30 May 2014. p. D2. Archived from the original on 19 June 2024.
- "2018 Aston Martin Vanquish S Volante". The Boston Globe. 16 December 2017. p. D1.
- "Aston Martin reveals AM 310 Vanquish". Calgary Herald. 22 June 2012. p. 72. Archived from the original on 19 June 2024.
- "Aston Martin rolls out two more limited Zagato versions of its Vanquish". The Leader-Post. 25 August 2017. p. 27. Archived from the original on 20 June 2024.
- "Aston Martin unveils Vanquish Zagato". Waterloo Region Record. 27 May 2016. p. 23. Archived from the original on 21 June 2024.
- "Aural delight". National Post. 12 October 2012. p. 16. Archived from the original on 21 June 2024.
- "Can Aston Vanquish the competition?". The Daily Telegraph. 6 October 2012. p. 142. Archived from the original on 21 June 2024.
- Clarkson, Jeremy (15 December 2014). "The Clarkson review: 2015 Aston Martin Vanquish". The Sunday Times. Archived from the original on 20 June 2024.
- "Concours d'Elegance: Fantasy, fun". Santa Maria Times. 31 August 2013. p. B10. Archived from the original on 20 June 2024.
- "Cover story". The Daily Telegraph. 27 March 2004. p. 80. Archived from the original on 17 June 2024.
- Dron, Will (12 December 2014). "Ian Callum designed the Aston Martin DB9, but to whom is it often credited?". The Sunday Times. Archived from the original on 5 April 2024.
- Eden, Richard (8 July 2012). "Barton is back". The Sunday Telegraph. p. 11.
- Fleming, Charles (16 November 2016). "L.A. Auto Show 2016: Aston Martin Vanquish S super GT car". Los Angeles Times. Archived from the original on 20 June 2024.
- Frankel, Andrew (17 March 2014). "First drive review: Aston Martin Vanquish Volante". The Sunday Times. Archived from the original on 19 June 2024.
- Frankel, Andrew (16 November 2013). "Pay top dollar and pootle around". The Australian.
- "Goodwood Festival of Speed: Aston Martin Vanquish". The Daily Telegraph. 1 July 2012. Archived from the original on 18 June 2024.
- "Global convergence under way in the automotive world". Los Angeles Times. 10 March 2005. p. 65. Archived from the original on 17 June 2024.
- King, Philip (8 April 2017). "Charmed, I'm sure". The Australian.
- Leu, Richard (23 June 2016). "Aston Martin Vanquish Zagato coupe is go". Bangkok Post. Archived from the original on 20 June 2024.
- Martin, Guy (7 April 2015). "Guy Martin drives Aston Martin Vanquish Carbon Edition". The Sunday Times. Archived from the original on 17 April 2023.
- Mills, James (22 June 2016). "Dreams do come true: Aston Martin to build 99 Vanquish Zagato coupés". The Sunday Times. Archived from the original on 8 August 2022.
- "In pictures: 2014 Aston Martin Vanquish". The Globe and Mail. 10 October 2012. Archived from the original on 19 June 2024.
- "New world class facilities". The Springfield News-Leader. 25 December 2003. p. 65. Archived from the original on 17 June 2024.
- "Nobody does it better". The Independent. 21 October 2012. p. 141. Archived from the original on 19 June 2024.
- "Orders for Aston Martin's V8 Vantage now being placed". Palm Beach Daily News. 9 February 2006. p. 22. Archived from the original on 12 May 2024.
- "The brains behind the world's most beautiful cars". The Windsor Star. 25 February 2014. p. 19. Archived from the original on 18 June 2024.
- Scholes, William (24 November 2016). "Aston Martin vanquishes winter blues". The Irish News. Archived from the original on 20 June 2024.
- Smith, Giles (7 October 2012). "Aston Martin Vanquish: Go conquer Kettering, 007". The Times. Archived from the original on 21 June 2024.
- "Sports cars still central Aston Martin". Los Angeles Times. 14 December 2013. p. 26. Archived from the original on 19 June 2024.
- "Vanquish handsomely assumes spot atop the lineup". Austin American-Statesman. 15 June 2013. p. D2. Archived from the original on 19 June 2024.
- "Volante tops stunning Vanquish line". The Standard. 8 November 2013. p. 24. Archived from the original on 19 June 2024.

==== Online magazines and websites ====
- "2014 Aston Martin Vanquish review notes". Autoweek. 5 September 2013. Archived from the original on 19 June 2024.
- "2015 Aston Martin Vanquish review, pricing, and specs". Car and Driver. 14 May 2019. Archived from the original on 18 June 2024.
- "2018 Aston Martin Vanquish specifications". Motor Trend. 20 May 2017. Archived from the original on 19 June 2024.
- "2019 Aston Martin Vanquish review, pricing, and specs". Car and Driver. 14 May 2019. Archived from the original on 18 June 2024.
- "Aston Martin Vanquish (2014-2018) review". Auto Express. 11 July 2018. Archived from the original on 19 June 2024.
- Barry, Ben (25 October 2012). "Aston Martin Vanquish (2012) review". Car. Archived from the original on 18 June 2024.
- Bond, Paul (19 June 2013). "Aston Martin Vanquish Volante revealed". Auto Express. Archived from the original on 8 April 2023.
- Bovingdon, Jethro (4 November 2014). "Aston Martin Vanquish review and pictures". Evo. Archived from the original on 18 June 2024.
- Burgess, Rachel (20 August 2016). "Aston Martin Vanquish Zagato Volante revealed at Pebble Beach". Autocar. Archived from the original on 20 June 2024.
- Cropley, Steve (29 June 2012). "Aston Martin Vanquish gets world debut at Goodwood". Autocar. Archived from the original on 18 June 2024.
- Dobie, Stephen (15 November 2016). "Meet the 600bhp Aston Martin Vanquish S". Top Gear. BBC. Archived from the original on 20 June 2024.
- Duff, Mike (29 January 2015). "2015 Aston Martin Vanquish test and review". Car and Driver. Archived from the original on 19 June 2024.
- Duff, Mike (28 December 2016). "2018 Aston Martin Vanquish test and review". Car and Driver.
- Gall, Jared (5 October 2012). "2013 Aston Martin Vanquish". Car and Driver. Archived from the original on 13 April 2024.
- Gitlin, Jonathan M. (15 August 2017). "Aston Martin and Zagato team up again for Pebble Beach". Ars Technica. Archived from the original on 20 June 2024.
- Ingrassia, Paul (17 August 2013). "Lincolns join Bugattis at Pebble Beach Concours d'Elegance car show". Reuters.
- Jurnecka, Rory (20 August 2012). "Vanquished! Aston Martin brings its newest sports car to Monterey". Motor Trend.
- Kingston, Lewis (16 November 2016a). "Aston Martin unveils 595bhp Vanquish S". Car. Archived from the original on 20 June 2024.
- Kingston, Lewis (20 August 2016b). "Aston Martin Vanquish Zagato Volante unveiled at Pebble Beach". Car. Archived from the original on 13 April 2024.
- Kozak, Graham (28 May 2012). "Aston Martin AM310 makes a quiet debut at the Concorso d'Eleganza Villa d'Este". Autoweek. Archived from the original on 30 June 2022.
- "LA Auto Show 2016: The biggest car news announced this week in Los Angeles". The Verge. 21 November 2016. Archived from the original on 20 June 2024.
- Lieberman, Jonny (5 October 2012). "Aston Martin Vanquish first drive". Motor Trend. Archived from the original on 19 June 2024.
- Lindberg, Austin (29 May 2012a). "2013 Aston Martin DBS previewed by AM310 concept". Car and Driver. Archived from the original on 18 June 2024.
- Lindberg, Austin (5 June 2012b). "DBS replacement will be called Vanquish". Car and Driver. Archived from the original on 18 June 2024.
- Lingeman, Jake (20 May 2016). "Zagato and Aston pen another stunner for Villa d'Este". Autoweek. Archived from the original on 20 June 2024.
- Meaden, Richard; Paice, Simon (20 June 2012). "New Aston Martin Vanquish". Evo. Archived from the original on 18 June 2024.
- Meiners, Jens (19 June 2012). "2013 Aston Martin AM 310 Vanquish". Car and Driver. Archived from the original on 19 June 2024.
- McCausland, Evan (19 June 2012). "First look: 2013 Aston Martin Vanquish". Motor Trend. Archived from the original on 24 March 2024.
- Okulski, Travis (23 May 2016). "The Aston Martin Vanquish Zagato Is Breathtaking". Yahoo! News.
- Perkins, Chris (21 June 2016). "Aston Martin Will Build The Stunning Vanquish Zagato". Road and Track. Archived from the original on 20 June 2024.
- Pollard, Tim (20 June 2012). "Aston Martin Vanquish (2012) first official pictures". Car. Archived from the original on 21 June 2024.
- Pollard, Tim (26 July 2017). "Speedsters and Volantes: the latest Aston Martin Zagatos spied". Car.
- Prior, Matt (19 July 2017). "Aston Martin Vanquish S Volante 2017 first drive". Autocar.
- Rogers, Cameron; Yekikian, Nick; Simone, Clint; Bierenkoven, Chase. "2014 Aston Martin Vanquish review & ratings". Edmunds. Archived from the original on 21 June 2024.
- Siler, Steve (8 August 2014). "Aston Martin Rapide S, Vanquish get ZF eight-speed automatic; both cars get faster, more efficient". Car and Driver. Archived from the original on 19 June 2024.
- Sorokanich, Bob (25 October 2018). "Someone Bought the Plans and Tooling for the Aston Martin Vanquish". Road and Track. Archived from the original on 27 October 2022.
- Stevens, Tim (9 June 2014). "2014 Aston Martin Vanquish Coupe review: Aston's latest Vanquish is a gorgeous grand tourer". CNET. Archived from the original on 19 June 2024.
- Vettraino, J. P. (9 December 2013). "Aston Martin Vanquish Volante first drive". Autoweek. Archived from the original on 20 June 2024.
- Wasef, Basem (8 October 2012). "2014 Aston Martin Vanquish first drive review, price, specs and photos". Road and Track. Archived from the original on 18 June 2024.
- Wernle, Bradford (5 October 2003). "Upcoming DB9 coupe marks a new start for Aston Martin". Autoweek. Archived from the original on 31 March 2023.
