= Lagonda Taraf =

British luxury saloon

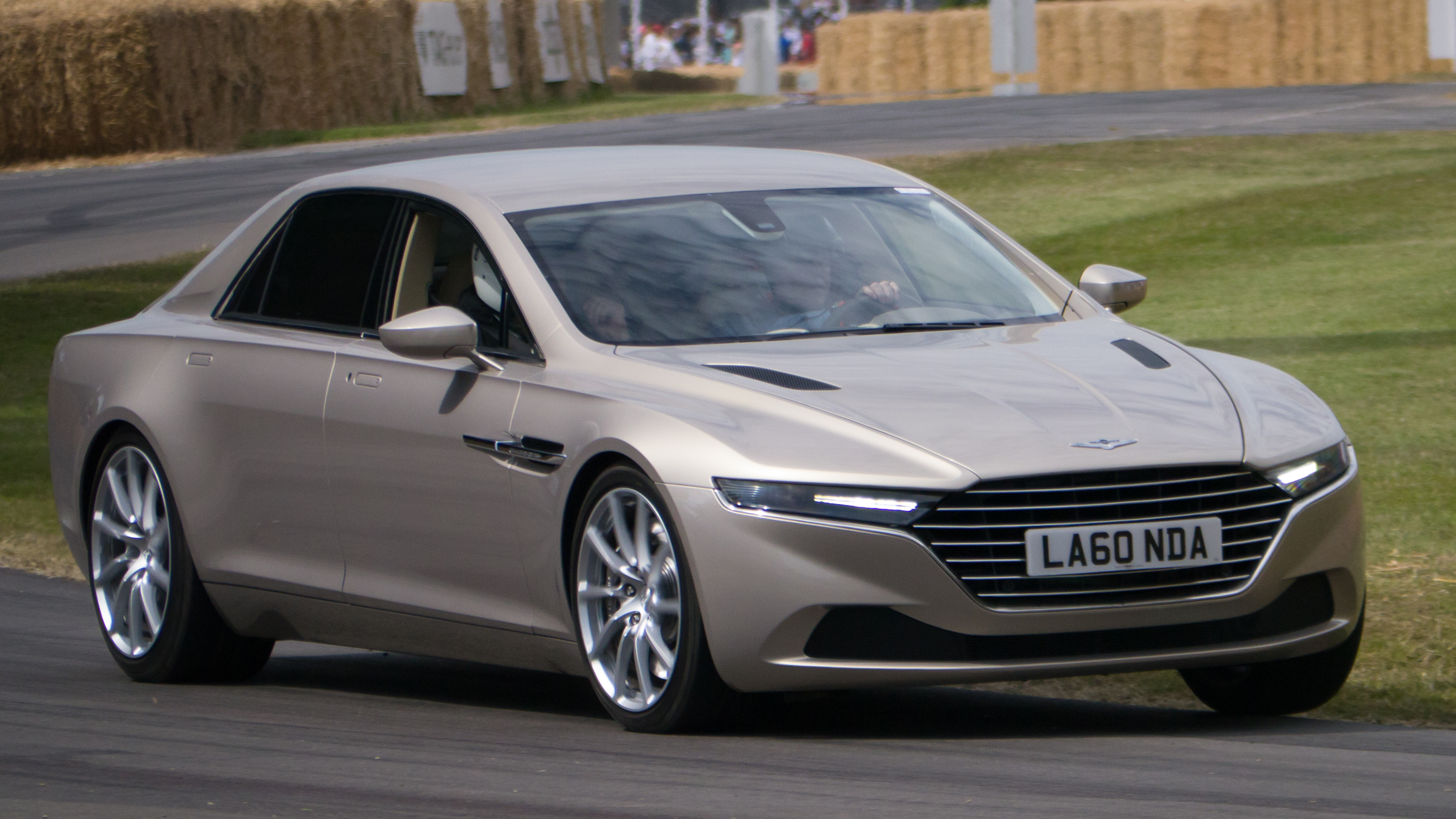
- At the Goodwood Festival of Speed, 2015

Overview
- Manufacturer: Aston Martin
- Production: 2015–2016; 120 units
- Assembly: United Kingdom: Gaydon, Warwickshire
- Designer: Marek Reichman (2014)

Body and chassis
- Class: Full-size luxury car
- Body style: 4-door saloon
- Layout: Front-engine, rear-wheel-drive
- Platform: Aston Martin VH
- Related: Aston Martin DB9; Aston Martin Rapide

Powertrain
- Engine: 5.9 L Aston Martin V12
- Transmission: 8-speed ZF 8HP70 (Touchtronic III) automatic

Dimensions
- Wheelbase: 3,189 mm (125.6 in)
- Length: 5,396.5 mm (212.5 in)
- Width: 1,917.5 mm (75.5 in)
- Height: 1,389 mm (54.7 in)
- Kerb weight: 4,398 lb (1,995 kg)

The Lagonda Taraf is a full-size luxury car that was produced in 2015 and 2016 by the British carmaker Aston Martin under its Lagonda marque. Designed by Marek Reichman and considered "the finest of fast cars" by Aston Martin, the vehicle is based upon the vertical–horizontal platform, which it shares with the DB9 and Rapide. The Taraf debuted in Dubai in 2014, with manufacture commencing in the subsequent year at the facility in Gaydon, Warwickshire. Initially intended for sale exclusively in the Middle Eastern market with a limited run of 100 units, Aston Martin later expanded the car's availability to several other countries and ultimately built 120.

The Taraf has a 0–100 km/h (0–62 mph) acceleration time of 4.4 seconds and a maximum speed of 314 km/h (195 mph). The car features Aston Martin's 5.9-litre engine and an eight-speed automatic transmission manufactured by ZF Friedrichshafen. At its launch, the Taraf was priced at over US$1 million, making it the most expensive saloon in the world. While car critics generally praised its handling, they heavily criticized its exorbitant price.

== History ==
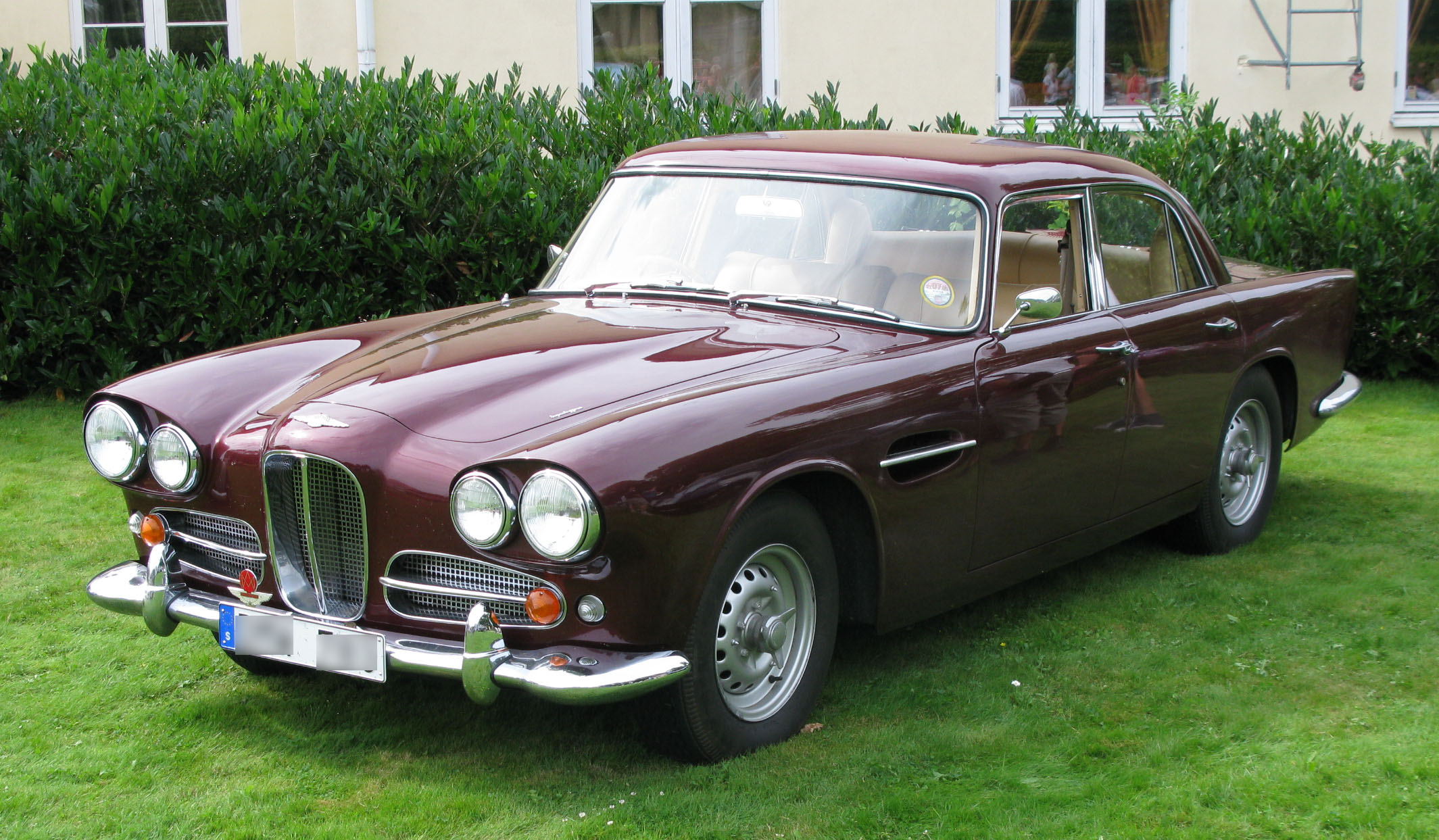
The Lagonda Rapide was Aston Martin's first four-door car.

The Lagonda brand was established in 1906 by the businessman Wilbur Gunn. The 1935 Le Mans 24 Hour race was won with a Lagonda M45R driven by John Stuart Hindmarsh and Luis Fontés. When the Lagonda Rapide V12 launched in 1939, it was the most expensive car in the United States.

In 1947, the entrepreneur and industrialist David Brown acquired both Lagonda and Aston Martin. In 1961, Lagonda introduced the Rapide, (Note: Not to be confused with the Aston Martin Rapide from 2010) the company's earliest four-door automobile. Its production ended in 1966 after fifty-five units had been manufactured. In 1974, Aston Martin introduced its second four-door model, the Lagonda, which was produced until 1990, when 645 units had been made. The Aston Martin Rapide, their third four-door model, was revealed in 2009 at the International Motor Show Germany. In the same year, Aston Martin chose to revive the Lagonda brand to explore various market segments and commemorate Lagonda's centenary.

The development of the Taraf began in February 2014 at Aston Martin's design studio in Gaydon, Warwickshire, under the codename "Project Comet". The name "Taraf" means "ultimate luxury" in the Arabic language. The project was carried out by Aston Martin's Q division, which specialises in creating bespoke cars and customising existing models to meet customer specifications. The design studio completed the final full-sized model within eight months of the initial studio sketches. Marek Reichman credited the swift execution to the lessons learned from producing the One-77, which took two years to progress from design to completion.

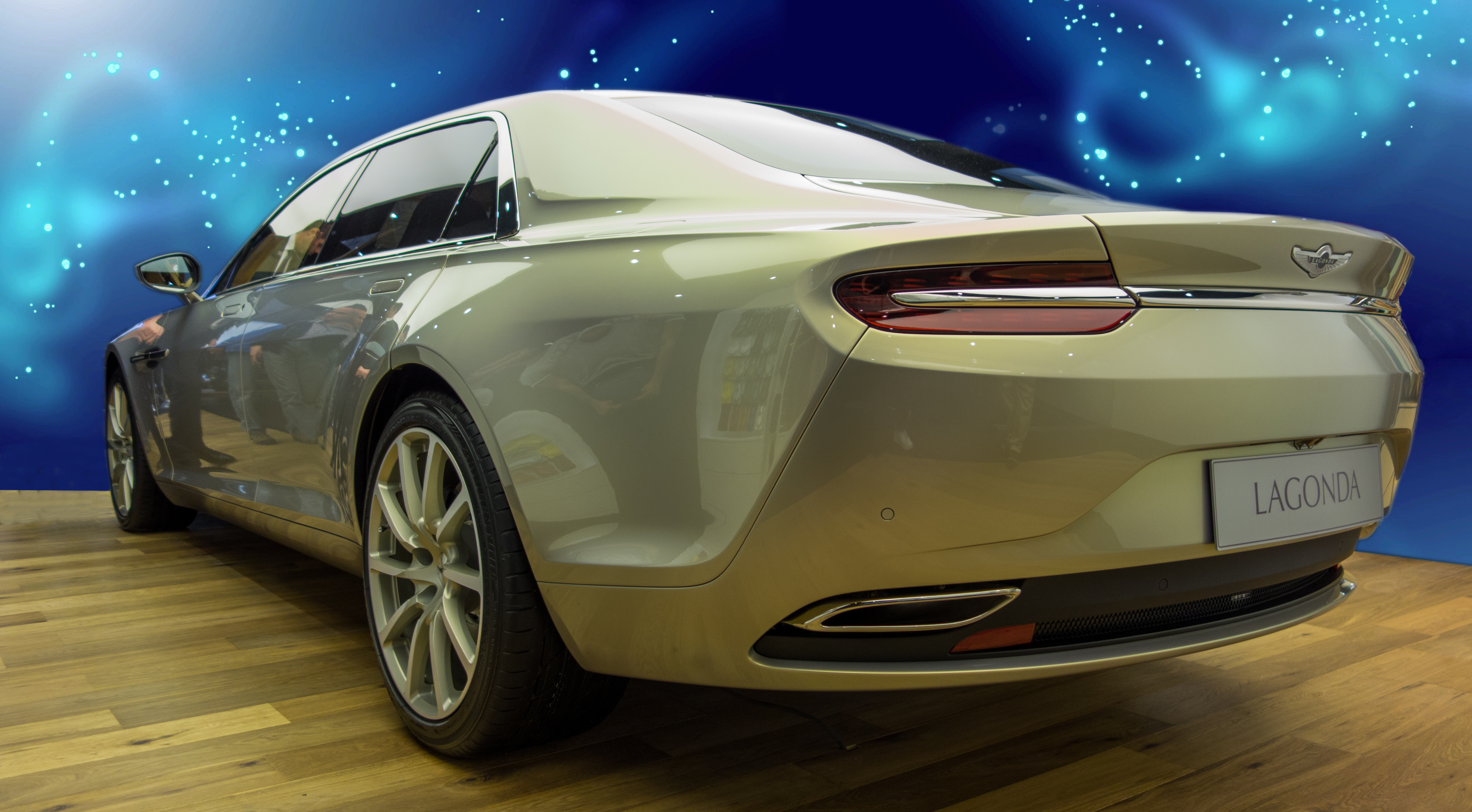
Rear view

As part of its extensive testing programme, Aston Martin took a nearly production-ready Taraf model to Oman, where it underwent approximately 14,000 miles (23,000 km) of testing for more than four weeks. Most of the test was to assess how the Lagonda's components—primarily the air conditioning system and interior trims—handled the extreme heat, with temperatures ranging from 30 to 50 °C (86 to 122 °F). During the test, Aston Martin reported that the car was already performing "beyond expectations".

The Taraf debuted in Dubai in November 2014. The official manufacture began in the subsequent year at the facility in Gaydon, Warwickshire, with Aston Martin stating that 100 cars would be built exclusively for the Middle Eastern market. However, the chief executive officer of Aston Martin Andy Palmer expanded the potential markets for the car to include Europe, the United States, Singapore and South Africa. He also had the total production goal increased to 200 units. In April 2016, the car was called the most expensive four-door saloon in the world, priced at over US$1 million. (Note: £696,000 in the UK) The manufacture of the Taraf ceased at the end of 2016; 120 units were ultimately built.

== Design and technology ==
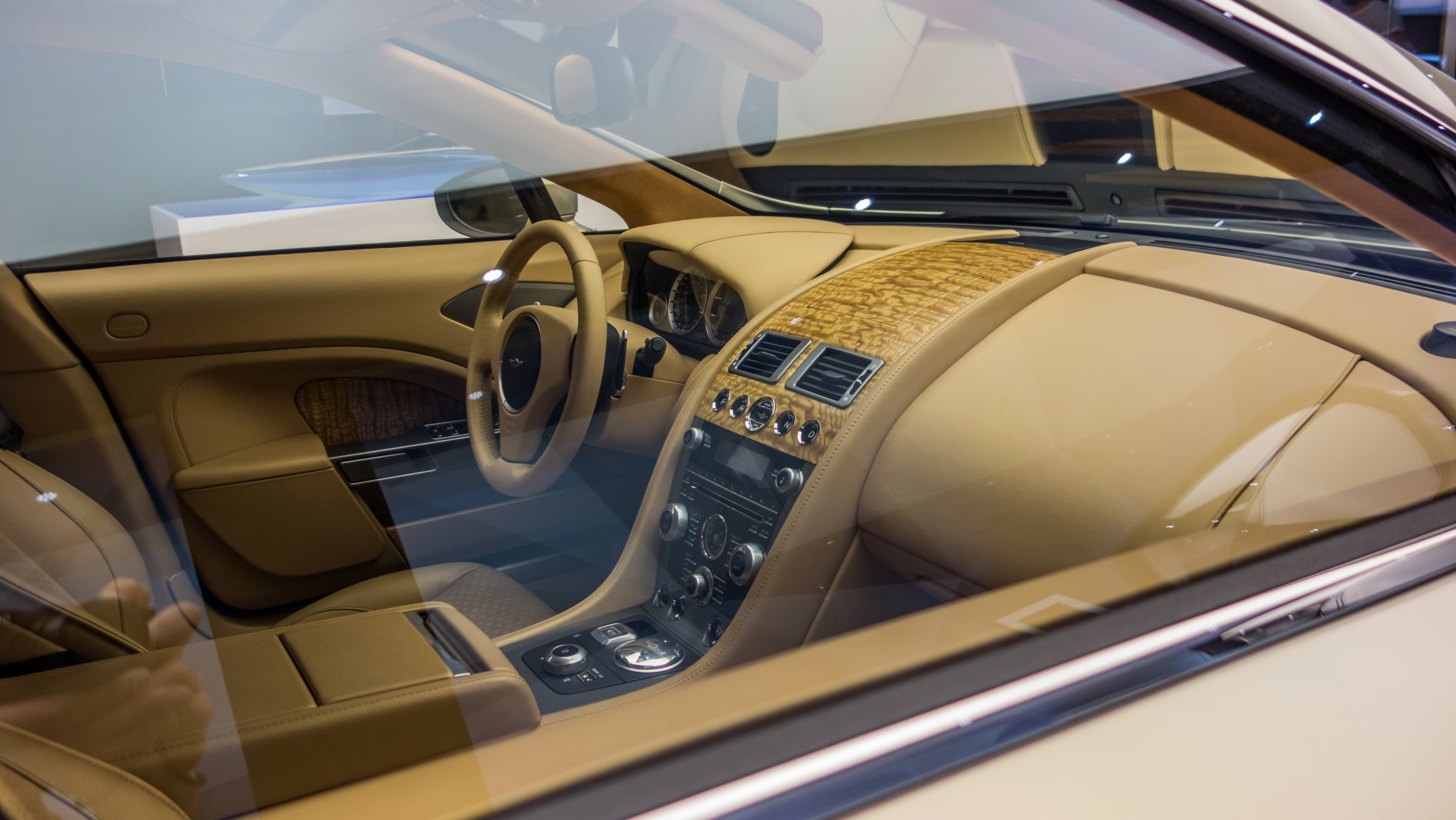
Interior

Considered "the finest of fast cars" by Aston Martin, the Taraf uses the vertical/horizontal platform—which it shares with the DB9 and Rapide—and extensively incorporates aluminium. Instead of the Rapide's pressed aluminium body, the Taraf features a lightweight carbon fibre exterior; consequently, despite the latter's larger size, both cars are of similar weight. The Taraf incorporates anti-roll bars, adaptive dampers, and a double wishbone suspension system supported by coil springs. The interior of the vehicle incorporated elements from other Aston Martin models, including console-mounted push-button transmission controls, an advanced infotainment system, a 1,000-watt Bang & Olufsen BeoSound audio system, and leather upholstery. Buyers could choose from various trims, including wood and carbon fibre. The car's extended wheelbase provided enhanced legroom for the rear-seat passengers.

The Taraf features Aston Martin's 5.9-litre V12 engine, which generates a power output of 547 PS (402 kW; 540 hp) at 6,650 revolutions per minute (rpm) and a torque output of 630 N⋅m (465 lb⋅ft) at 5,500 rpm. The Taraf has a 0–100 km/h (0–62 mph) acceleration time of 4.4 seconds and a maximum speed of 314 km/h (195 mph). The engine was assembled at Ford's bespoke engine facility in Niehl, Cologne, Germany. The Taraf is a four-door luxury saloon car with a rear-wheel drive layout and front engine placement. The vehicle features an eight-speed Touchtronic III automatic transmission developed by ZF Friedrichshafen.

== Reception ==
The Taraf has received mixed—but mostly positive—reviews, with most critics noting the steep price as its primary drawback. Jason Barlow of the magazine Top Gear noted that "[i]t doesn't ride as well as its rivals, but despite its size and physical presence, it handles better than you'd expect". Mike Duff of Car and Driver emphasised the light yet responsive hydraulic steering and the chassis's impressive lateral grip, even in wet conditions. He also noted that "[t]he brakes lack much initial bite but have plenty of stopping power when worked more forcefully," adding that it is "downright hard not to drive at the sort of speeds that would produce complaints from any rear-seat occupants—or possibly a sharp tap from a gold-tipped cane".

Reviewing for Motor Trend, Angus MacKenzie wrote that "[t]his $1 million saloon, hand-built by Aston Martin, costs more than five times as much as a Mercedes-Maybach S600. Yet it matters little to the people who will buy the Taraf that the Maybach is technically the more accomplished ultra-luxury saloon". The Autocar magazine also criticised its price, noting that for the same amount, one could buy a Rolls-Royce Phantom Coupé, a Bentley Mulsanne and a Range Rover SV Autobiography, but acknowledged the "unmatched exclusivity" of the car.
