= Aston Martin Rapide =

British executive car

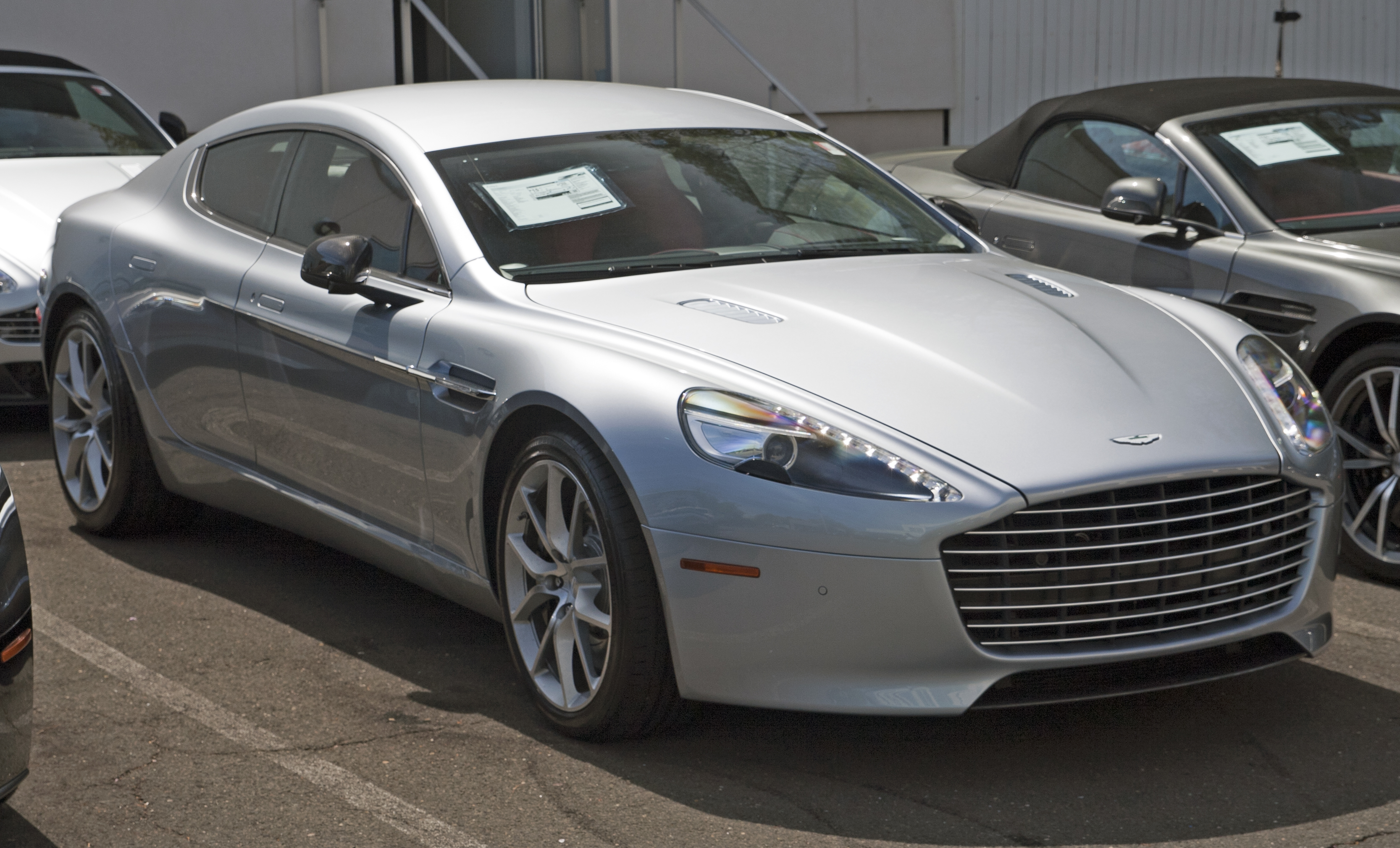
- 2014 Aston Martin Rapide S

Overview
- Manufacturer: Aston Martin Lagonda Limited
- Production: May 2010 – 2020
- Assembly: Austria: Graz (Magna Steyr: 2010–2012); United Kingdom: Gaydon, Warwickshire (2012–2020)
- Designer: Marek Reichman

Body and chassis
- Class: Executive
- Body style: 5-door liftback
- Layout: Front-mid-engine, rear-wheel-drive; Rear-motor, rear-wheel-drive (Rapide E)
- Platform: Aston Martin VH
- Doors: Swan-wing
- Related: Aston Martin DB9; Aston Martin Virage; Aston Martin Vanquish; Aston Martin Rapide Bertone Jet 2+2; Lagonda Taraf

Powertrain
- Engine: 5.9 L AM11 V12 (2010–2014); 5.9 L AM29 V12 (2014–2020)
- Transmission: 6-speed ZF 6HP 26 (Touchtronic II) automatic (2010–2014); 8-speed ZF 8HP70 (Touchtronic III) automatic (2014–2020); Xtrac Bespoke P1289 ILEV automatic (Rapide E)
- Battery: 65 kWh lithium-ion (Rapide E)

Dimensions
- Wheelbase: 2,990 mm (117.7 in)
- Length: 5,019 mm (197.6 in)
- Width: 1,928 mm (75.9 in)
- Height: 1,359 mm (53.5 in)
- Kerb weight: 1,950–1,990 kg (4,299–4,387 lb)

The Aston Martin Rapide (/rəˈpiːd/ rə-PEED) is an executive saloon car that was produced by the British carmaker Aston Martin from 2010 until 2020. Aston Martin began development of the Rapide in 2005 as the company's first series produced four-door automobile. (Note: Aston Martin has previously produced two four-door cars—the Lagonda Rapide and the Aston Martin Lagonda. The Lagonda Rapide was introduced in 1961 but production ceased in 1966 after just fifty-five units had been manufactured. The Aston Martin Lagonda was introduced in 1974, and production continued until 1990, by which point 645 units had been produced. The 2010 Rapide is the first series produced four-door vehicle from the company.) The initial design was completed in about seven weeks by Marek Reichman. After more than four months of development, a prototype was completed and displayed at the 2006 North American International Auto Show. The production version of the Rapide debuted at the 2009 International Motor Show Germany, and manufacture began in May 2010 at the Magna Steyr facility in Graz, Austria.

The "vertical/horizontal" (VH) platform, which the Rapide uses, extensively incorporates aluminium throughout the body, reducing weight. In 2012, Aston Martin ended its partnership with Magna Steyr and shifted production to Gaydon, a Warwickshire village where the other VH-platform cars—including the DB9, the DBS, the Vantage and the second-generation Vanquish—were produced. The car was praised by automotive critics for its appealing exterior and interior design. In 2015, Aston Martin debuted an electric concept version, the Rapide E. The production-ready model debuted in 2019 but was never series-produced.

== Development ==
Design work on the Aston Martin Rapide began in 2005 under the guidance of Marek Reichman, whom Aston Martin appointed as lead design director in May. Before assuming his position, Reichman studied the characteristics of Aston Martin's cars and made several sketches for a four-door concept. Ulrich Bez, chief executive officer of Aston Martin, gave the brief to Reichman in the same month as his appointment, and work promptly commenced. Reichman, alongside a team of clay modellers, developed the initial project within seven weeks. Between August and December, a team of twenty-six engineers, led by Reichman and the general manager of prototype operations Ian Calnan, built a full-scale prototype.

After its completion on 22 December 2005, the prototype debuted at the 2006 North American International Auto Show in January. Aston Martin released the first official images of the production version of the Rapide on 26 November 2008 and 16 April 2009. It debuted at the 2009 International Motor Show Germany in September. Official series manufacture of the Rapide began on 7 May 2010 at a facility in Graz, Austria, owned by the automobile manufacturer Magna Steyr.

Aston Martin opted to end its production arrangement with Magna Steyr in the middle of 2012, six years earlier than expected. Production temporarily halted in May 2011. Aston Martin, responding to declining demand for luxury saloons and aligning production with reduced sales, reduced annual output from 2,000 to 1,250 in June 2011. In 2012, Aston Martin relocated production of the Rapide to Gaydon, a village in Warwickshire, after receiving a £1.6 million funding package from the British government's Regional Growth Fund. The funding was part of an agreement between the government and private industry to invest £200 million in the economy. The Rapide was produced in Gaydon until it was discontinued in 2020.

== Design and technology ==
The Rapide's "vertical/horizontal" (VH) platform makes extensive use of aluminium to reduce weight. About sixty per cent of its chassis and powertrain—comprising the engine, transmission and much of the front section up to the windscreen—is carried over from the Aston Martin DB9, which was the first car that used the VH platform. The Rapide's chassis, bodywork and structure are constructed primarily of extruded and cast aluminium, while its roof is made of polycarbonate. The Rapide features Bridgestone Potenza S001 tyres, sized 245/40ZR20 at the front and 295/35ZR20 at the rear. As well as the DB9, the Rapide's platform is also used by the DBS, Vantage, Virage and Vanquish.

The Rapide will be the most elegant four-door sports car in the world [...] It completes the Aston Martin range while conveying our established attributes of power, beauty and soul.

— CEO Ulrich Bez in a press release

The Rapide is considered both a saloon car and a "four-door coupé". Its rear window slopes and narrows towards the back and over the rear haunches to increase its sporty aesthetic. This design compromises rear head and shoulder room, and the rear doors are bulky at waist level. Its rear flanks are wider than those of the DB9, thus smoothing the extended roof design. The rear wings (Note: A "wing" frames the wheel well.) and a curvaceous design language prevent the car from being perceived as a stretched version of the DB9.

The Rapide features a tilt-telescoping steering wheel, bi-xenon headlamps, LED tail-lights, leather and walnut trim with metallic accents, power front seats with memory, and cooling and heating systems. Connectivity features include Bluetooth, satellite radio and compatibility with USB and iPod. Other standard features include a sixteen-speaker Bang & Olufsen sound system with two tweeters that rise from the dashboard on activation of the system. The Rapide became the first Aston Martin model to replace the Volvo-sourced satellite navigation system with a bespoke Garmin unit.

== Powertrains ==
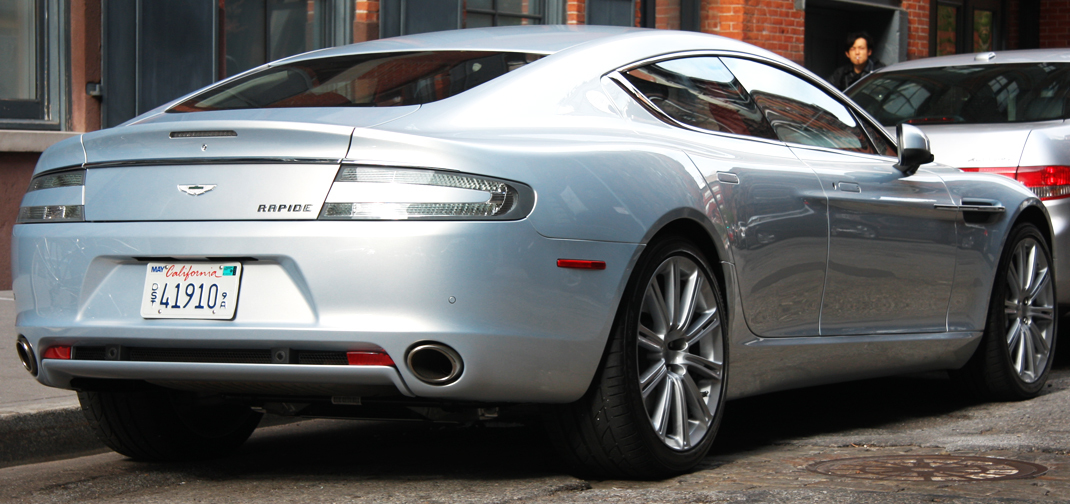
2010 model

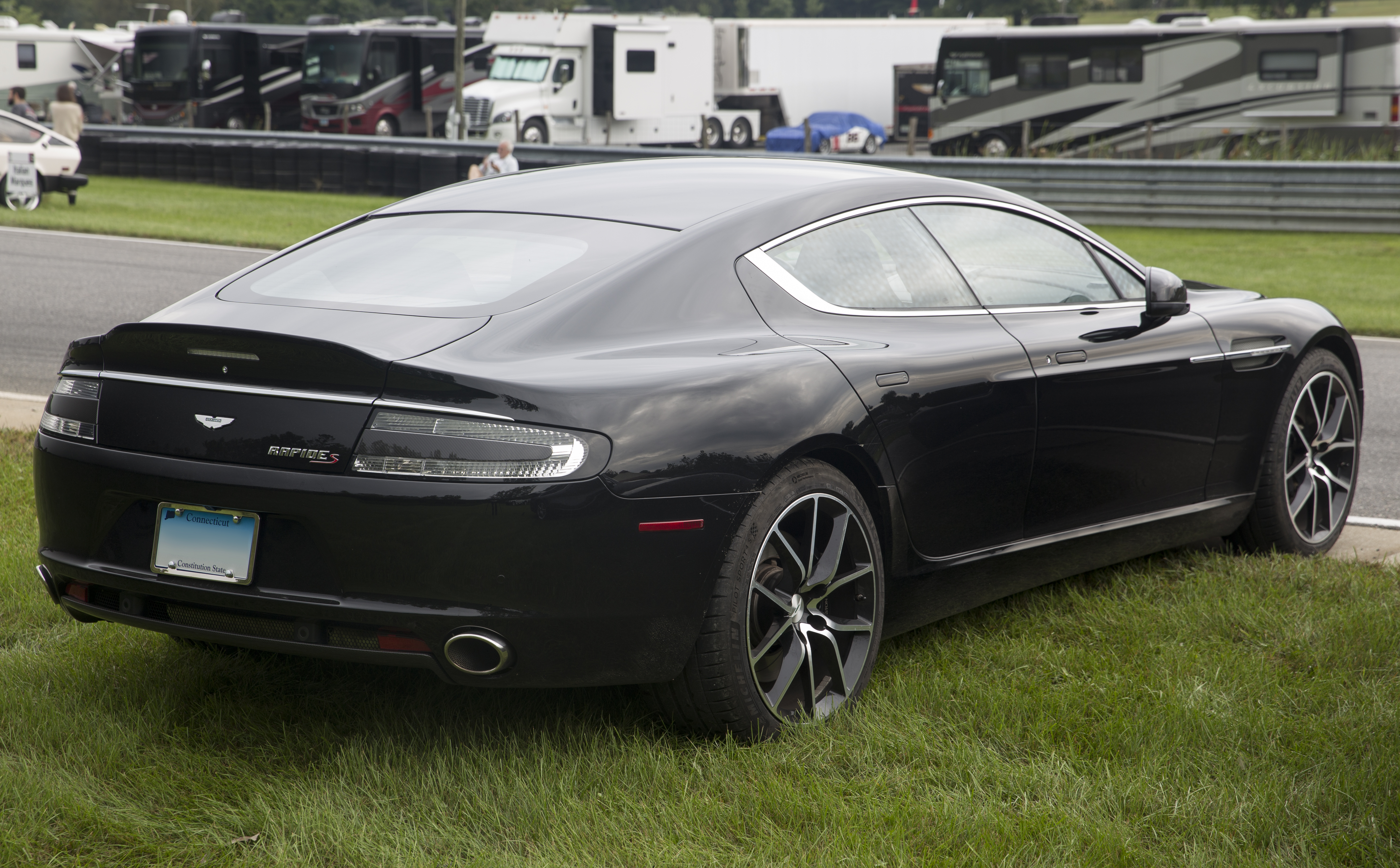
2015 Rapide S

The 5,935 cm^{3} (362 cu in) V12 engine, as fitted to the Rapide, produces 350 kW (470 hp) at 6,000 rpm and 600 N⋅m (443 lb⋅ft) at 5,000 rpm, sufficient to give the car a 0–100 km/h (62 mph) time of 5.1 seconds and a top speed of 303 km/h (188 mph). It features a six-speed Touchtronic II automatic transmission developed by ZF Friedrichshafen, a technology company. Its front-mounted engine powers the rear wheels. Its carbon emissions rating is 355 grams per kilometre (20.2 oz/mi), while its average fuel consumption is about 19 miles per US gallon (12 L/100 km; 23 mpg_{‑imp}), which is considered inefficient.

The "Rapide S" succeeded the Rapide in 2013. The upgraded AM11 V12 engine, as fitted to the Rapide S, produces 410 kW (550 hp) and 620 N⋅m (457 lb⋅ft), sufficient to give the car a 0–100 km/h (62 mph) of 4.9 seconds and a top speed of 306 km/h (190 mph). The car's carbon emissions rating is 332 g/km (18.8 oz/mi). The Rapide S received further revisions in August 2014. These included the AM29 V12 engine, producing 412 kW (552 hp) and 630 N⋅m (465 lb⋅ft), sufficient to give the car a 0–100 km/h (62 mph) of 4.2 seconds and an increased top speed of 327 km/h (203 mph), as well as an eight-speed Touchtronic III automatic transmission.

Aston Martin Rapide engine sound

In June 2018, Aston Martin unveiled the high-performance version of the Rapide named the "Rapide AMR", replacing the Rapide S. The upgraded 5.9-litre engine, as fitted to the Rapide AMR, produces 433 kW (580 hp) and 630 N⋅m (465 lb⋅ft). The car includes standard Michelin Pilot Supersport tyres and 21-inch alloy wheels—the largest wheels fitted to an Aston Martin. The Rapide AMR features a carbon ceramic braking system with six-piston callipers at the front and four-piston callipers at the rear, which incorporate 400 mm (16 in) and 360 mm (14 in) brake rotors at the front and rear, respectively. The Rapide AMR can accelerate from 0–100 km/h (62 mph) in 4.2 seconds and has a top speed of 330 km/h (205 mph). Only 210 units were made.

== Electric conversion ==
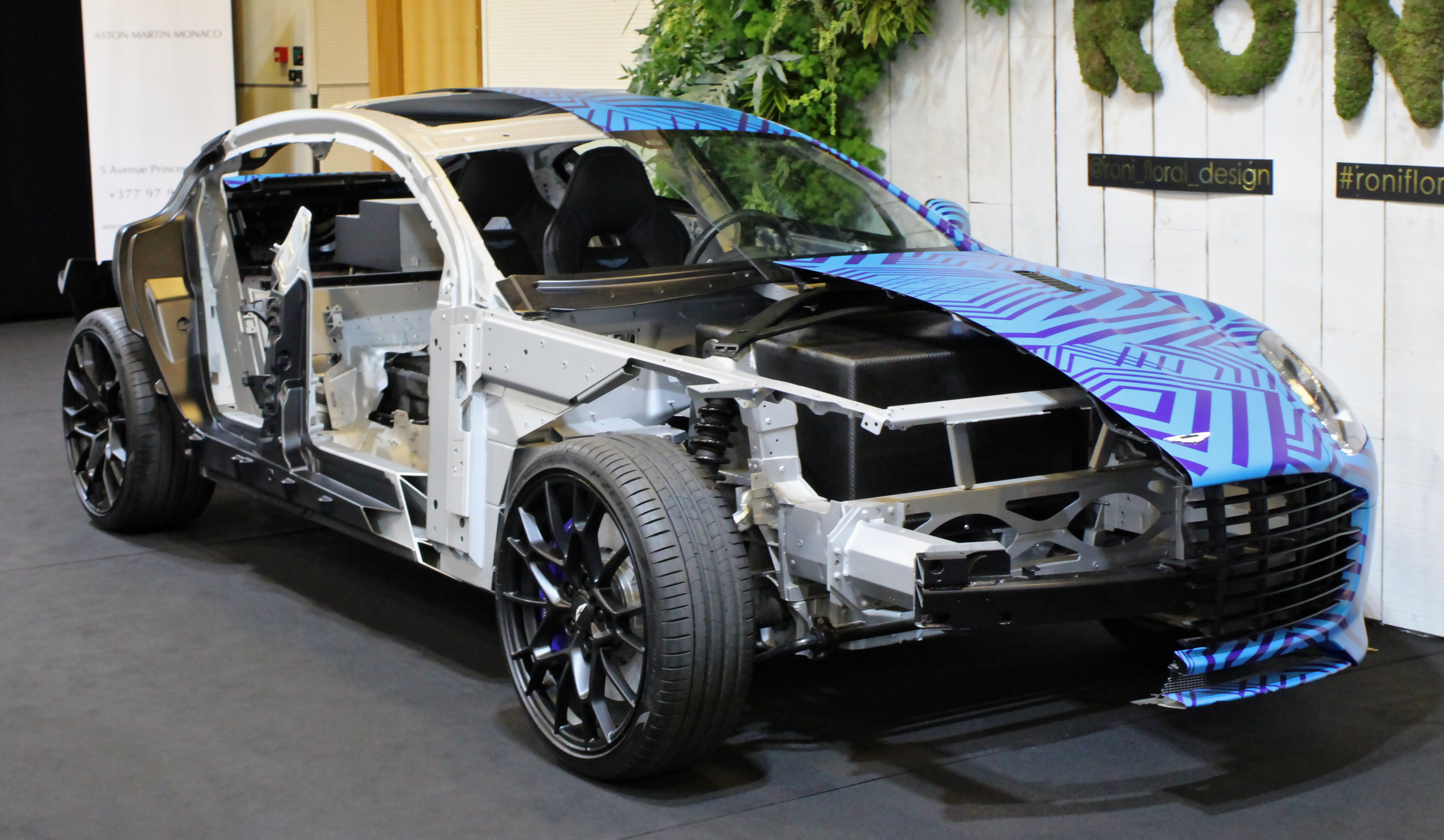
Cutaway of the Aston Martin Rapide E

In October 2015, Aston Martin revealed the concept version of the Rapide E (also known as the RapidE), an electrified version of the Rapide S. At the 2018 International Motor Show, the company confirmed that deliveries of the Rapide E were scheduled for the fourth quarter of 2019. Aston Martin debuted the electric version at the 2019 Shanghai Auto Show. The company intended to manufacture 155 units at its St Athan, Wales, production facility, which would also produce Lagonda's future electric vehicles. Williams Advanced Engineering (WAE) assisted in research and development and supplied the electric system. In January 2020, the Rapide E programme was cancelled because of the reported upcoming introduction of the DBX; the Rapide E was designated as a "research project".

The Rapide E was to have been powered by a 65 kWh (230 MJ) lithium-ion battery provided by HyperBat Limited, a joint venture between WAE and the Unipart manufacturing group, capable of 800-volt power transfers. The battery pack was to house 5,600 lithium-ion electric cells, along with two Integral Powertrain electric motors at the rear, driving the car through an Xtrac transmission with a limited-slip differential. A new suspension system was also planned to accommodate the Rapide E's increased kerb weight. The combined power output of the two electric motors was to be 449 kW (602 hp) with 949 N⋅m (700 lbf⋅ft) of torque. The Rapide E was projected to accelerate from 0–100 km/h (62 mph) in under four seconds with a top speed of 249 km/h (155 mph). Prototypes underwent testing at the Nürburgring to ensure linear power delivery even under strenuous conditions.

The projected all-electric range for the Rapide E was about 322 km (200 mi) according to the standards of the Worldwide Harmonised Light Vehicles Test Procedure, with the ability to charge up to 297 km (185 mi) of range per hour on a 400-volt, 50-kilowatt charger. The Rapide E featured low-drag wheels and low-resistance Pirelli P Zero tyres.

== Reception ==
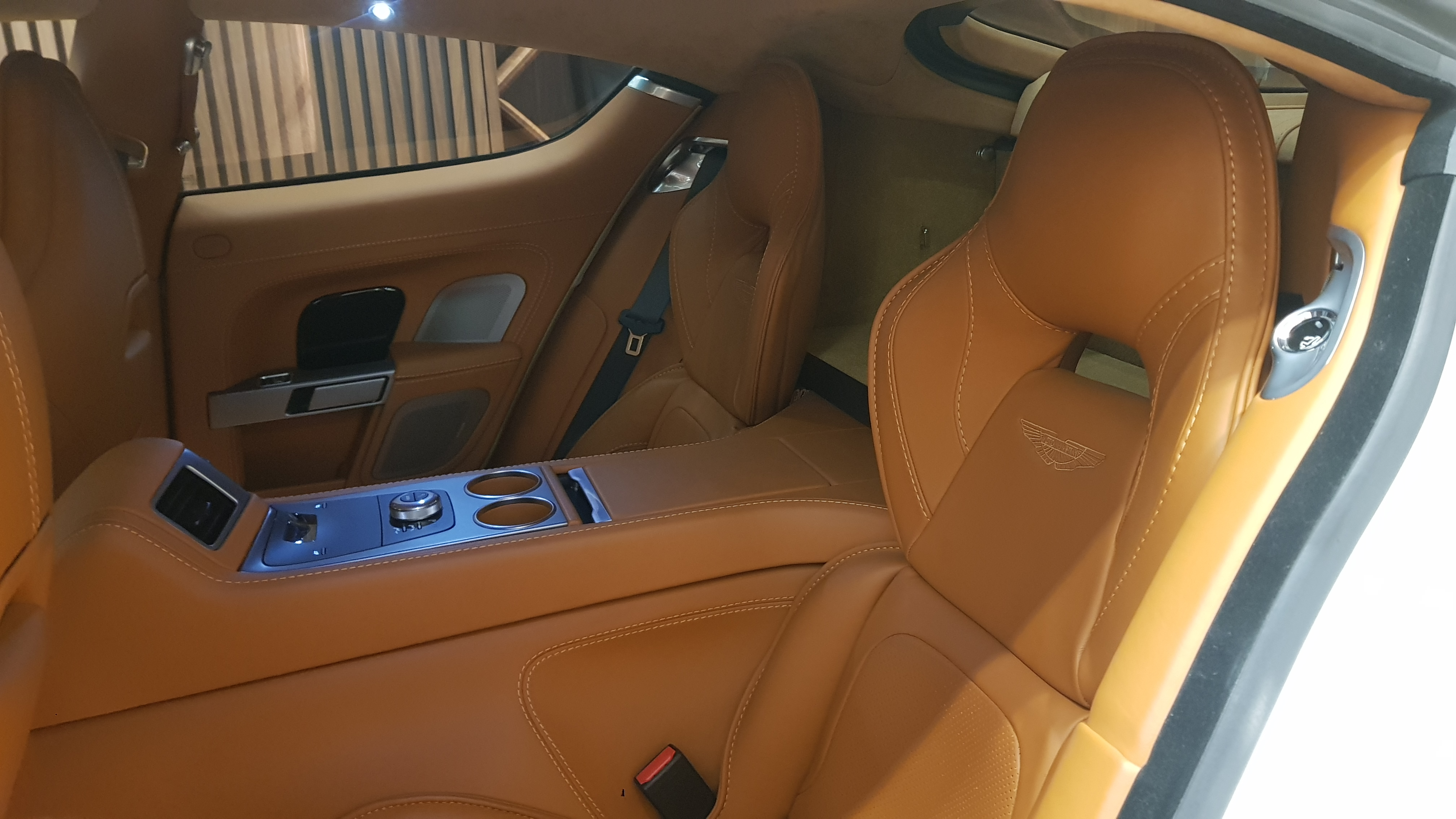
The Rapide was criticised for its tight rear seating.

Reviewers and automotive publishers mostly praised the Rapide's exterior and interior, many describing it as "one of the most beautiful cars" or even the "most beautiful car in the world". A journalist from the newspaper Australian Financial Review described the Rapide as "the prettiest sedan money can buy", and a review from the automotive insurance company RAC Limited contended that the car's design may alone be enough to influence a buyer's decision. They also stated that although its rear cabin was not spacious, the Rapide would transport four "with elegance" as long as occupants were not tall.

The magazine What Car? praised the Rapide's V12 engine, noting that it was one of the largest engines on sale but described the eight-speed transmission as "less impressive". They also highlighted concerns about the car's handling, finding that "the Rapide [was] unsettled by ruts and bumps at all speeds, while [the] firmer Sport mode simply makes things even more uncomfortable". They also pointed out that the car's large dimensions affected its handling, stating that "despite having nicely precise steering, the Rapide does not feel particularly agile". They complained that its large wheels generated road noise, although wind noise was effectively suppressed.

== Motorsport ==
A Rapide was entered in the 2010 24 Hours of Nürburgring. It finished second in the SP 8 class and thirty-fourth overall. A Rapide S was entered in the 2013 edition; powered by a new technology introduced by Alset GmbH, its hybrid–hydrogen system enables the car to use hydrogen and petrol individually or simultaneously in its internal combustion engine. This Rapide S was the first car to race the 24 Hours of Nürburgring with hydrogen fuel.

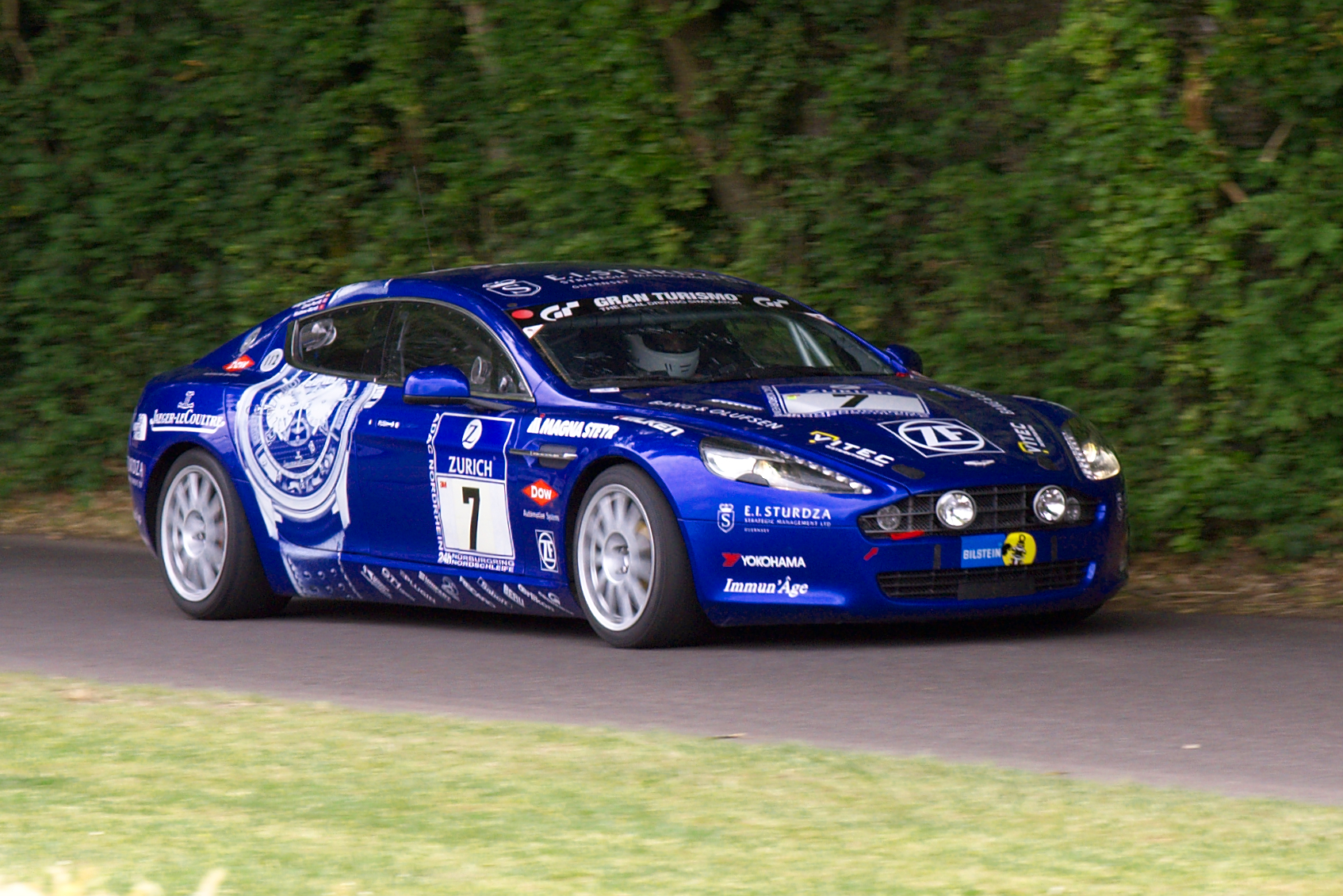
The car that ran at the 2010 24 Hours of Nürburgring

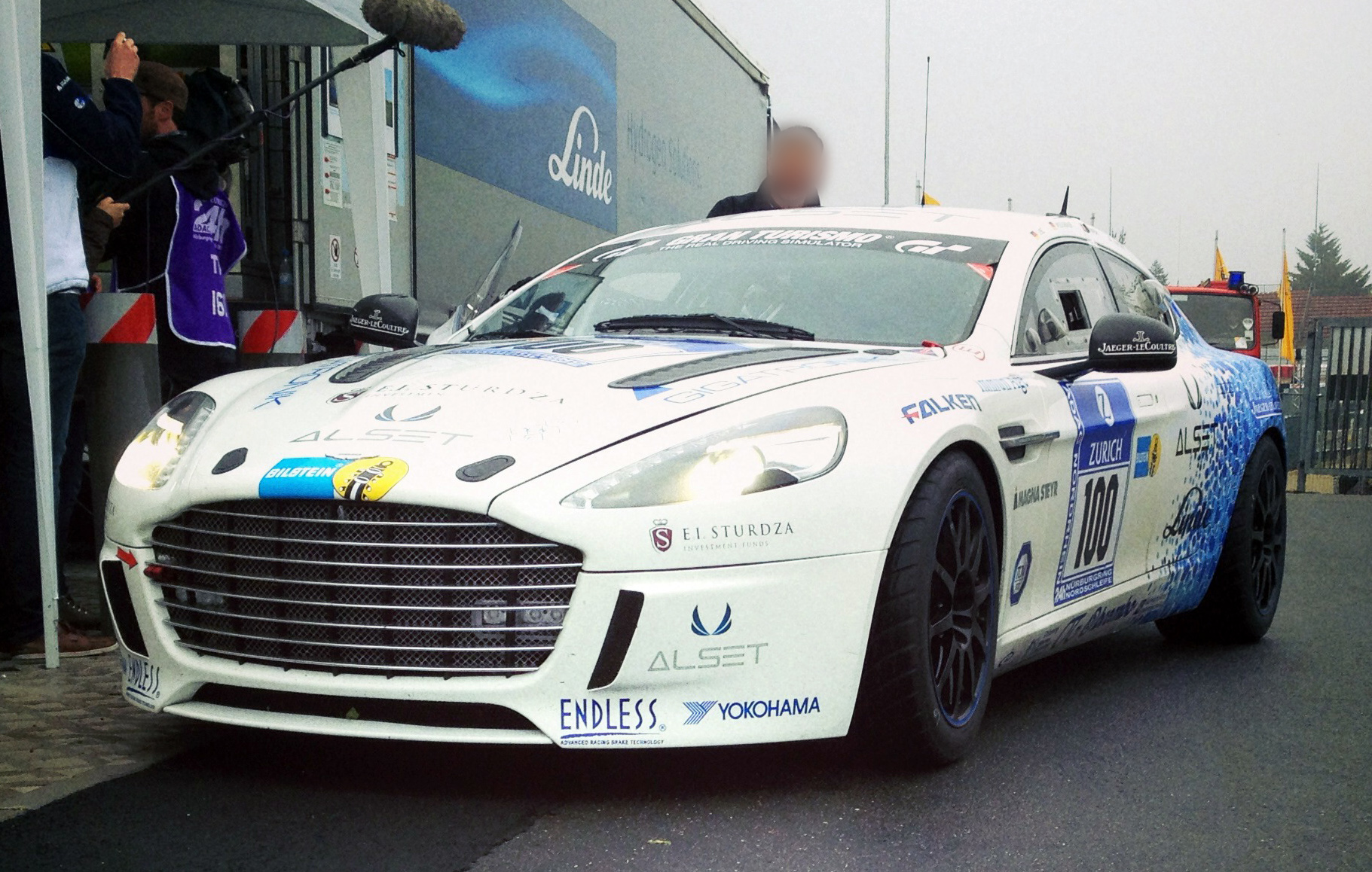
The car with the hybrid hydrogen system that ran at the 2013 24 Hours of Nürburgring
