= VH =

VH or Vh may refer to:

== Transportation ==
- VH, Australian aircraft registration prefix
- VH, a series of the Chrysler Valiant automobile
- Aston Martin VH platform, a sports car automobile platform
- Holden Commodore (VH), an automobile introduced by Holden in 1981
- Nissan VH engine, built by Nissan Motor Corporation from 1989 to 2001
- Viva Air Colombia (former IATA code: VH), a former airline

== Other uses ==
- V H Group, an Indian diversified company
- Van Halen, an American hard rock band
