= Aston Martin DB10 =

Aston Martin vehicle for James Bond film

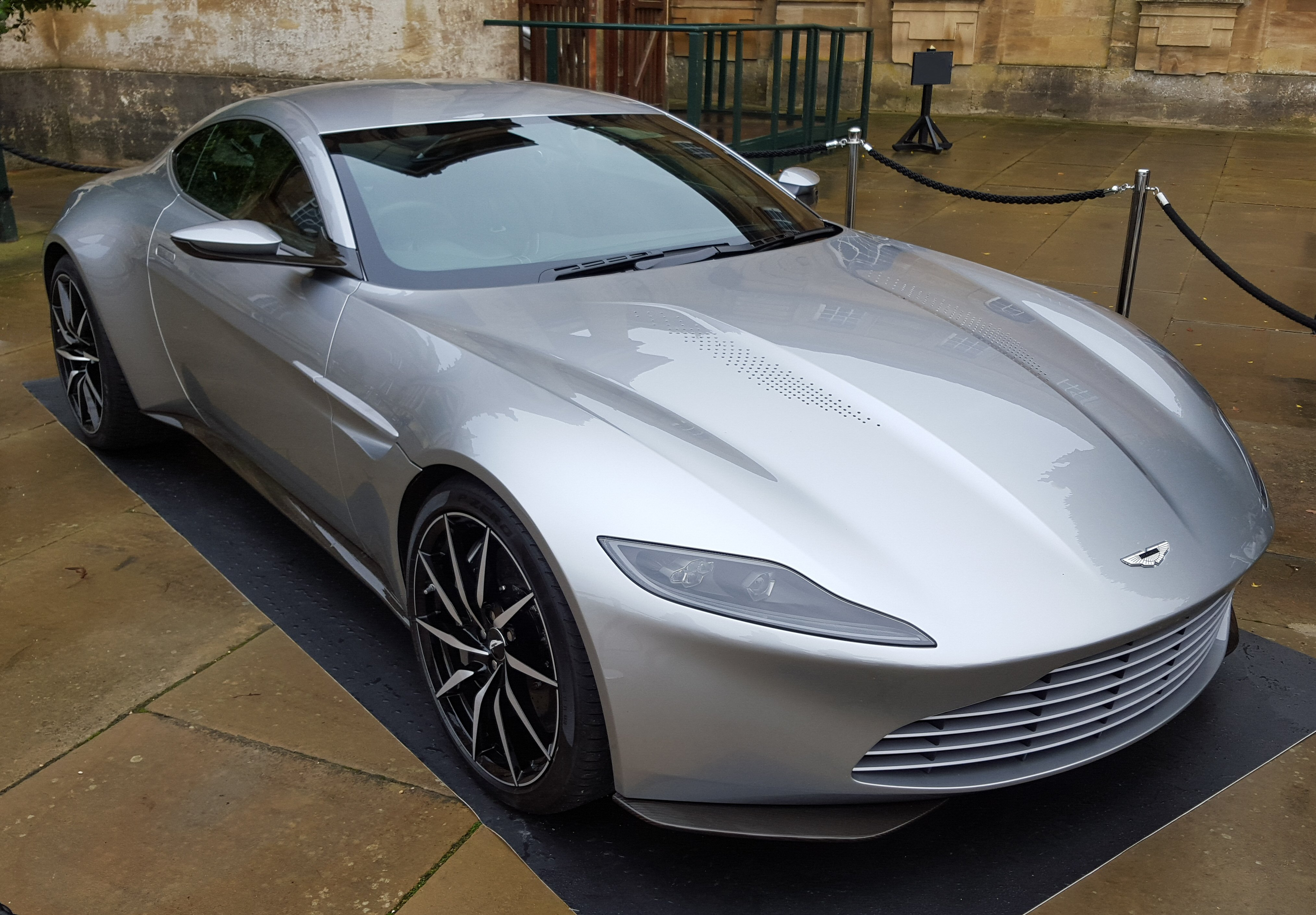

Overview
- Manufacturer: Aston Martin Lagonda Limited
- Production: 2014–2015; 10 produced
- Assembly: United Kingdom: Gaydon, Warwickshire
- Designer: Sam Holgate under Marek Reichman

Body and chassis
- Class: Grand Tourer (S)
- Body style: 2-door coupé
- Layout: Front mid-engine, rear-wheel-drive
- Platform: VH Generation II (Modified)
- Doors: Swan
- Related: Aston Martin Vantage (2005); Aston Martin Vantage (2018)

Powertrain
- Engine: 4.7 L AM14 V8
- Transmission: 6-speed Graziano manual

Dimensions
- Wheelbase: 2,705 mm (106 in)
- Width: 2,204 mm (87 in)
- Kerb weight: 1,542 kg (3,400 lb)

The Aston Martin DB10 is a bespoke grand tourer specially developed for the James Bond film Spectre by the British luxury car manufacturer Aston Martin.

== Development ==
The car was unveiled by Sam Mendes and Barbara Broccoli, the director and producer of Spectre respectively, the 24th James Bond film produced by Eon Productions. The unveiling took place as part of the official press launch of the film on the 007 Stage at Pinewood Studios, near London, on 4 December 2014. Mendes introduced the car as "the first cast member."

Shortly after the unveiling ceremony in Pinewood Studios, Aston Martin also took part in the launch of the Bond in Motion exhibition at the London Film Museum in Covent Garden, London. The car manufacturer celebrated their fifty-year partnership with Bond films franchise, which started with the DB5 being used in the 1964 film Goldfinger.

=== Design, concept and production ===
The design of the DB10 was led by Aston Martin's chief creative officer Marek Reichman, with the film's director Mendes working closely with the team. Original concept and sketch by Sam Holgate, a 30-year-old man from Foston whose design the DB10 was based upon. Only 10 units were hand-built in-house by the company's design and engineering teams in Gaydon. Eight of those 10 cars were featured in the movie, and two more were built for promotional purposes. Aston Martin stated that "the DB10 gives a glimpse to the future design direction for the next generation of Aston Martins." It was later revealed that the DB10 was based on the newly introduced V8 Vantage that made its debut in 2017 and had a modified design so that the design of the new Vantage didn't come to public notice while the car was in development.

=== Technical specifications ===
As of December 2014, Aston Martin had released few of the technical details of the car, the DB10 used the company's 6-speed manual transmission unit that is used on their V8-engined cars. The car's chassis is based on a modified version of the VH Generation II platform that underpins the V8 Vantage. However the DB10 has a longer wheelbase and is nearly as wide as the One-77. It is powered by the same 4.7-litre AM14 V8 engine found in the V8 Vantage S, which has a power output of 436 PS (321 kW; 430 hp) and 490 N⋅m (361 lb⋅ft) of torque. The DB10 can accelerate from 0 to 100 km/h (62 mph) in 4.3 seconds and has a top speed of 310 km/h (193 mph).

== In the film ==
In the film's plot, it was originally going to be for James Bond but was reassigned to 009 due to the former's unsanctioned mission in Mexico. However, Bond later steals the car in order to travel to Rome to investigate SPECTRE. The car is later destroyed during a chase with Mr. Hinx when Bond decides to sink it into the river. The car is equipped with a rear machine gun on its back which isn't loaded with ammo, flamethrowers that are mostly in the car's exhaust, an ejector seat, as well as a music playlist intended for 009 to listen to much to Bond's annoyance.

== After the film ==
On 19 February 2016, one of the two "show cars" was sold at an auction for £2.4 million.

In 2018, after the wedding reception of Princess Eugenie and Jack Brooksbank, the couple used a DB10 with the DB10 AGB number plate to leave the event.

== Promotional items ==
In 2015, diecast car maker Corgi produced 1/36 scale models of the DB10 and offered a limited package with both the DB10 and the DB5. Hot Wheels produced 1/64 scale cars in both their basic line and premium Retro Entertainment line. A detailed 1/18 scale model were also produced as a part of their Cult Classics line.

Scalextric released the C1336 - Spectre set which included the DB10 and Jaguar C-X75.

== See also ==
- List of James Bond vehicles

== Gallery ==
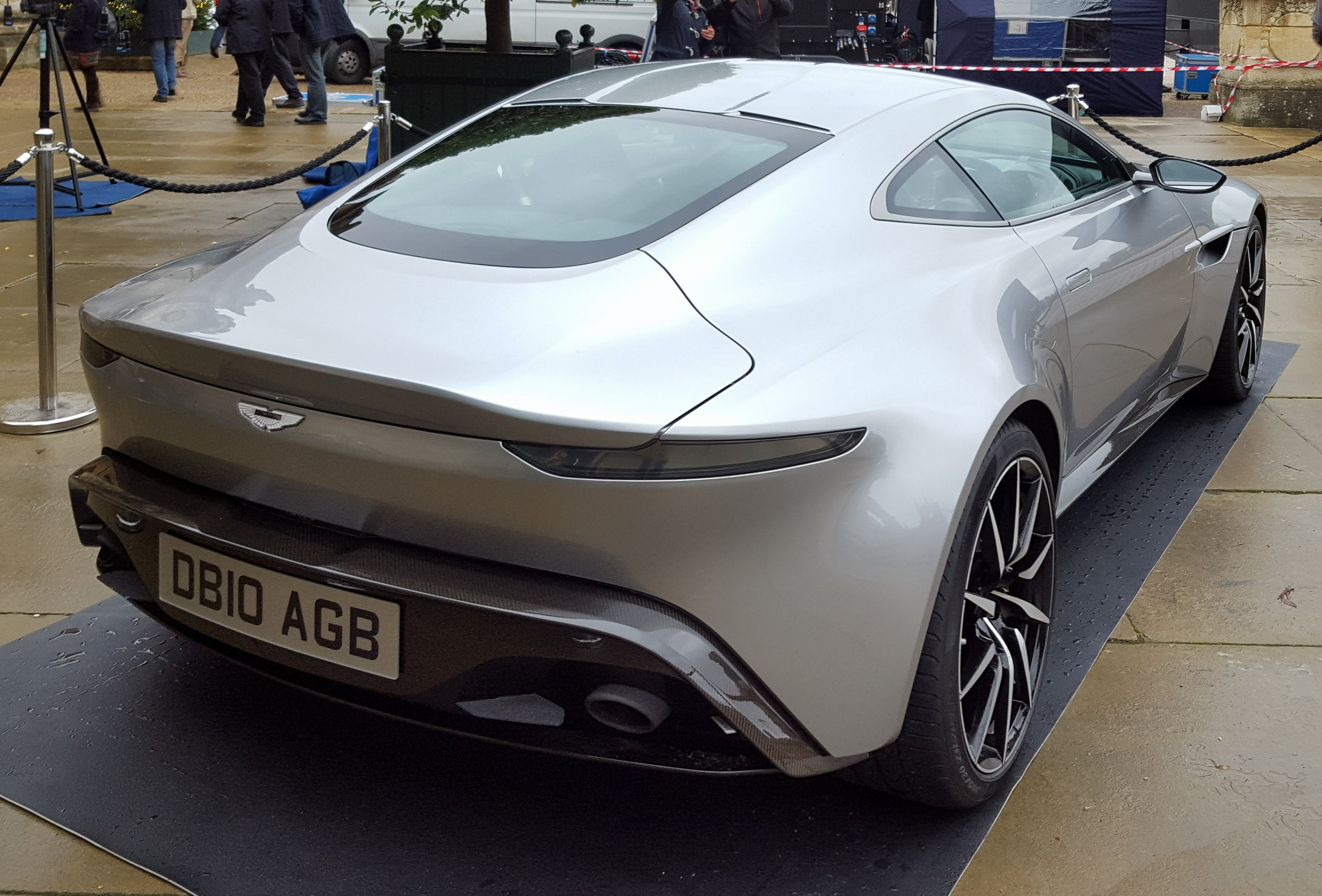
Rear view

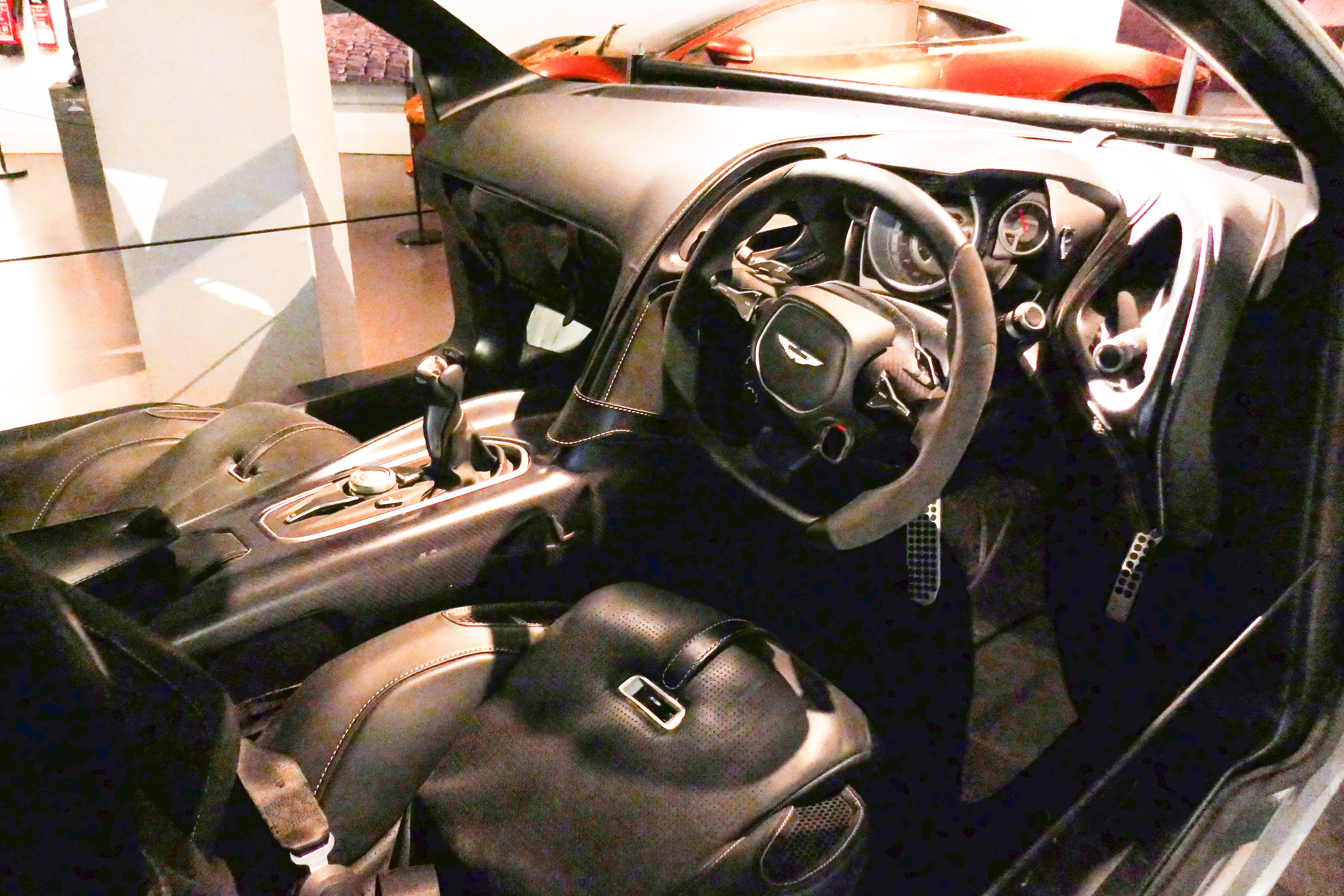
Interior

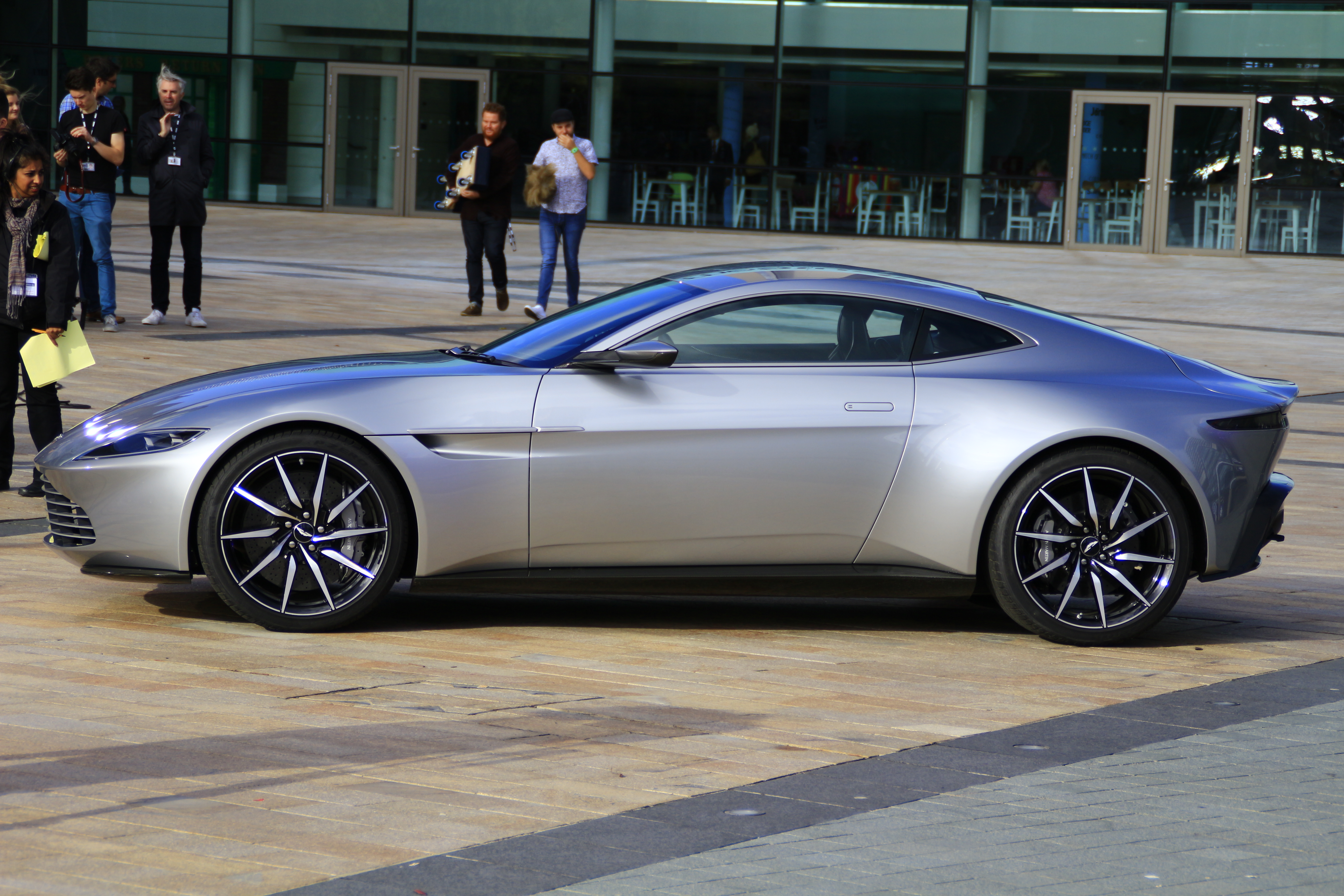
Side profile

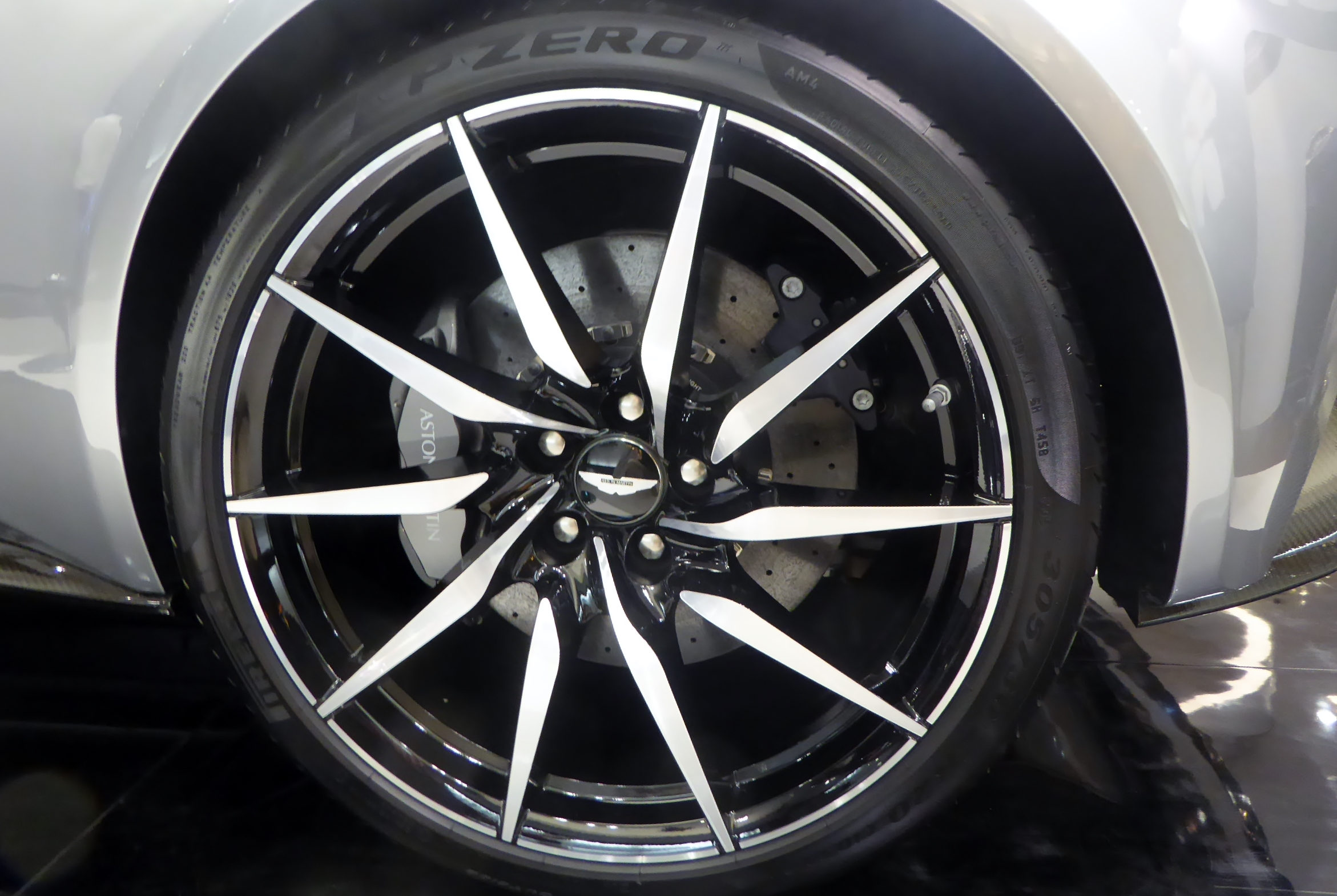
Bespoke wheel

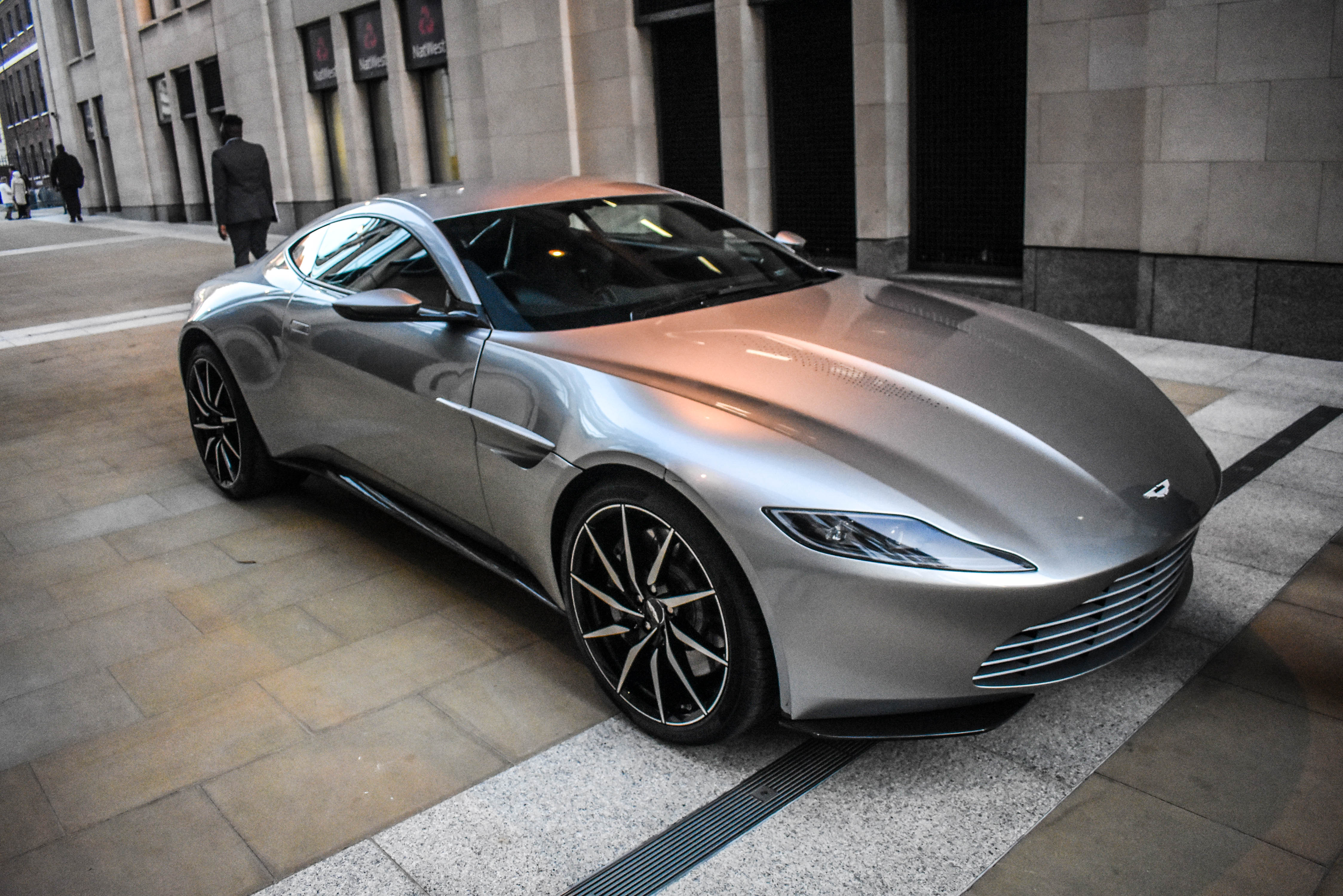
Front view
