= Aston Martin VH platform =

Aston Martin's automobile platform

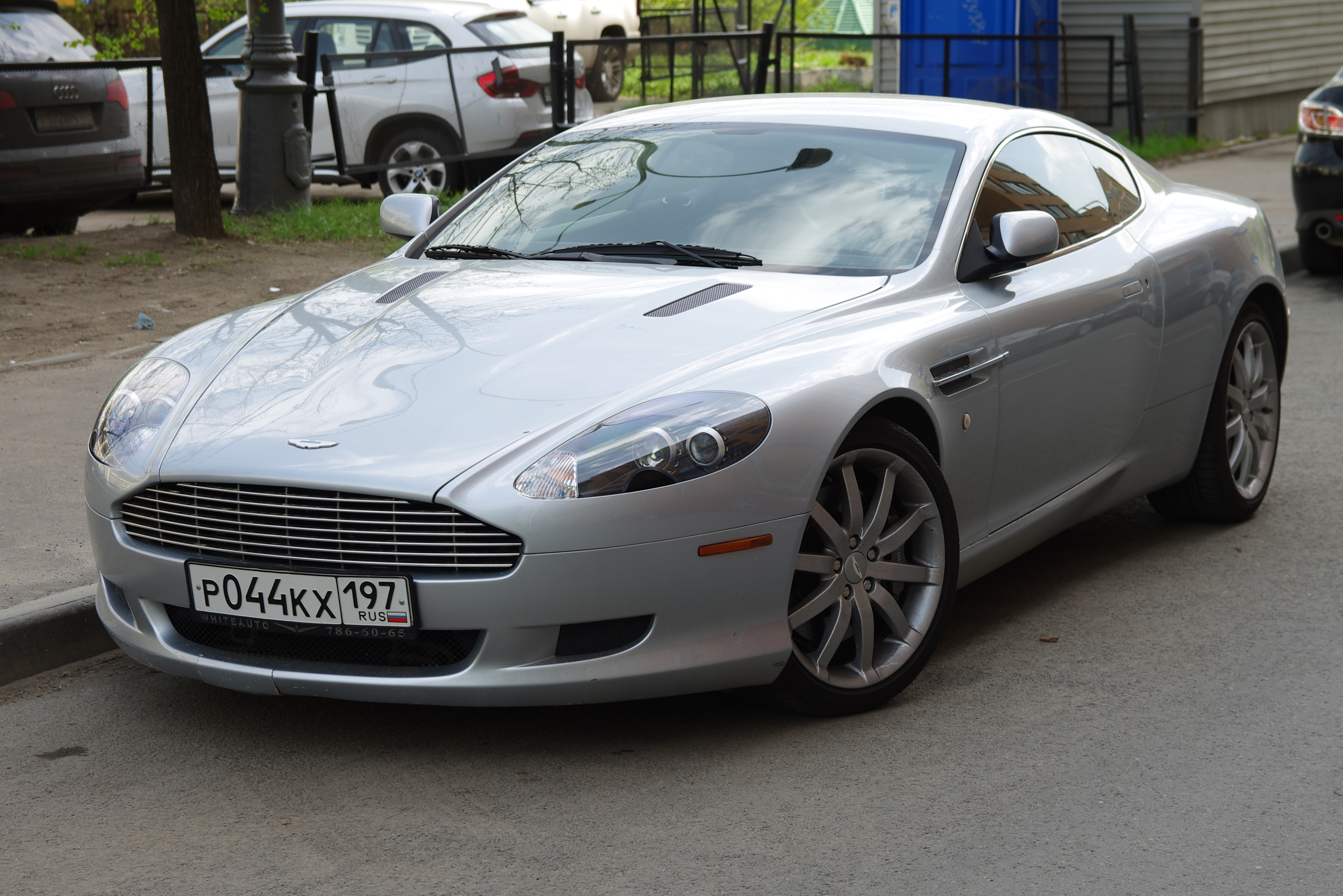
The DB9 was the first car to use the VH platform.

The British carmaker Aston Martin developed the vertical–horizontal (VH) vehicle platform to serve as the basis of most of the mass-produced vehicles in its lineup manufactured between 2004 and 2016, comprising the DB9, Vantage, DBS, Rapide and Vanquish. The limited-production Virage, DB10 and Lagonda Taraf also used this platform.

Ulrich Bez was appointed chief executive officer and chairman of Aston Martin in July 2000. At that time, the company had made significant investments in the V12 Vanquish's structural platform and determined that developing a separate platform for a single model would not be a prudent use of resources. In 2001, Bez initiated the development of a new versatile architecture intended to accompany automobiles of various sizes; most of the developments were done within that year. Aston Martin implemented modifications to enhance assembly efficiency, aiming for thirty minutes per unit, compared to the four hours required for the V12 Vanquish. The VH platform was developed to be flexible. Every vehicle that uses it incorporates bonded and riveted aluminium to reduce weight. The term "vertical" indicates that the platform can accommodate various applications and can be adjusted in size to meet the requirements of future models. The term "horizontal" signifies that components of the platform can be used across different models within the Aston Martin lineup.

The first vehicle to use the VH platform was the DB9, which constituted the platform's first generation. The Vantage, introduced in 2005, used the second generation of the platform, along with the DBS and DB10, introduced in 2007 and 2014, respectively. The third generation of the platform was used by the Virage in 2011, the 2012 facelift of the DB9 and the 2012 Vanquish. The Rapide and Lagonda Taraf used the fourth generation, an extended version of the platform. The cars have since been discontinued. The Virage and DBS both ended production in 2012, followed by the DB10 in 2015. The DB9 and Taraf were discontinued in 2016, while the Vantage and Vanquish ended production in 2018. Production of the Rapide ended in 2020.

== Vehicles ==
Mass produced vehicles
Body style	Model					Refs.
Body style	Name	Image	Introduction (year)	Discontinuation (year)	Generation	Refs.
Grand tourer	DB9	Front three-quarters view of a silver coupe	2004	2016	I (2004–2012); III (2012–2016)	
Sports car	Vantage	Front three-quarters view of a brown coupe	2005	2018	II	
Grand tourer	DBS	Front three-quarters view of a silver coupe	2007	2012	II	
Executive car	Rapide	Front three-quarters view of a silver saloon	2010	2020	IV	
Grand tourer	Vanquish	Front three-quarters view of a dark gray coupe	2012	2018	III	

Limited-production vehicles
Body style	Model					Refs.
Body style	Name	Image	Introduction (year)	Discontinuation (year)	Generation	Refs.
Grand tourer	Virage	Front three-quarters view of a silver coupe	2011	2012	III	
Grand tourer	DB10	Front three-quarters view of a silver coupe	2014	2015	II	
Full-size luxury car	Lagonda Taraf	Front three-quarters view of a gold saloon on a race track	2015	2016	IV	
