= Lewis Kingston =

British motoring journalist (born 1986)

- Born: 1986 (age 39–40); England
- Education: Coventry University
- Occupation: Motoring journalist
- Years active: Since 2010
- Employer: Freelance

Lewis Kingston is an active British motoring journalist who has written for several magazines and websites, primarily in Britain. He is currently freelance and writes for PistonHeads, Modern Classics, Honest John and other outlets.

Prior to going freelance, Kingston was editor of the automotive social media website DriveTribe, following a promotion from associate editor. He moved to DriveTribe from UK-based title Car (magazine), which is owned by the Bauer Media Group, where he was online editor in 2016.

Before joining Car, Kingston held the position of senior reviewer at the UK-based titles Autocar and What Car?, both operated by the privately owned Haymarket Media Group, where he primarily wrote new car reviews and group tests. He joined the company in February 2013, as deputy digital editor of Autocar, and left for Car (magazine) in January 2016.

Other earlier roles include working as a consumer journalist at Parker's Car Guides, another Bauer Media Group title, writing reviews, news and features. He has also contributed to other titles and has made many TV appearances and radio broadcasts to discuss motoring-related subjects.

Notable articles written by Kingston include an attempt to hit 150 mph in a £500 Jaguar, coverage of the reveal of the Keating 'The Bolt' supercar and a test of the Tesla Motors supercharger network in Europe.

In February 2015, during magazine-related performance testing at Millbrook Proving Grounds, he twice experienced complete brake failure in the new Suzuki Celerio. All activities involving the car, which was due on sale the following weekend, were suspended as a result of the failures until the problem could be identified. Both Autocar and What Car? ran updates, and later a feature, on the incident. Suzuki invited Kingston back to Millbrook in order to test cars fitted with the redesigned braking component, which proved to be trouble-free.

During his first year at Autocar, Kingston won the headlineauto "Young Writer of the Year award" in the 2013 Guild of Motoring Writers Awards. Kingston also came second in the "Rising Star of the Year (Consumer)" category in the Guild of Motoring Awards 2011, following his first several months in the industry.

In December 2015, while at Autocar and What Car?, Kingston repeated his earlier success and won the Newspress "Young Writer of the Year award" at the Guild of Motoring Writers Awards. His report on the Suzuki Celerio additionally earned him a nomination for "Scoop of the Year" in the British Society of Magazine Editors awards.

At the 2017 Newspress awards, Kingston was awarded "Road Tester of the year," based on his submitted magazine road tests of the Cadillac CT6, Volkswagen Beetle Dune and Subaru XV. He repeated this success in 2018, again being awarded "Road Tester of the year" by Newspress.

Kingston has an interest in engineering and studied motorsport engineering at Coventry University. He has owned numerous classic cars, many of which he has carried out restorations and upgrades on. Previous projects include the recommissioning of a 1968 Dodge Charger, which he purchased in February 2015. It replaced a 1988 Lancia Delta Integrale, which appeared briefly in Autocar magazine as a long-term test car. He currently owns a Subaru Forester, a Jaguar Cars XJR and a Mk4 Toyota Supra.
