= Gaydon =

Village and civil parish in Warwickshire, England

Coordinates: 52°11′01″N 1°28′12″W

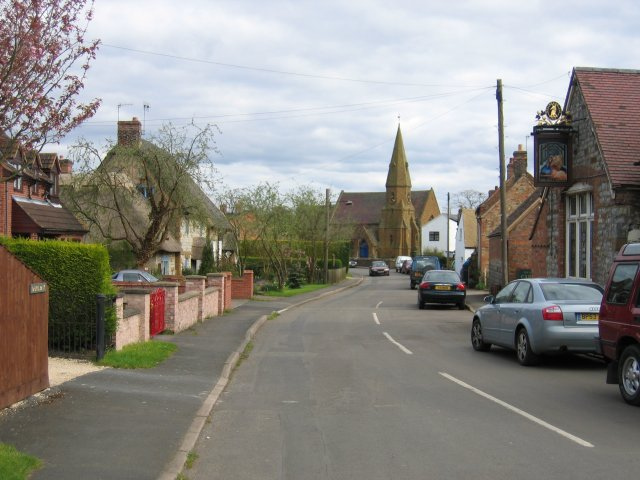
- Gaydon

- Location within Warwickshire
- Population: 530 (2021 census)
- OS grid reference: SP370540
- District: Stratford-on-Avon
- Shire county: Warwickshire
- Region: West Midlands
- Country: England
- Sovereign state: United Kingdom
- Post town: WARWICK
- Postcode district: CV35
- Dialling code: 01926
- Police: Warwickshire
- Fire: Warwickshire
- Ambulance: West Midlands
- UK Parliament: Stratford-On-Avon

Gaydon is a civil parish and village in the Stratford-on-Avon District of Warwickshire, England, situated between Leamington Spa and Banbury. In the 2001 census, the parish had a population of 376, increasing to 446 at the 2011 census and 530 residents at the 2021 census.

The village is at the junction of the B4100 (former A41) and B4451 roads, within a mile from Junction 12 of the M40 motorway and midway between the larger villages of Kineton, 3 miles to the south-west, and Bishop's Itchington 3 miles to the north-east. The county border with Oxfordshire is 5.5 miles to the south-east and the Northamptonshire boundary lies 6.5 miles to the east of the village.

== Gaydon village ==
Gaydon is crossed by only two roads of any importance – the Kineton to Southam road, which runs in a north-easterly direction, and the Warwick and Banbury road which crosses it at right angles. Gaydon has one pub called the Malt Shovel. The Gaydon Inn, which is no longer a pub and is due to be redeveloped for housing, stands close to the point of intersection of the two roads. The village centre is situated along a short loop south of the junction. The Gaydon Inn was famous in the 18th century for its association with violent highwaymen.

The Malt Shovel pub, together with the adjacent community shop, is located off Church Road and is now the only commercial enterprise in the village.

The Manor House on Kineton Road dates back to the 17th century.

Although Gaydon has become something of a commuter village because of its proximity to the M40, which was completed in January 1991, it is undergoing a revival by looking back at its roots, agriculture and community spirit. A village shop opened in May 2010 in the centre of the village.

The section of the M40 passing Gaydon was considered as the site of a possible motorway service station, with plans first being drawn up in 1986 before being scrapped in 1990, a few months before the motorway's completion.

== Motor industry ==
Close by, on the site of former RAF V bomber base of RAF Gaydon, is the Jaguar Land Rover Gaydon Centre, one of the Jaguar Land Rover engineering centres (another being at the Whitley plant in Coventry). Alongside is the British Motor Museum, home to the largest collection of historic British cars in the world, charting the history of the British car industry from the turn of the 20th century to the present day. Adjacent to the north of the JLR site is the headquarters and main production plant of Aston Martin (actually closer to Lighthorne Heath village) and the village fire station. Famous James Bond cars including the DBS V12 and the Aston Martin DB10 were built here.

== Transport ==
Buses are run by Stagecoach Midlands. Services run towards Leamington Spa, Banbury and Stratford.

== Film archive ==
A disused military base near Gaydon is also home to special vaults housing the highly flammable nitrate film elements of the British Film Institute's BFI National Archive, the world's largest archive of film and television.

== Nearby places ==
- Lighthorne
- Kineton
- Fenny Compton
- Northend, Warwickshire
- Bishop's Itchington
- Chadshunt
- Temple Herdewyke
- Radway
