= Aston Martin DB9 =

Grand touring coupé and convertible

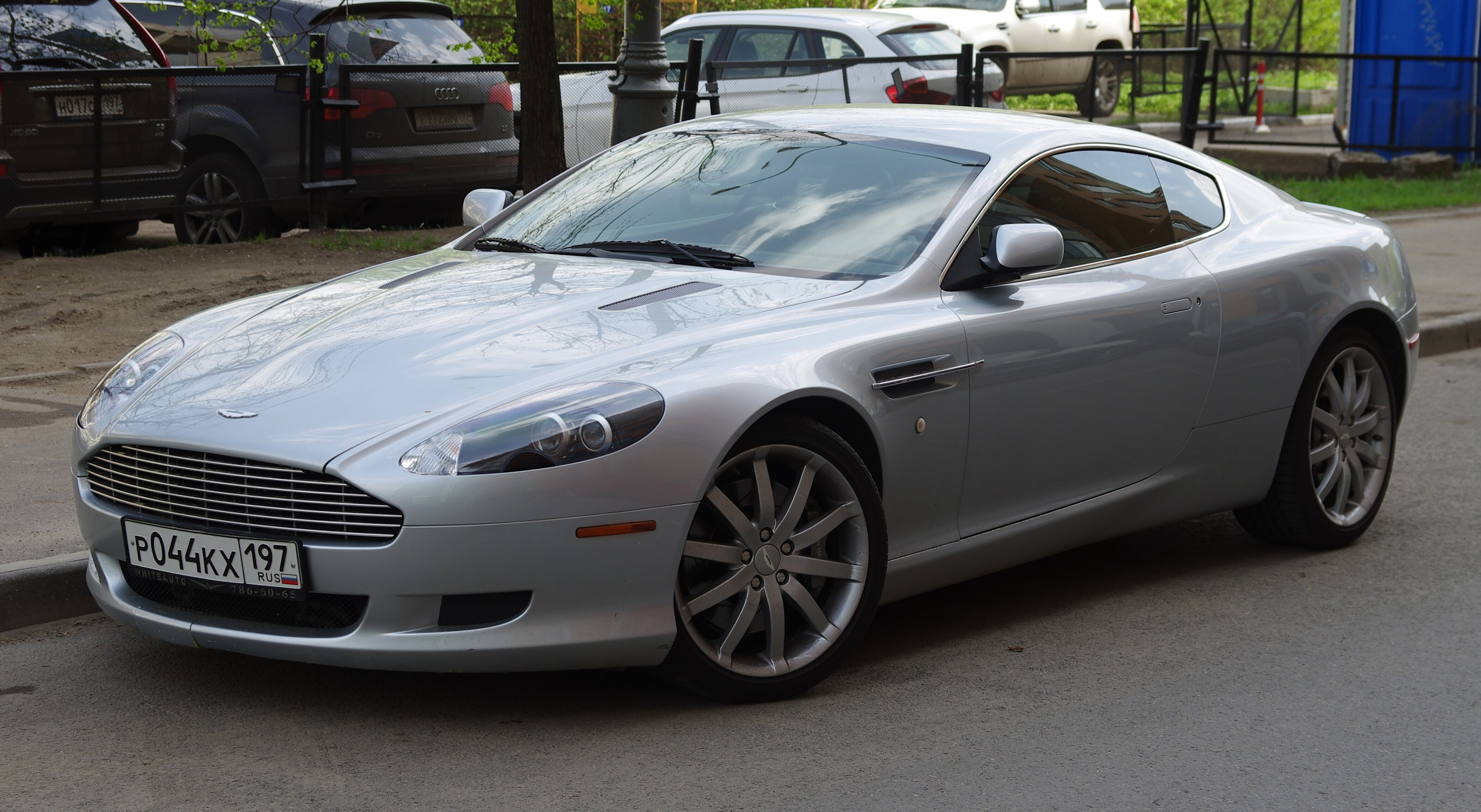
- 2005 Aston Martin DB9

Overview
- Manufacturer: Aston Martin
- Model code: AM802
- Production: January 2004 – July 2016
- Assembly: United Kingdom: Gaydon, Warwickshire
- Designer: Ian Callum and Henrik Fisker (2001; initial design); Marek Reichman (facelifts) (Note: This includes the 2010 and 2013 facelifts.)

Body and chassis
- Class: Grand tourer
- Body style: 2+2 2-door coupé; 2+2 2-door convertible
- Layout: Front mid-engine, rear-wheel-drive
- Platform: Aston Martin VH
- Doors: Swan-wing
- Related: Aston Martin DBS; Aston Martin Rapide; Aston Martin Vantage; Aston Martin Virage; Aston Martin Vanquish; Lagonda Taraf

Powertrain
- Engine: 5.9 L Aston Martin V12
- Transmission: 6-speed ZF 6HP 26 (Touchtronic) automatic; 6-speed Graziano manual

Dimensions
- Wheelbase: 2,740–2,745 mm (107.9–108.1 in)
- Length: 4,697–4,720 mm (184.9–185.8 in)
- Width: 2,017–2,061 mm (79.4–81.1 in) (Note: Including the side-view mirrors)
- Height: 1,270–1,282 mm (50.0–50.5 in)
- Kerb weight: 1,710–1,785 kg (3,770–3,935 lb)

Chronology
- Predecessor: Aston Martin DB7
- Successor: Aston Martin DB11

The Aston Martin DB9 is a two-door grand tourer car that was produced by the British carmaker Aston Martin in Gaydon, Warwickshire. It was manufactured both as a coupé starting in 2004 and a convertible known as the Volante from 2005, until their discontinuation in 2016.

Ian Callum and Henrik Fisker designed the DB9, which succeeded the DB7 and debuted at the Frankfurt Motor Show in 2003; the Volante debuted at the Detroit Auto Show in 2004. Built upon Aston Martin's vertical/horizontal platform, the car employs extensive use of lightweight materials—including aluminium and composite materials—throughout the body. Aston Martin implemented a series of updates to the car over its production, the first two (in 2008 and 2010) involving minor changes to elements like the headlights, tail-lights, engine and interior. A 2012 update brought about a completely restyled front fascia, with largely redesigned headlights that gave the DB9 a design reminiscent of the 2011–2012 Virage.

The company's racing division, Aston Martin Racing, adapted the DB9 for sports car racing in the form of the DBR9 and the DBRS9 for the FIA GT1 and the FIA GT3, respectively. They were extensively modified; the interior features were removed and the aluminium body panels were replaced by carbon fibre panels. The engine was modified in both cars to produce more horsepower and torque. Aston Martin released multiple special editions of the DB9, notably the DB9 LM, the DB9 Zagato Spyder Centennial and the DB9 GT. While the car's design was widely praised and considered better than its competitors, reviewers criticized its handling and limited cargo capacity, in which they felt its peers outperformed it.

== Name ==
The letters "DB" are the initials of David Brown, the owner of Aston Martin between 1947 and 1972. Although the DB9 succeeded the DB7, Aston Martin did not name the car DB8 due to fears that the name would suggest that it featured a V8 engine—the DB9 has a V12. Reports indicated that Aston Martin held the belief that naming the car "DB8" would suggest a progressive evolution, given that the DB9 marked the introduction of an entirely new vehicle.

== Background ==
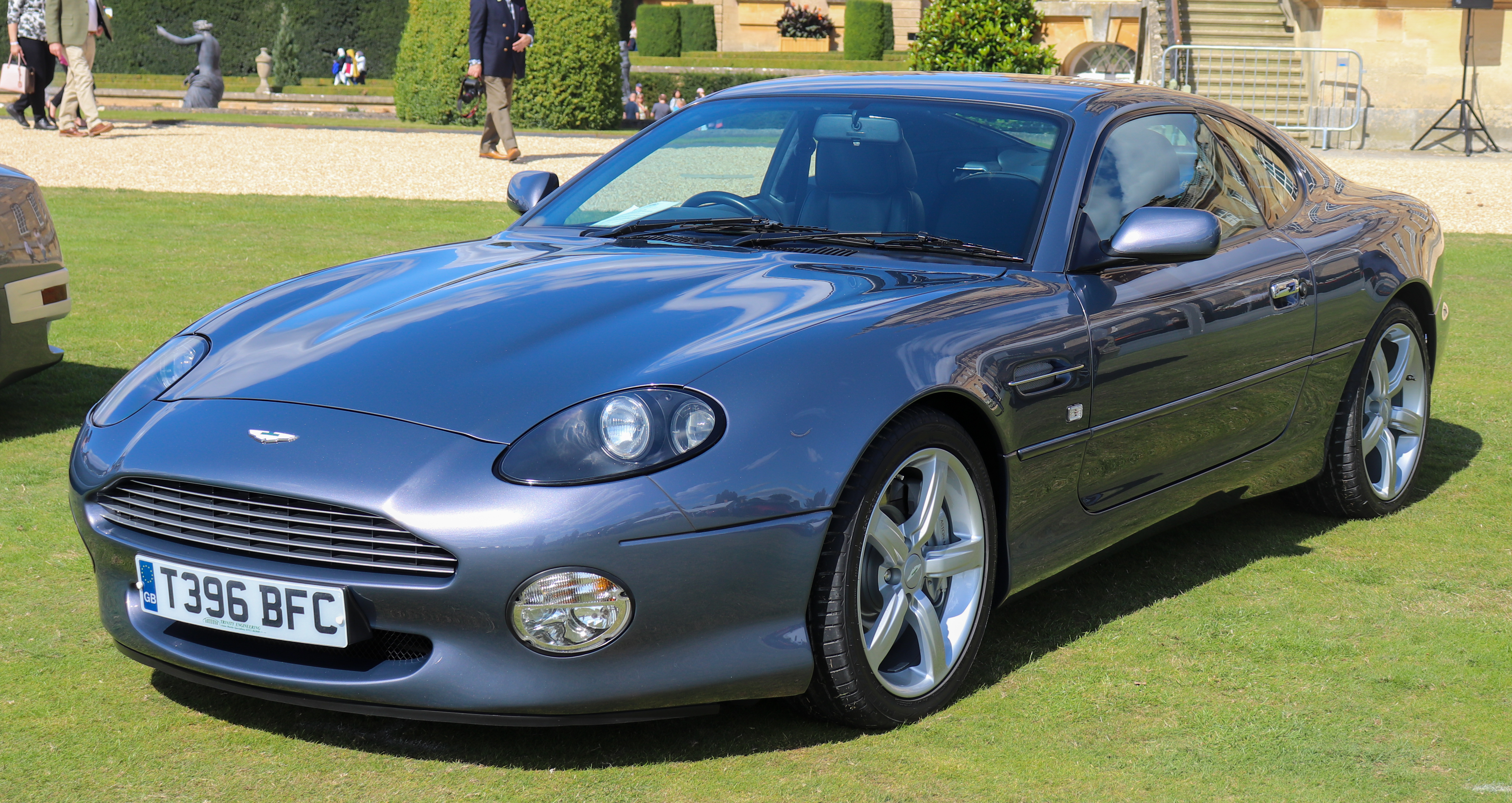
The DB7, which preceded the DB9

In 1994, Aston Martin, which Ford Motor Company owned at the time, began producing the DB7, a grand tourer positioned as an "entry-level" model within the company's lineup. (Note: An entry-level luxury vehicle is the cheapest vehicle in a luxury automaker's lineup.) It was the only Aston Martin that used steel monocoque construction, which was designed by Jaguar—a company that Ford also owned at the time. Designed by Ian Callum, the DB7 was available as both a coupe and convertible, the latter known as the Volante. In 1999, Aston Martin began manufacturing the DB7 Vantage, which featured a V12 engine developed by Ford in the United States. It became so popular that it started diverting sales from the six-cylinder model, leading to the latter's discontinuation later that year. The DB7 remained in production until 2004, when Aston Martin had produced about 7,000 examples. At the time, it was the best selling model in Aston Martin's history, though it was later surpassed by its successor, the DB9.

In the late 1990s, Aston Martin developed a model strategy that aimed to introduce various new technologies. Ford made significant investments in enhancing engine and structural technologies to create an entirely new platform, helping to restore Aston Martin's reputation as a desirable luxury automaker. The Vanquish, introduced in 2001 to replace the Virage, was the first car of this new era. Following the rejection of previous product proposals, the replacement for the DB7 was announced as the "DB9". This platform, named "vertical/horizontal", would underpin most mass-produced Aston Martins produced between 2003 and 2016. (Note: Excluding the DB11, which was produced from September 2016 and featured an all-new platform and architecture)

== Development ==
We started working on this after we did a V8 mid-engined car, which was the AM305 concept – I worked on that car at TWR with a small V8 in the back. Then Ulrich Bez took over the company at this point, and he didn't want a mid-engined car; he said Astons have to be front-engined. He obviously had an engineering strategy as well, where he could use the front end of the big car on the smaller one but I disagreed with him and said that it could be a mid-engined car […] and he had the view that British cars should never be mid-engined.

— Ian Callum

In July 2000, Ford appointed Ulrich Bez as chief executive officer and chairman of Aston Martin. The entry-level DB7 was due to be replaced by a car with the project codename "AM802", slated to be a 2+2 grand touring car. During this time, a third project was in development, codenamed "AM305". It was to be a smaller, two-seater car intended to compete with the Porsche 911 and the Ferrari 360. This car became the Vantage in 2005.

Callum was appointed as lead designer for the AM802 project. With the abrupt death of the designer Geoff Lawson in 1999, Callum had to alternate between designing at Jaguar and Aston Martin. Between 2000 and 2001, Bez requested that he work on two cars, the DB9 and what would become the V8 Vantage in 2005. Much of this work occurred at the Jaguar design centre in Whitley. The appointment of Henrik Fisker as lead designer in 2001 allowed Callum to focus principally on Jaguar. When asked by the magazine Car and Driver how much he had contributed to the vehicle, Callum replied, "I would say pretty much 100 per cent, including the interior. Maybe not the colour and trim and wood finishes but certainly the surfaces of the car."

Numerous DB9 pre-production prototypes and concepts were tested over various locations globally, amassing over 1,000,000 miles (1,600,000 km) collectively. Aston Martin conducted testing at the Ford Lommel Proving Grounds in Belgium as well as high-speed testing at the Nardò Ring in Italy, the Nürburgring in Germany, the MIRA test track and the Millbrook Proving Ground, the latter two in the United Kingdom. Aston Martin subjected the vehicles to hot-weather trials in Death Valley, the world's hottest location, and cold-weather evaluations within Sweden's Arctic Circle. Further tests occurred in New Zealand, encompassing both summer and winter conditions. Aston Martin deliberately destroyed most of the cars but three were retained and appeared in the film Casino Royale (2006). Following their cinematic appearances, all three vehicles were rendered undriveable.

The car debuted in September 2003 at the Frankfurt Motor Show. The official series manufacture of the DB9 coupe began in January 2004 at the Gaydon facility in Warwickshire, England; the DB9 marked the first model built there. In a 2007 interview, Bez stated that, though Aston Martin was traditionally a maker of more exclusive automobiles, he believed that the company needed to be more visible and build more cars. At launch, Aston Martin planned to produce between 1,400 and 1,500 examples annually.

== Design and specifications ==
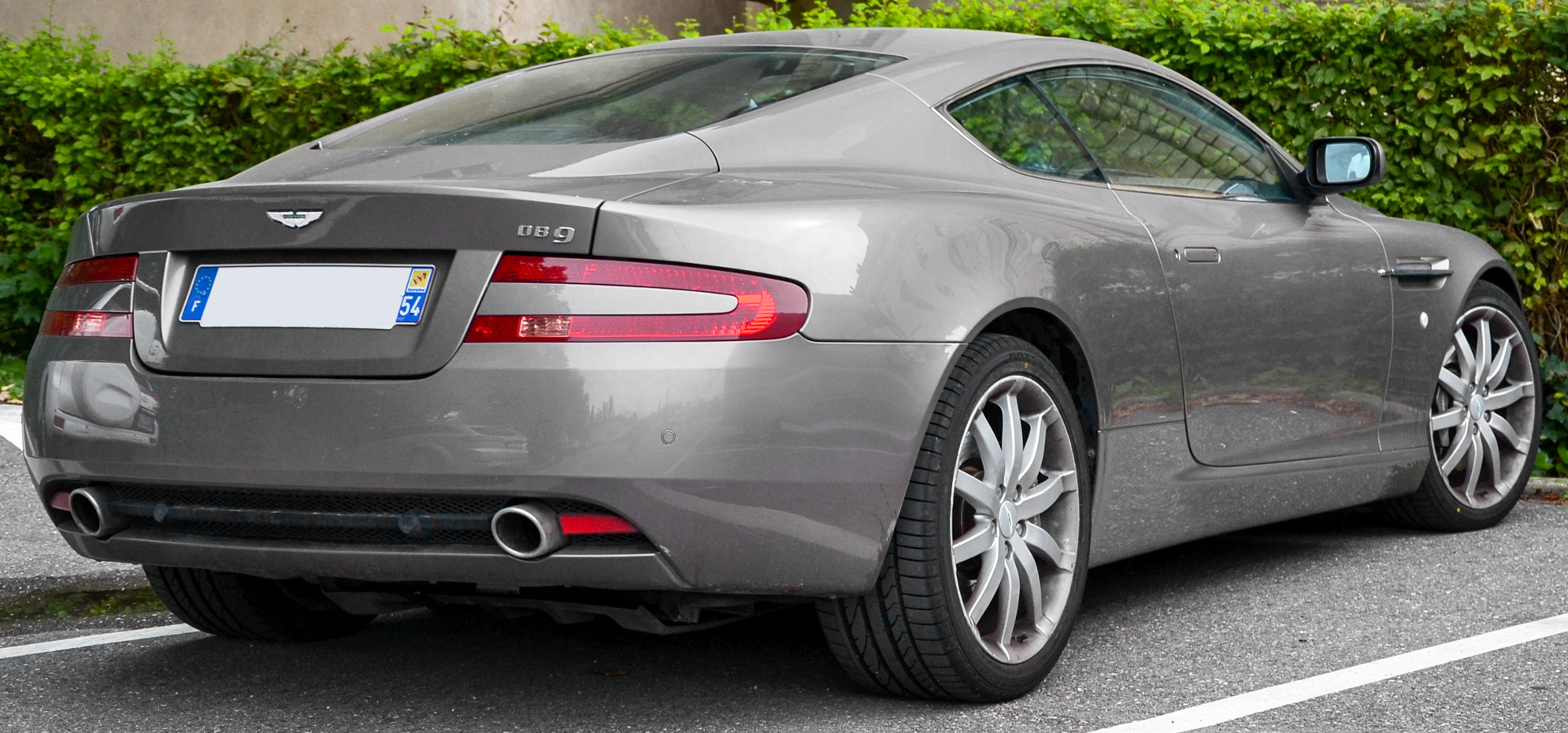
Rear 3/4 view

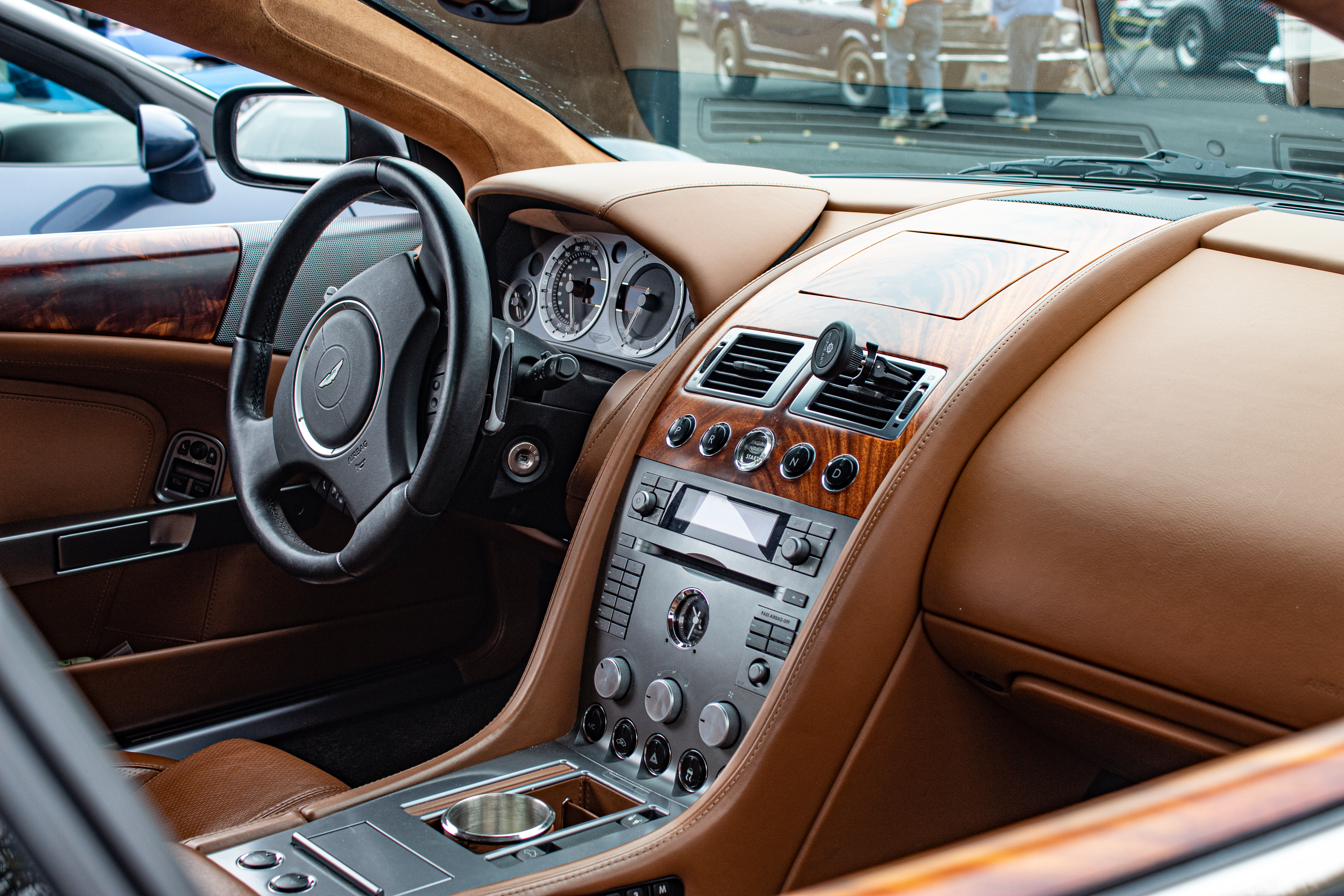
Interior

As opposed to its predecessor with a steel monocoque construction, the DB9, which uses the "vertical/horizontal" platform, employs aluminium extensively throughout its construction. The body structure comprises aluminium and composite materials melded together by mechanically fixed self-piercing rivets and robotic-assisted adhesive bonding techniques. The bonded aluminium structure possesses more than double the torsional rigidity of its predecessor despite being 25 per cent lighter. The DB9 also has anti-roll bars and double wishbone suspension supported by coil springs. The rear suspension incorporates additional anti-squat and anti-lift technology to control heavy acceleration or braking. While the DB9's exterior skin mostly consists of aluminium, the front bumpers and bonnet are made of composite materials. Its platform was later adapted for use by the Rapide, DBS, Vantage, Virage, 2012 Vanquish and Lagonda Taraf.

From the outset, Aston Martin intended for the front passenger cabin of the DB9 to incorporate a spacious, comfortable two-seater design; the rear passenger cabin—which also has two seats—was to be used more commonly as stowage space. The car's interior design was inspired by the 2001 Vanquish's but many alterations were made to differentiate the cars; for example, the air vents were mounted lower, leaving space for the pop-up satellite navigation positioned above. Instead of the Vanquish's red starter button, which was often described as "vulgar", Aston Martin opted for a clear glass button engraved with the brand's name, which illuminated blue when the ignition was on and red during engine operation. The DB9's interior is upholstered in leather and has a walnut wood trim. Satellite navigation and Bluetooth were initially optional but became standard in later models. Later models also offered a Dolby Prologic sound system connectable to satellite radio, a six-CD changer, an iPod connector, a USB connector, or an auxiliary input jack. A seating package, which removes the back seats and replaces the front seats with lighter seats made of Kevlar and carbon fibre, was available, deducting 17 kilograms (37 lb). The boot capacity is 187 L (6.6 cu ft) in the coupe or 136 L (4.8 cu ft) in the Volante.

The DB9 uses a 5.9-litre V12 engine. The original model's produces a maximum power output of 456 PS (335 kW; 450 hp) at 6,000 rpm and 570 N⋅m (420 lb⋅ft) of torque at 5,000 rpm. (Note: This and the following specifications are primarily about the 2004–2008 model; the specifications for later models are explained in the § updates section.) The DB9 can accelerate from 0 to 97 km/h (60 mph) in 4.7 seconds and has a top speed of 299 km/h (186 mph). Its rear-wheel drive layout and front mid-engine design improves weight distribution. The DB9 could be equipped with either a six-speed conventional manual gearbox manufactured by Graziano Trasmissioni or a six-speed ZF Friedrichshafen 'Touchtronic' automatic gearbox featuring paddle-operated semi-automatic mode. The automatic gearbox increases the 0 to 97 km/h (60 mph) acceleration time to 4.9 seconds, though the top speed remains the same. The gearbox is rear-mounted and is driven by a carbon-fibre tail shaft inside a cast aluminium torque tube. The DB9 launched with 483 mm (19 in) wheels, with the front ones measuring 216 mm (8.5 in) in width and the rear ones at 241 mm (9.5 in). Featuring Bridgestone Potenza 235/40ZR19 tyres in the front and 275/35ZR19 in the rear, the car's braking system relies on Brembo four-piston callipers.

== Updates ==
In 2008, the DB9 received a facelift. The car was largely unchanged; the updates included stylistic tweaks such as door mirrors resembling those of the DBS model, revised wheels and a grille with new elements integrated into its traditional design. The DB9's 5.9-litre V12 received an increase of 20 hp (15 kW) and 31 N⋅m (23 lbf⋅ft), achieved by increased compression and a deeper sump, reducing friction as the crankshaft moves through its oil bath. The car's maximum speed was raised to 306 km/h (190 mph) and its 0 to 97 km/h (60 mph) acceleration was decreased to 4.6 seconds. The car also received a revised "Touchtronic 2" gearbox with an electronic shift-by-wire control system. Upgrades were made to both the standard and sports pack suspension systems, replacing Dynamics dampers with Bilstein dampers. The change resulted in improved handling, addressing the previously harsh ride quality at low speeds.

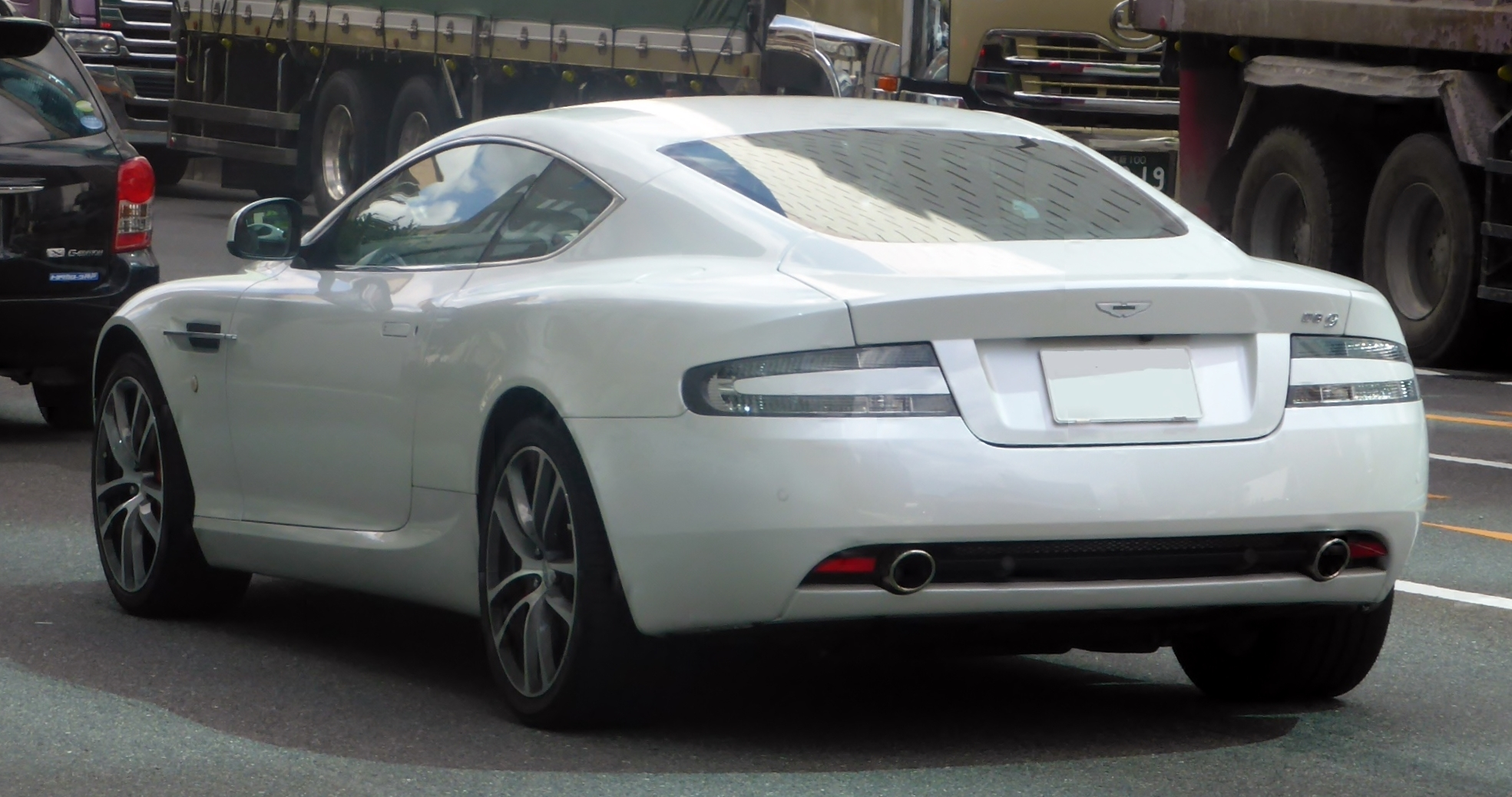
In 2010, the DB9 received clear glass tail-lights.

In June 2010, Aston Martin implemented another facelift for the DB9. Adjusted by Marek Reichman, the updates involved a refreshed front bumper, clear tail-lights and more defined front wings. A smoother body contour decorates the door sills, extending from the updated front fascia to the rear wings. Aston Martin updated the DB9's Bluetooth system, implemented a tyre-pressure monitoring system and included a new "Double Apex" aluminium trim finish. Buyers could upgrade to a Bang & Olufsen stereo sound system. About revising the styling of the DB9, Reichman quoted that "the beauty of an Aston Martin comes from harmonious proportions, a ground-hugging stance, taut surfacing and a complete and thorough attention to detail [...] The DB9 epitomises these qualities; it is beautiful but subtle—not attention seeking."

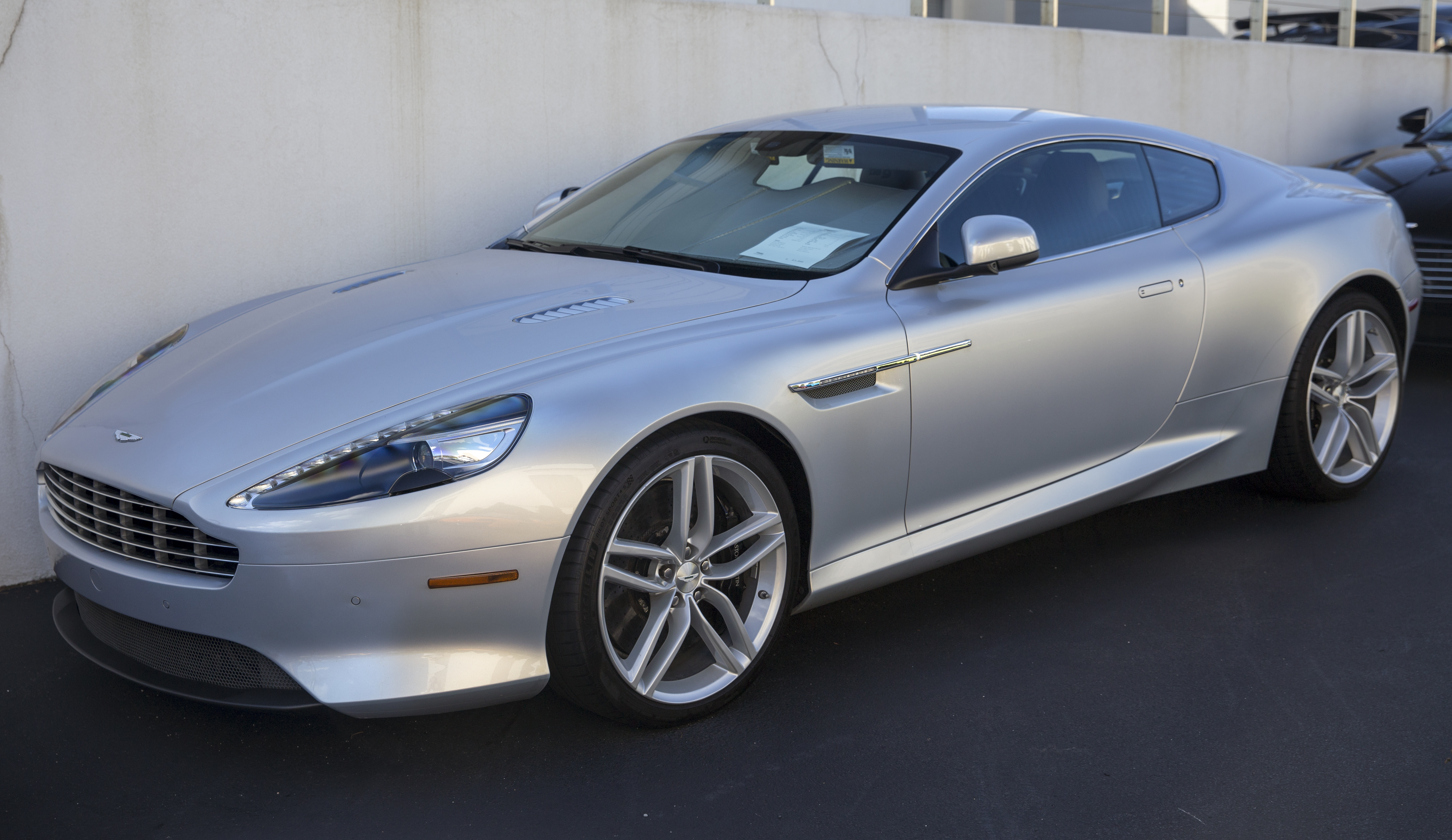
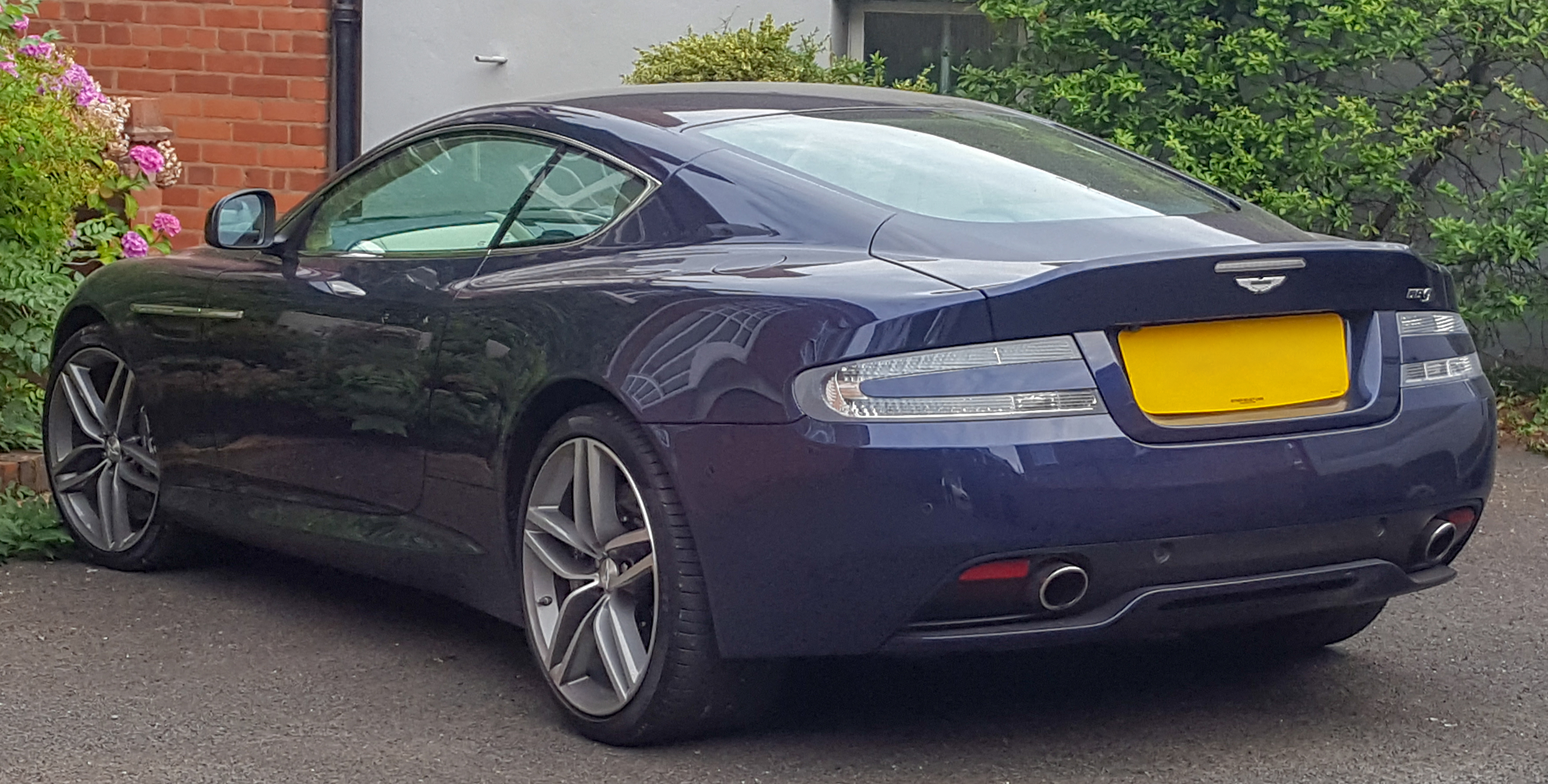
Front and rear of the 2013 DB9

In October 2012, Aston Martin unveiled the DB9's most substantial facelift, serving as the successor to the short-production second-generation Virage. Designed by Reichman, the facelifted DB9's most prominent changes lie in its exterior. Aston Martin made significant changes to the bodywork by adapting design cues from the Virage such as enlarging the recessed headlight clusters with bi-xenon lights and LED daytime running strips, implementing a new five-bar grille and integrating a new rear spoiler with the boot lid. The upgraded V12 increased its power output to 517 PS (380 kW; 510 hp) and torque to 620 N⋅m (457 lb⋅ft). The car's 0 to 97 km/h (60 mph) acceleration time decreased to 4.5 seconds, and the top speed stood at 295 km/h (183 mph). Aston Martin also introduced three driving modes: normal, suitable for daily driving; sport, offering enhanced precision at the expense of comfort; and track, intensifying the characteristics of the sport mode. The car's final update, the DB9 GT, increased its power output to 547 PS (402 kW; 540 hp).

== Variants ==
=== DB9 Volante ===
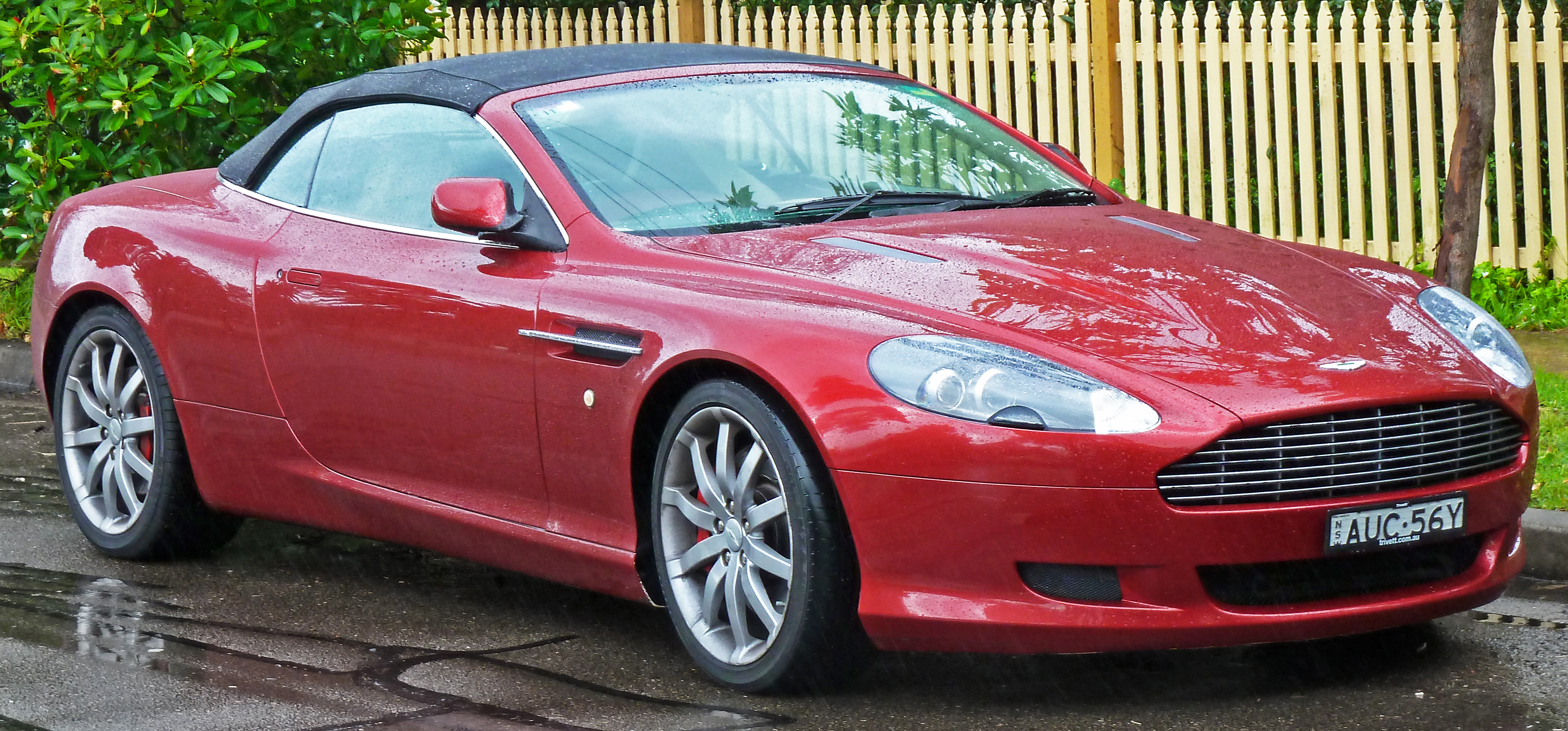
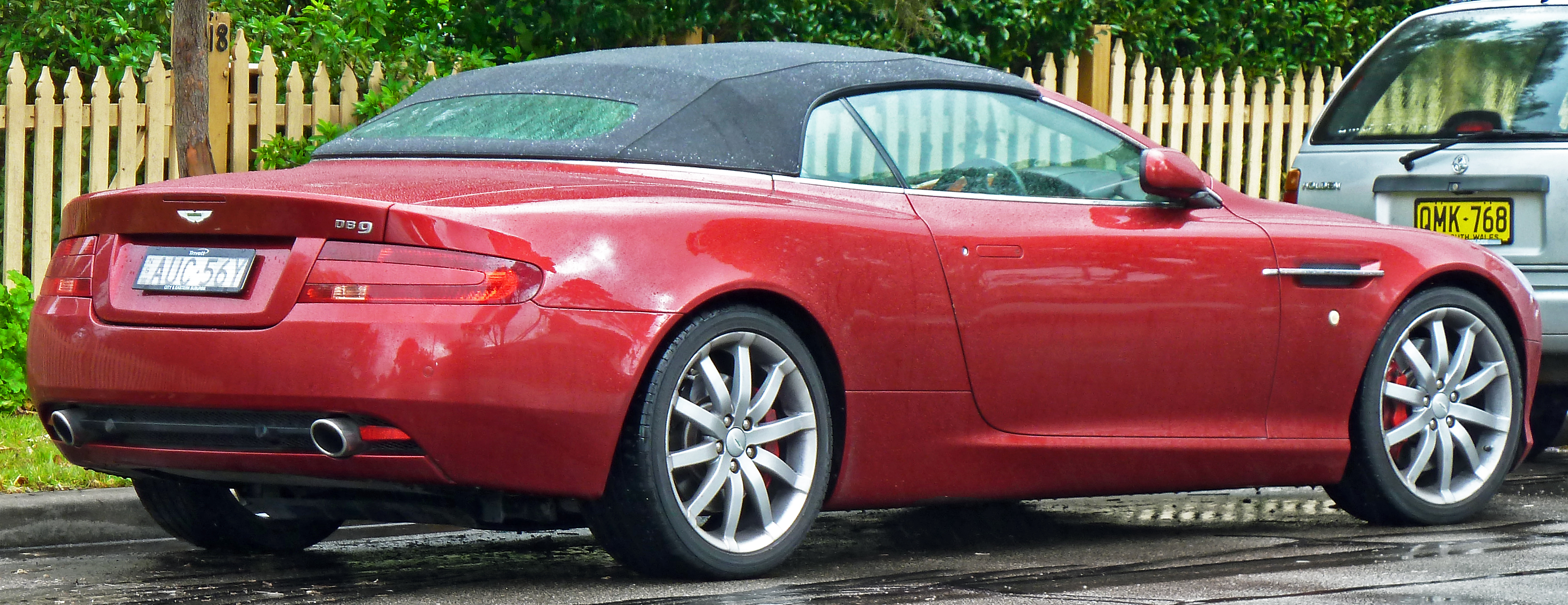
Aston Martin DB9 Volante (2005)

At the Detroit Auto Show in January 2004, Aston Martin unveiled the DB9 convertible version, known as the Volante; manufacture began in February 2005. In case of a rollover incident, the Volante features reinforced windshield pillars and two deployable hoops behind the rear seats. These hoops remain active at all times and, if triggered, will shatter the car's rear window. Aston Martin has adjusted the Volante's suspension system for smoother cruising by softening the springs and reducing the weight of the anti-roll bars, resulting in a more gentle suspension. The convertible top of the Volante is made of folding fabric and opens in seventeen seconds. The Volante weighs 1,882 kg (4,150 lb), slightly heavier than its coupe counterpart.

The coupe and Volante variants share the semi-automatic and automatic gearboxes along with the engine. Initially, the car's speed was limited to 266 km/h (165 mph) to retain the roof's integrity but Aston Martin removed this limitation starting with the upgraded 2007 model. Like the coupe, the original Volante has 570 N⋅m (420 lb⋅ft) of torque at 5,000 rpm and a maximum power of 456 PS (335 kW; 450 hp) at 6,000 rpm. The 0 to 97 km/h (60 mph) takes 4.9 seconds due to the additional weight. In 2008, the Volante's output increased to 477 PS (351 kW; 470 hp) and 600 N⋅m (443 lb⋅ft), and in 2012, outputs increased to 517 PS (380 kW; 510 hp) and 620 N⋅m (457 lb⋅ft), and its kerb weight reduced to 1,815 kg (4,001 lb).

=== Special editions ===
To commemorate Aston Martin's triumph in the GT1 category at the 2007 24 Hours of Le Mans, Aston Martin launched the DB9 LM (Le Mans) in early 2008. This special edition includes the DB9's optional sports pack as standard and is exclusively available in a coupe body style with an automatic transmission. It was only available in the "Sarthe Silver" exterior colour, named after the Circuit de la Sarthe, where the Le Mans takes place. It features red brake callipers, a chrome mesh grille, and a bespoke black leather interior with red stitching, featuring the Le Mans track stitched onto the central console. The car has clear glass taillights borrowed from the DBS. Aston Martin initially intended for a production run of 124 units, each allocated to a different dealer. However, some dealers opted out of their allocations, leading to 69 cars being produced.

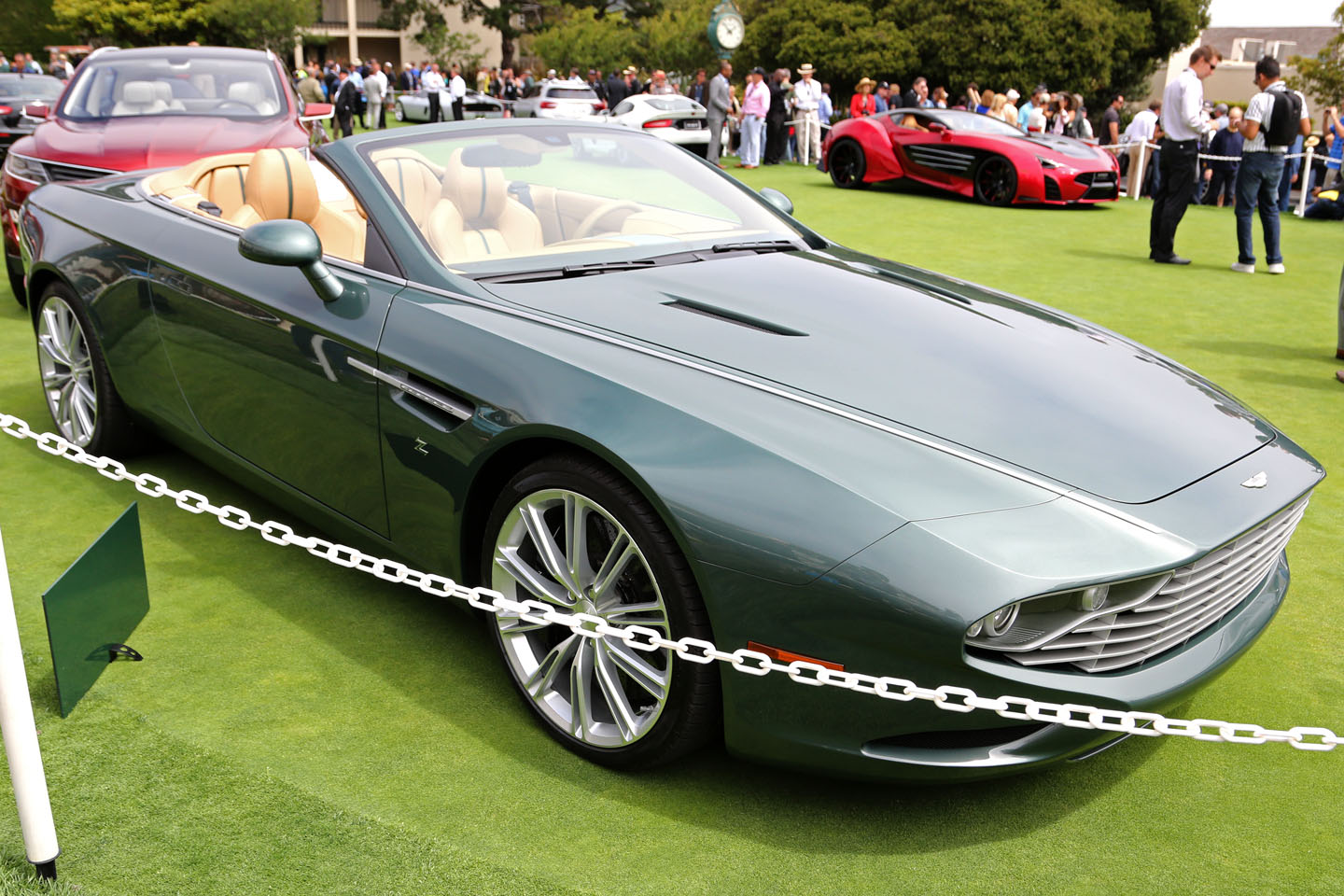
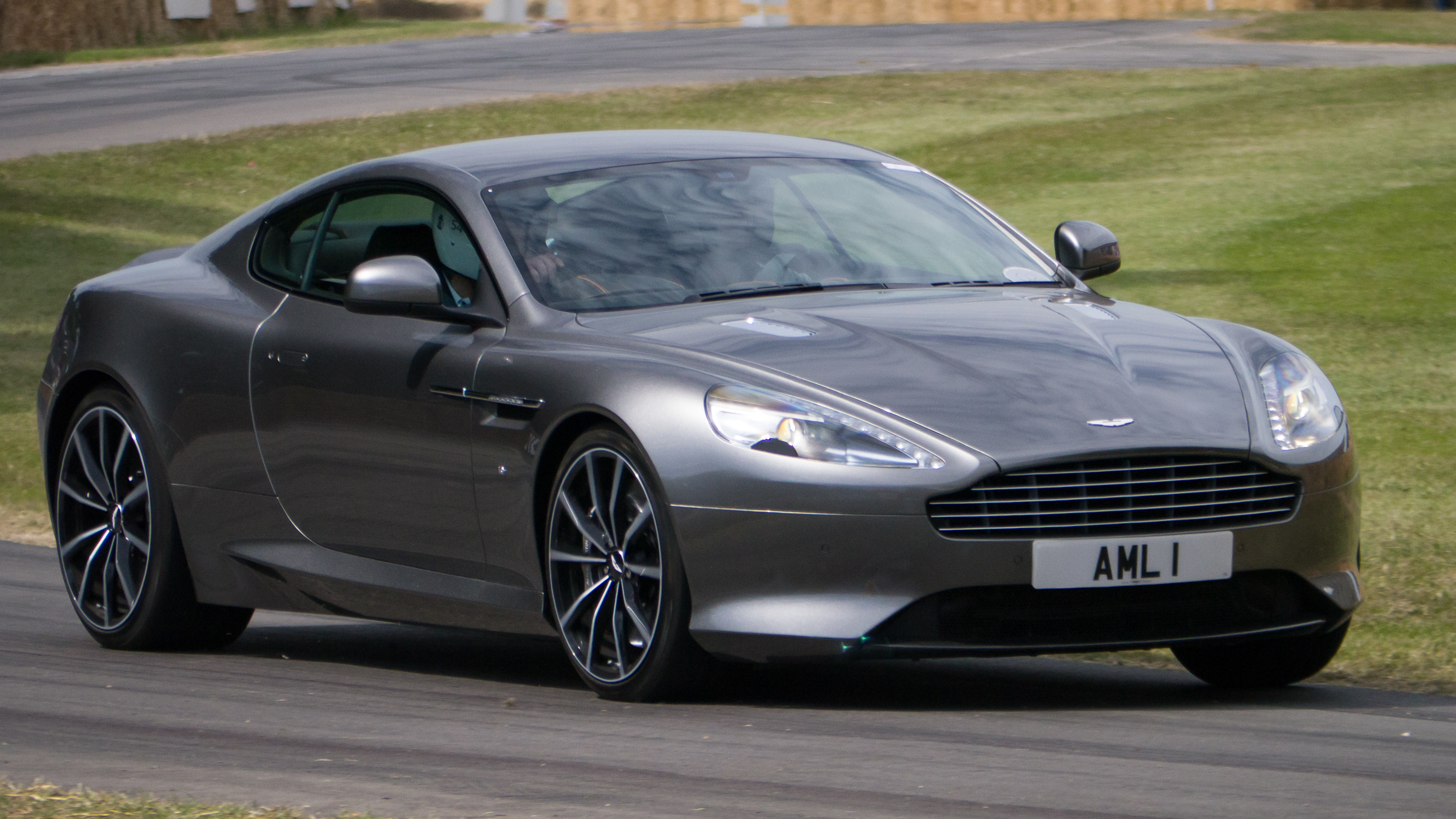
Special editions of the DB9 include the DB9 Zagato Centennial Spyder (left) and DB9 GT (right)

In 2013, for Aston Martin's 100-year anniversary, Zagato unveiled a one-off model based on the DB9 Volante called the "Zagato Spyder Centennial". Commissioned by the collector Peter Read, the car was painted green and revealed alongside the DBS Coupe Zagato Centennial. The car, with 2,300 miles (3,700 km) on the odometer, sold for US$693,000 (equivalent to $941,000 in 2025), including the buyer's fee, at RM Sotheby's Monterey auction during car week in 2015.

In 2015, Aston Martin unveiled the final iteration of the DB9, named the DB9 GT. The engine produces a power output of 547 PS (402 kW; 540 hp) at 6,750 rpm and 620 N⋅m (457 lb⋅ft) of torque at 5,500 rpm. It accelerates from 0 to 97 km/h (60 mph) in 4.4 seconds, from 0 to 161 km/h (100 mph) in 10.2 seconds, and can run the quarter-mile in 12.8 seconds. Its top speed remains unchanged at 295 km/h (183 mph).

== Discontinuation ==
In 2015, Aston Martin announced that the DB9's successor would be named the "DB11". The upcoming model range, which the DB11 was a part of, was to introduce a refreshed design approach directed by Reichman. Insider reports indicated that this model range aimed to address critiques of the existing lineup by emphasising distinctive differences among the models, aligning them more closely with the well-known Italian automaker Ferrari. On 22 July 2016, Aston Martin posted a picture on Twitter of the final nine DB9s—dubbed the "Last of 9"—produced, all of which were painted dark grey. On 27 July 2016, these last nine units had their final inspection before rolling off the production line later that day, marking the end of a twelve-year manufacture during which about 16,500 units were manufactured.

== Motorsport ==
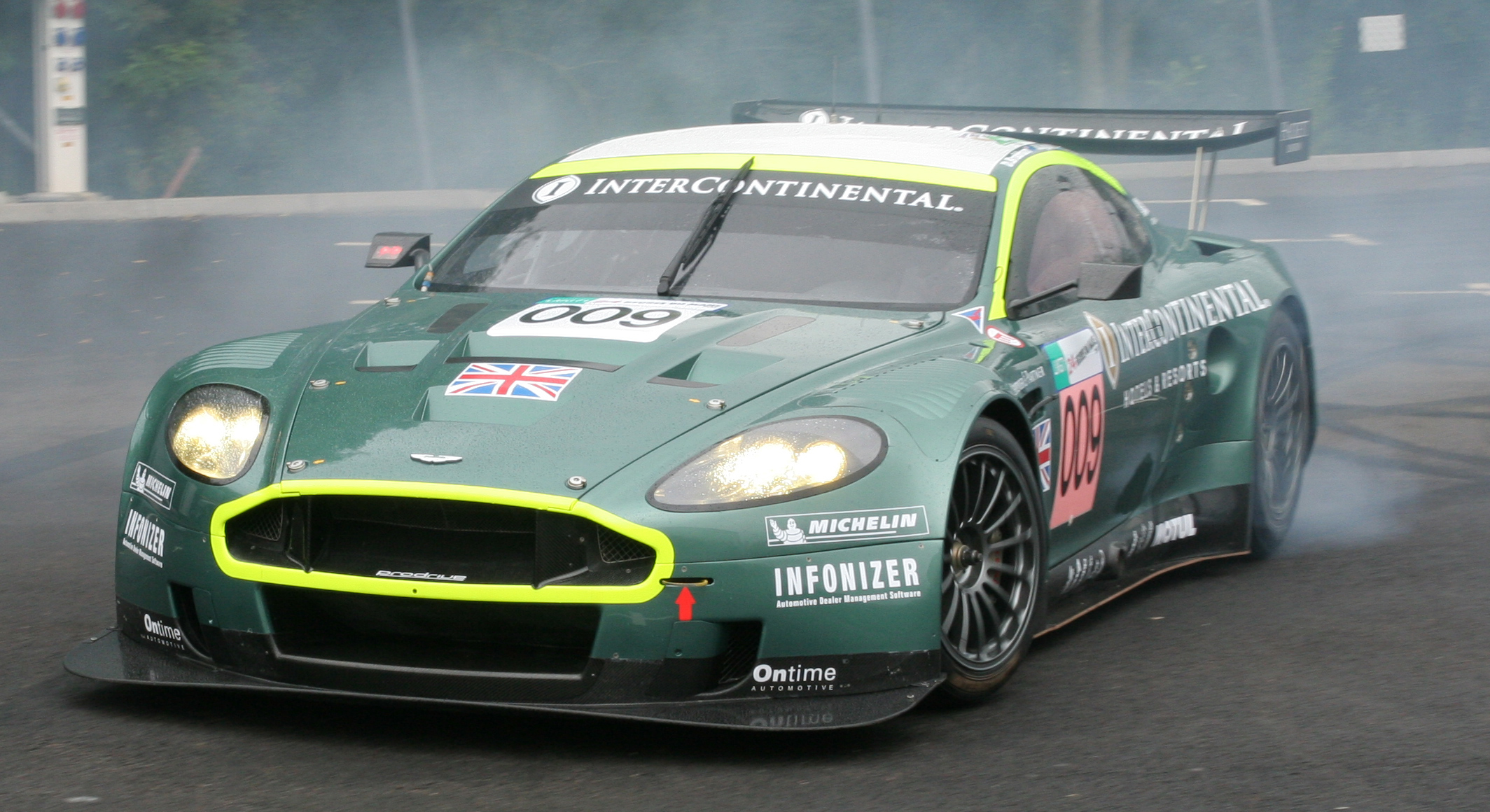
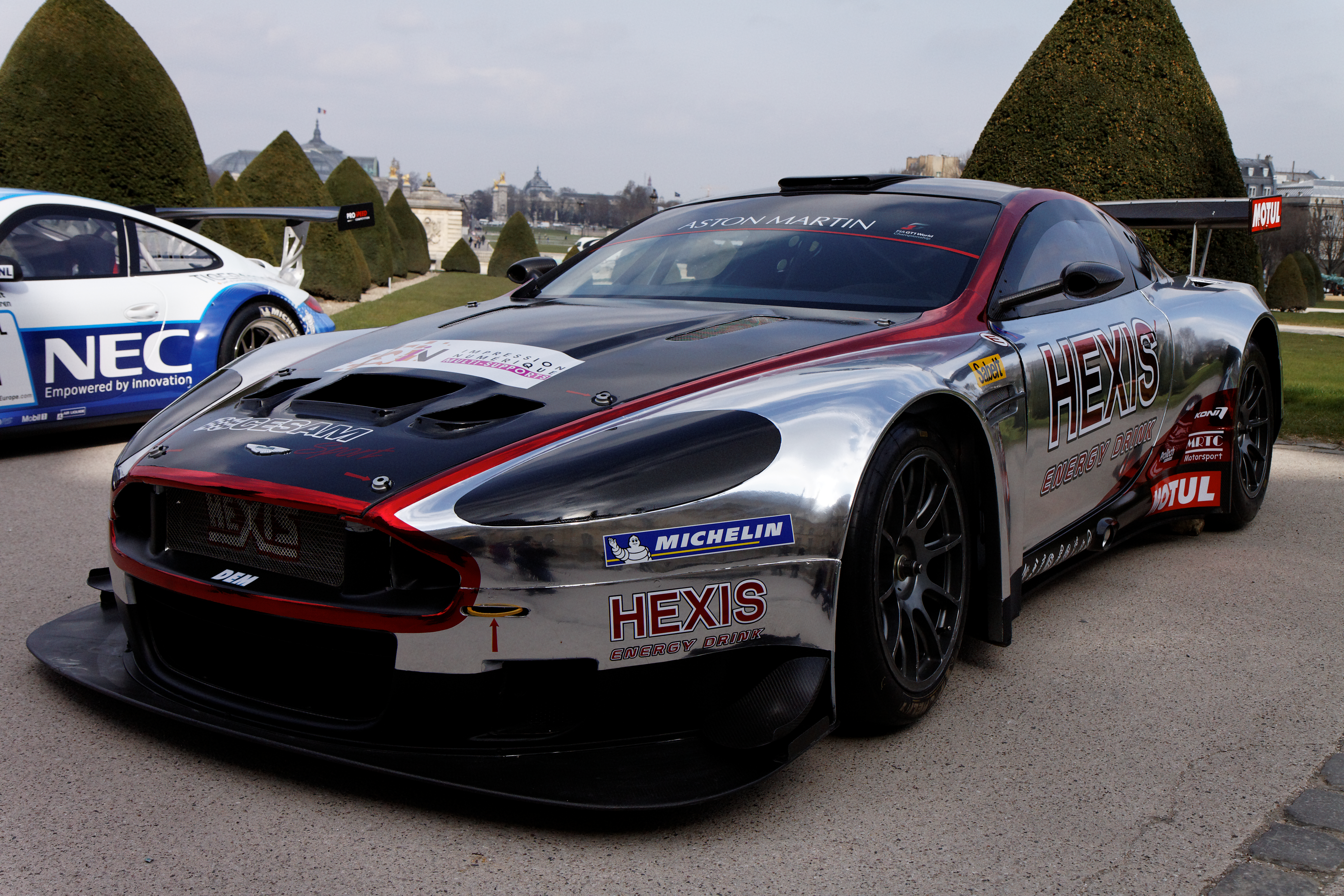
Aston Martin DBR9 (top) and DBRS9 (bottom)

The DB9 has been adapted for use in sports car racing by Aston Martin Racing (AMR), a collaboration between Aston Martin and Prodrive. The DBR9, developed to follow FIA GT1 regulations, debuted in 2005. AMR replaced most of the car's aluminium body panels with carbon fibre panels, and several external features, like a front splitter and a rear wing, have been added to increase the car's downforce. AMR upgraded the brakes to lightweight Brembo discs and six-piston callipers. The transmission in the DBR9 is an Xtrac six-speed sequential manual mounted at the rear axle. The engine modifications allow it to have a power output of 634 PS (466 kW; 625 hp). The increase in engine power and weight reduction allowed the DBR9 to accelerate from 0 to 97 km/h (60 mph) in 3.4 seconds and 0 to 161 km/h (100 mph) in 6.4 seconds. The DBR9 won in its debut at the 2005 12 Hours of Sebring and has since secured victories in various other events, including the 24 Hours of Le Mans.

AMR developed a variant of the DBR9 to follow FIA GT3 regulations. The DBRS9 shares its carbon-fibre bodywork, chassis and suspension layout with the DBR9. While the engine is shared with the DBR9, it has been detuned and has a power output of 558 PS (410 kW; 550 hp) and 620 N⋅m (457 lb⋅ft) of torque. The DBRS9 featured a six-speed gearbox or a six-speed sequential gearbox and has a 0 to 97 km/h (60 mph) acceleration time of 3.4 seconds and a top speed of 314 km/h (195 mph). The DBRS9 competed in several endurance races and additionally raced in the FIA GT3 European Championship for which it was designed before being replaced by a GT3 version of the V12 Vantage in 2011.

== Reception ==
Car critics have generally lauded the DB9 coupe and Volante, commending their opulent interior and exterior designs. The automotive show Top Gear held the DB9 in high regard, even giving it a special mention in its "Cool Wall" segment. The presenters called the DB9 "too cool" for the wall, however, and it earned its own category dubbed "the DB9 Fridge", likened to a mini-refrigerator containing the car's card. While reviewing the Volante, Richard Hammond called the interior of the DB9 "one of the best known to man", although he found the car to be less rigid than the coupe, leading to a somewhat "wobbly" experience.

The car reviewers Edmunds and the magazine Road & Track criticised the DB9 for having poorer handling than its competitors and thought that the car is not firm enough. Nonetheless, Edmunds acknowledged that while the Mercedes-Benz SL600 and SL55 AMG were objectively better cars, the DB9 was more desirable. In direct comparisons with faster cars like the Porsche 911 Turbo S Cabriolet and the Ford GT, the DB9 was ranked poorly; a Car and Driver reviewer felt that comparing it against faster cars "highlighted its shortcomings". Similarly, compared to the Bentley Continental GT, Mercedes-Benz CL600, and the Ferrari 612 Scaglietti F1, the DB9 ranked poorly again, though reviewers said that "despite its problems, the DB9 would be [their] personal choice". The stiffness issues were largely rectified in later iterations of the DB9, as observed by the magazine Autoweek.

The DB9's interior has been called "dazzling", with Edmunds saying, "[w]ords like 'rich' and 'crafted' just don't cut it, though 'decadent' and 'sculpted by the Almighty himself' get close". Reviewers complained about the back seats, with the magazine Forbes stating that they "[thought] of it more as a padded parcel shelf". Likewise, reviewers complained that the space for cargo was limited, though many quipped the small back seats could help hold luggage. Another common complaint was the car's poor satellite navigation system, which the magazine Automobile described as an Achilles' heel, describing selecting a route as "painful at best". Newer models contain a revised satellite navigation system sourced from Garmin.

== Bibliography ==
- Dowsey, David (2007), Aston Martin: Power, Beauty and Soul, The Images Publishing Group, ISBN 978-0-9578-7595-1
- Henry, Alan (2005), Driven Man: David Richards, Prodrive, and the Race to Win, Motorbooks International, ISBN 978-1-6106-0915-9
- Lamm, John (2008), Exotic Cars, Motorbooks, ISBN 978-1-6167-3073-4
- Llorella, Anja (2004), Luxury Toys, Kempen, Germany: teNeues Publishing Company, ISBN 978-3-8238-4591-1
- Loveys, Richard (2015), Aston Martin, Bloomsbury: Bloomsbury Publishing, ISBN 978-1-7844-2074-1
- Noakes, Andrew (2019) [2017], Aston Martin DB: 70 Years, London: Quarto Publishing Group UK, ISBN 978-1-7813-1928-4
- Norris, Ian (2006), Automobile Year 2006/07, Christian Philippsen, ISBN 978-2-9162-0604-2
- Phillips, Adam (2012) [2005], Supercars: Driving the Dream, New York: Rosen Publishing Group, ISBN 978-1-4488-9218-1
- Quinlan, Julia J. (2013), Aston Martin, New York: Rosen Publishing, ISBN 978-1-4777-1060-9
- Robson, Graham (2017), Cosworth: The Search for Power (6th ed.), Dorset, UK: Veloce Publishing, ISBN 978-1-8458-4895-8
- Taylor, James (2024), Aston Martin DB9 and Vanquish: The Complete Story, Wiltshire, UK: Crowood Press, ISBN 978-0-7198-4316-7
