= Andrew Noakes =

Lecturer in journalism

Andrew Noakes is an Associate Senior Lecturer in journalism, specialising in automotive journalism, at the Coventry University Department of Media and Communication.

== Early career ==
An award-winning motoring journalist, author and photographer, he originally trained as an engineer at Loughborough University. After two years of working as a freelance motoring journalist he joined Fast Car, where he concentrated on technical articles and in-depth product tests. He quickly rose to the position of Deputy Editor.

In 1996 Andrew became editor of Retro, a magazine for modified classic cars, re-launching the magazine a year later as Classics, now Classics Monthly. He became editor-in-chief in 2000 overseeing Classics and the launch of a new internet magazine.

== Freelance motoring journalism ==
He returned to freelance writing in 2002 and has written for numerous car magazines including CAR, Auto Express, Classic & Sports Car, Classic Cars, Classic Car Weekly, Redline, Total Impreza, Total Evolution, V Magazine, BMW Magazine and European Automotive Design. He has contributed to automotive websites CAR Online and PistonHeads.com and runs his website, andrewnoakes.com.

He has written or contributed to a dozen books on motoring and motorsport. His latest, Ford Cosworth DVF: The Inside Story of F1s Greatest Engine, was awarded the Guild of Motoring Writers Timo Makinen Trophy in 2007.

In 2011, he launched the online automotive technology magazine CarTechnical.co.uk.
