= Aston Martin DBS (2007) =

Aston Martin vehicle

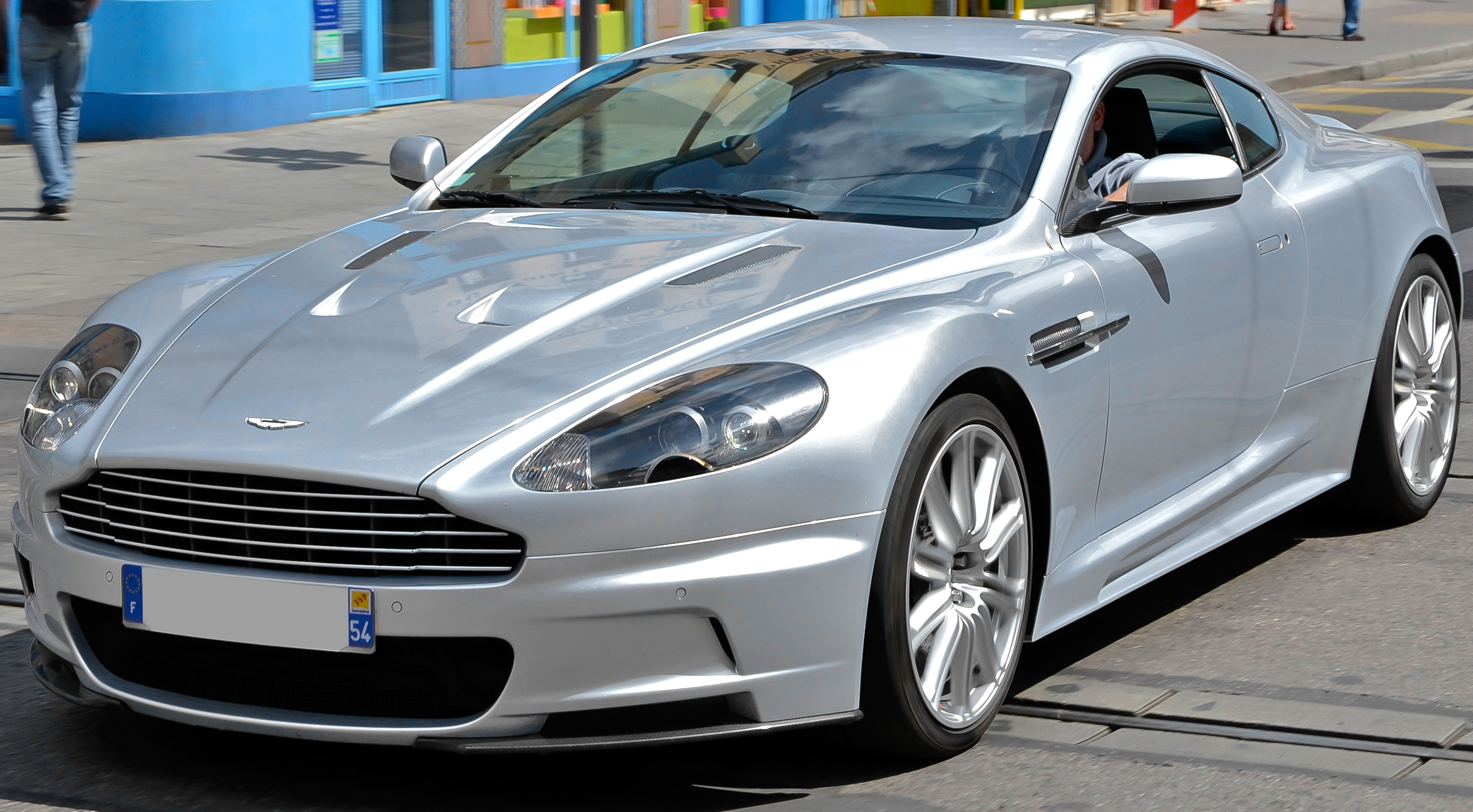

Overview
- Manufacturer: Aston Martin Lagonda Limited
- Production: 2007–2012; 3,381 units
- Model years: 2008–2012
- Assembly: United Kingdom: Gaydon, Warwickshire
- Designer: Marek Reichman

Body and chassis
- Class: Grand tourer (S)
- Body style: 2-door coupé; 2-door convertible; 2-door 2+2 coupé and convertible
- Layout: Front mid-engine, rear-wheel-drive
- Platform: VH Generation II
- Doors: Swan
- Related: Aston Martin DB9; Aston Martin Virage (Second generation); Aston Martin V12 Vantage; Aston Martin DBS Zagato Centennial

Powertrain
- Engine: 5.9 L AM08 V12
- Transmission: 6-speed ZF 6HP26 (Touchtronic II) automatic; 6-speed Graziano manual

Dimensions
- Wheelbase: 107.9 in (2,741 mm)
- Length: 185.9 in (4,722 mm)
- Width: 81.1 in (2,060 mm)
- Height: 50.4 in (1,280 mm)
- Kerb weight: 1,695 kg (3,737 lb) (Coupé); 1,810 kg (3,990 lb) (Volante)

Chronology
- Predecessor: Aston Martin Vanquish (First generation)
- Successor: Aston Martin Vanquish (Second generation)

The Aston Martin DBS is a grand tourer based on the DB9 and manufactured by the British luxury automobile manufacturer Aston Martin.

Aston Martin has used the DBS name once before on their 1967–1972 grand tourer coupé. The modern car replaced the 2004 Vanquish S as the flagship of the marque. The DBS ended production in 2012 and was succeeded by the second-generation of the Vanquish.

== Models ==
=== DBS (2007–2012) ===
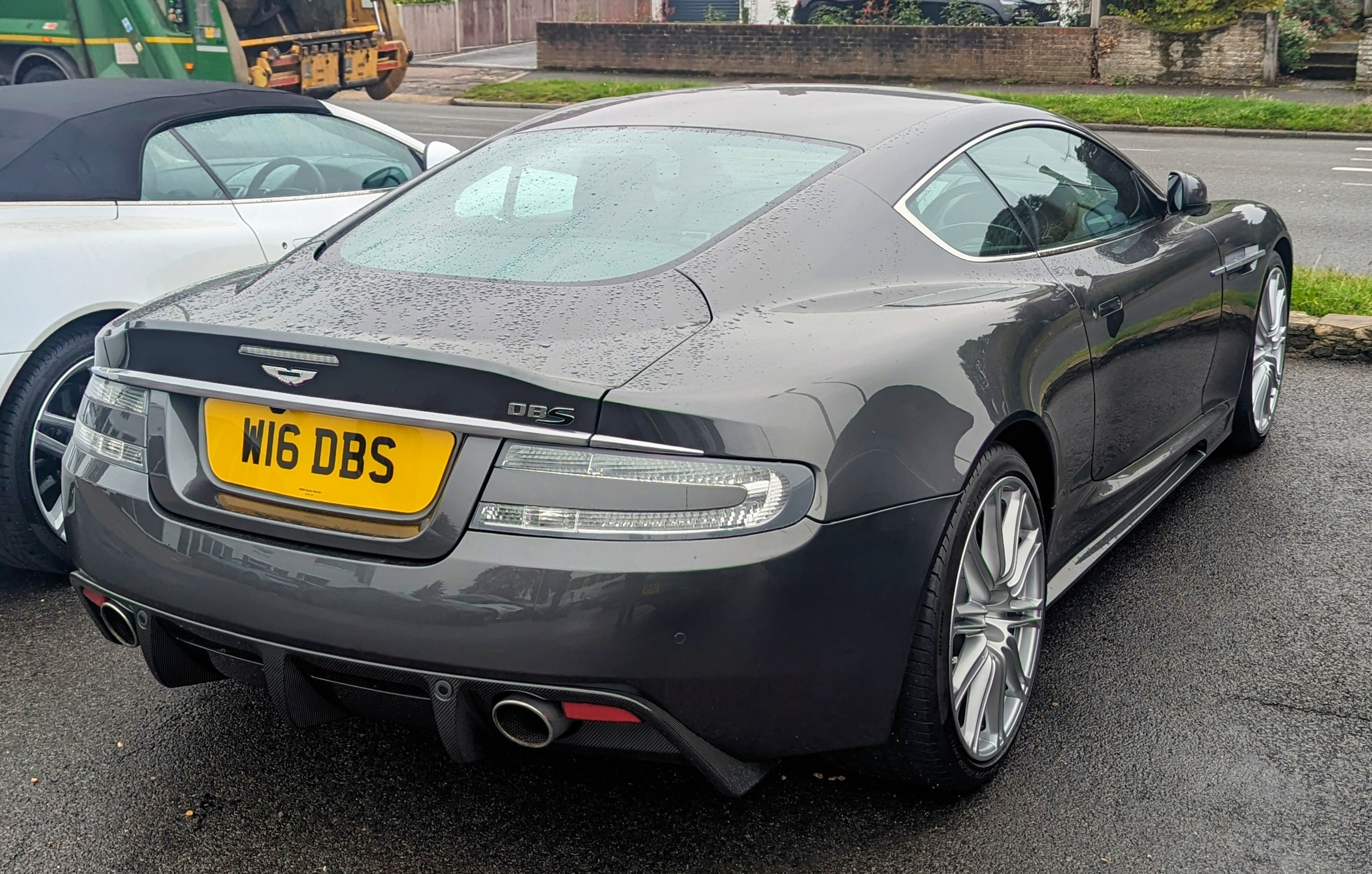
Aston Martin DBS

The DBS was officially unveiled at the 2007 Pebble Beach Concours d'Elegance on 16 August 2007, which featured a brand new exterior colour (graphite grey with a blue tint) which has been dubbed "Lightning Silver".

Deliveries of the DBS began in the first quarter of 2008.

=== DBS Volante (2009–2012) ===
The convertible version of the DBS called the DBS Volante was unveiled at the 2009 Geneva Motor Show on 3 March 2009.

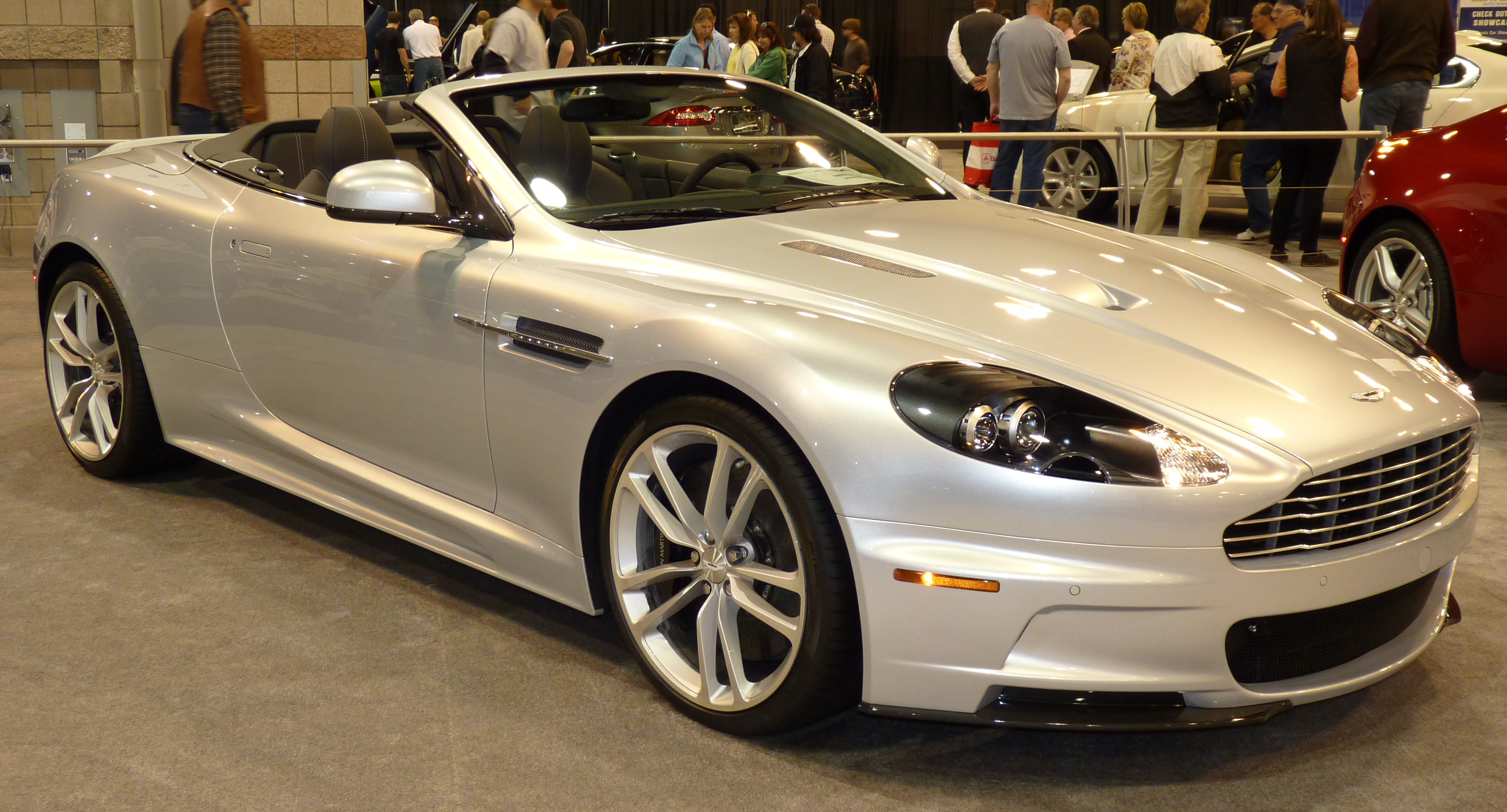
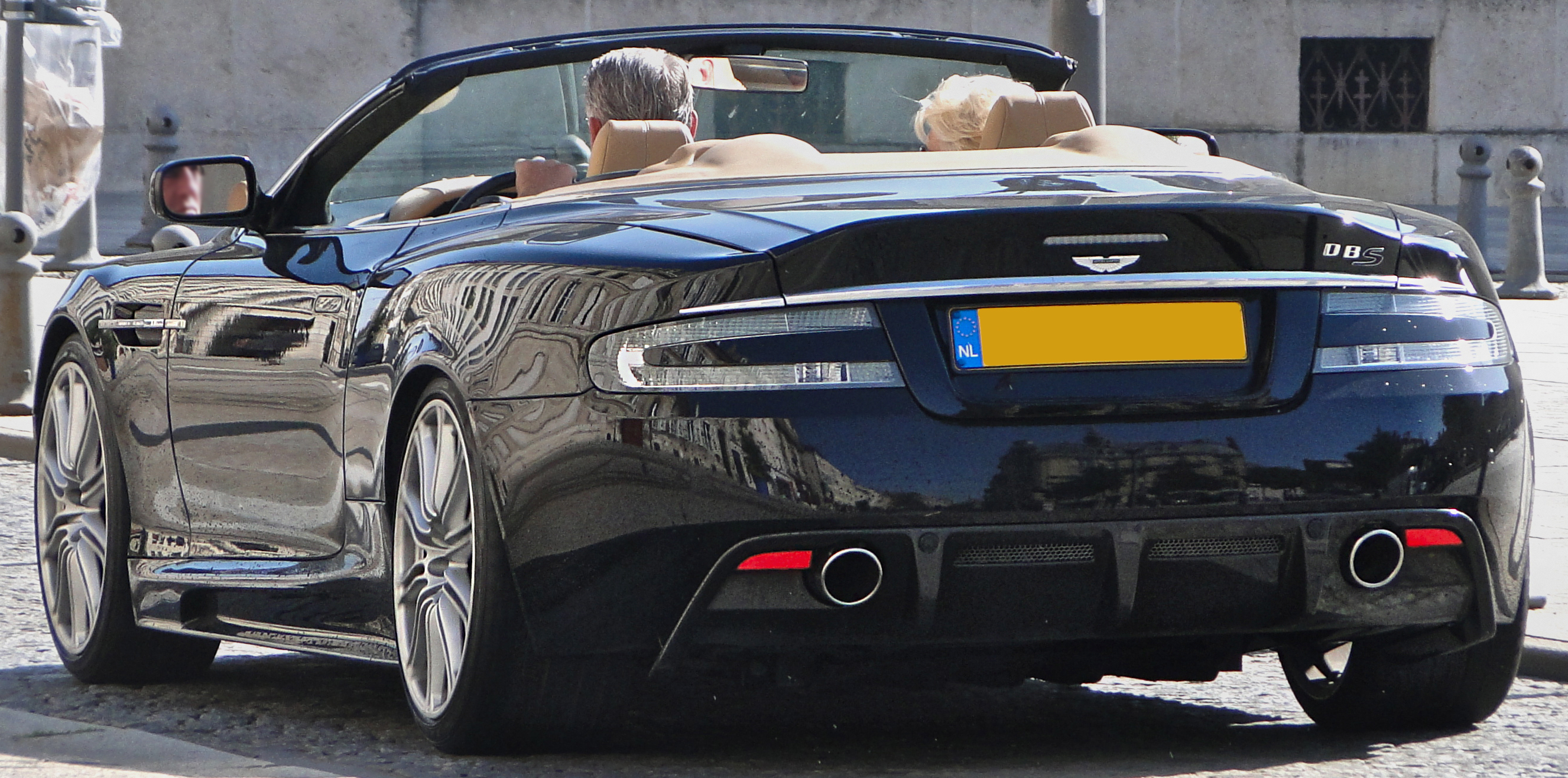
Aston Martin DBS Volante

The DBS Volante includes a motorized retractable fabric roof controlled by a button in the centre console and can fold into the compartment located behind the seats in 14 seconds after the press of the button. The roof can be opened or closed while at speeds up to 48 km/h (30 mph). Apart from the roof, changes include a new wheel design available for both the coupé and volante versions and a 2+2 seating configuration also available for both versions. Other features include rear-mounted six-speed manual or optional six-speed ‘Touchtronic 2’ automatic gearbox, Bang & Olufsen BeoSound in-car entertainment system with 13 speakers. With a kerb weight of 1,810 kg (3,990 lb), the Volante is heavier than the coupe due to chassis stiffening modifications. The Volante accelerates from 0 to 100 km/h (62 mph) in 4.3 seconds and has a maximum speed of 307 km/h (191 mph).

Deliveries of the DBS Volante began in the third quarter of 2009.

=== Carbon Black, UB-2010 Limited Edition (2010) ===
In 2010, Aston Martin introduced two special editions of the DBS.

Available for the DBS and V12 Vantage, the "Carbon Black" edition includes unique carbon black paint work (as well as orange and grey), Touchtronic gearbox, obsidian black or orange interior and lightweight seats.

The DBS UB-2010 Limited Edition is a limited (20 DBS coupés and twenty DBS Volantes) version of the DBS coupé and Volante named after Dr. Ulrich Bez, the then CEO of Aston Martin Lagonda Limited, commemorating the tenth year of his appointment. This edition comes with the Touchtronic gearbox or a 6-speed manual gearbox upon request, Azurite Black exterior colour, blue brake calipers and a bronze coloured interior.

The DBS UB-2010 Limited Edition was unveiled at the 80th Geneva Motor Show.

=== 2011 DBS Carbon Edition (2011–2012) ===
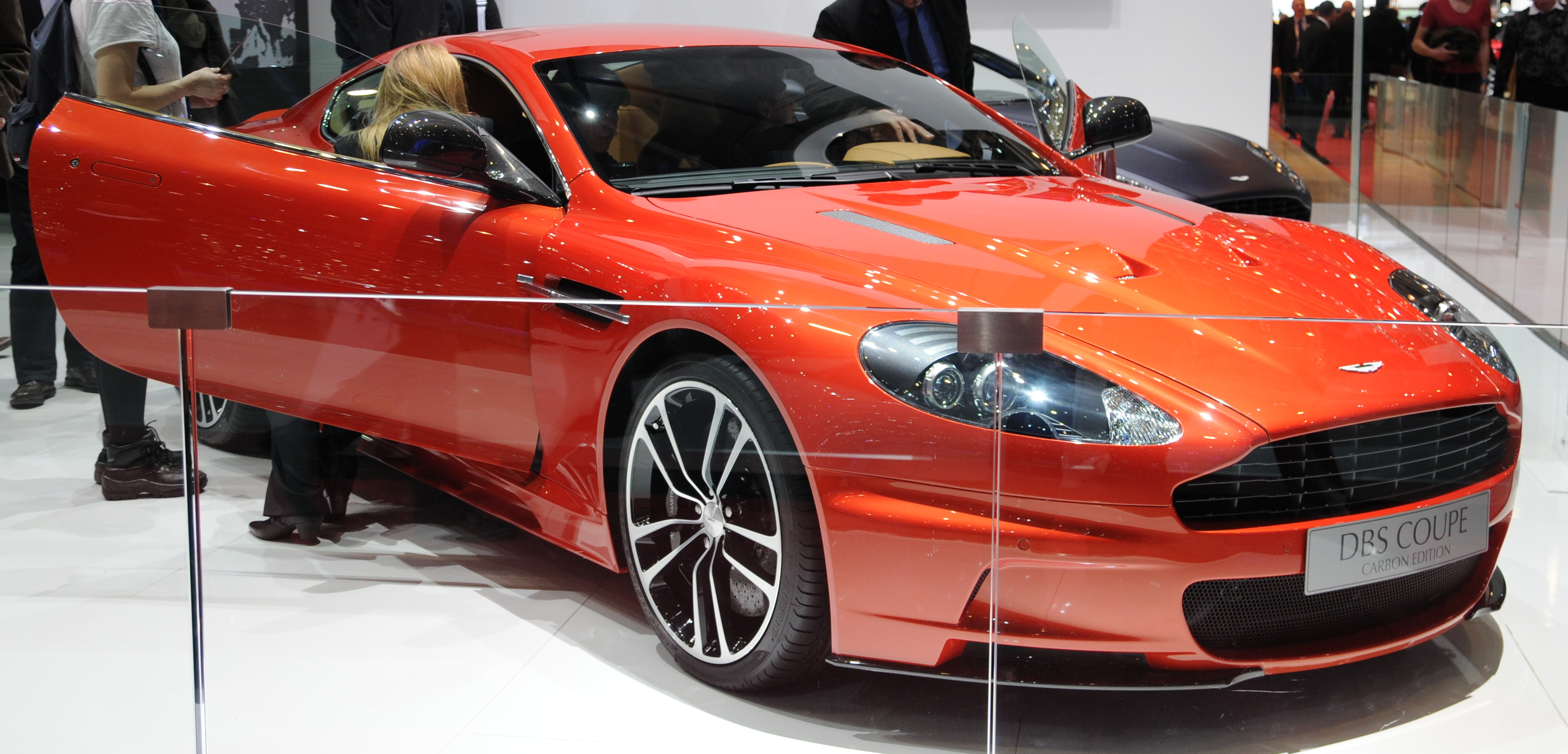
A DBS Carbon Edition showcased in the 2012 Geneva International Motor Show

At the end of its production run, Aston Martin introduced a final edition of the DBS, named the Carbon Edition. Available as both a coupé and Volante (convertible), it had a choice of three body colours (Flame Orange, Ceramic Grey, Carbon Black) with glass veneer appearance (optional satin lacquer paint finish), 10-spoke gloss black diamond turned wheels with a reversed diamond turned (optional full gloss black) finish, black (optional yellow, orange, red or grey) brake callipers, warm black grille, carbon fibre mirror heads, carbon fibre rear lamp in-fills, smoked rear lights, Obsidian Black or Maranello Orange semi-aniline leather upholstery, leather-quilted headlining, carbon fibre trim with a carbon weave positioned to follow the form of the dashboard, unique carbon fibre special edition sill plaque with laser etched metal inlay, Aston Martin Garmin satellite navigation system and beam blade windscreen wipers.

The Carbon Edition was unveiled at the 2011 Frankfurt Motor Show.

Deliveries began in the third quarter of 2012.

=== Year of the Dragon 88 Limited Edition (2012) ===
The DBS Volante Dragon 88 honours the Year of the Dragon in China. It has 24-carat gold plate on nickel-coated Aston Martin wing badges affixed to the bonnet and rear of each car, bright finish front grille, bonnet meshes and side strakes; choice of three unique 10-spoke designs lightweight forged wheels with a special silver finish, Black brake callipers, a choice of 3 body colours (Amethyst Red, Volcano Red, Champagne Gold) with matching interior upholstery colours (Spicy Red, Deep Purple, Chancellor Red interior for Amethyst Red, Volcano Red, Champagne Gold body respectively), Sahara Tan thread stitching, Piano Black facia trim with a unique gold inlay pattern at dashboard, glass switchgear, headrest embroidery design with rendered using four thread colours (Metallic Gold, Cream Truffle, Winter Wheat and Kestrel Tan) inspired by the Nine-Dragon Wall in Beihai Park, unique laser-etched sill plaques bearing the number and designation, Presentation Box wrapped in the same leather as the interior of their car and lined with Ivory Alcantara (box lid bears an embroidered dragon, with Aston Martin wings embossed on to the front of the lid and a replica sill plaque on the inside of the lid; each box contains an Owner's Guide with gold detailing, two glass ECUs with leather pouches, a pair of customised Bang & Olufsen earphones with laser-etched Aston Martin wings in a leather pouch) and a 1,000-Watt Bang & Olufsen audio system.

The DBS Volante Dragon 88 was unveiled at the 2012 Beijing International Automotive Exhibition and production was limited to 88 units.

=== DBS Coupe Zagato Centennial ===
At the firm's 100 year anniversary in Kensington Park, Zagato presented a unique car based on the DBS. It was commissioned by a Japanese entrepreneur and was painted blue. It was revealed along with the DB9 Zagato Spyder Centennial.

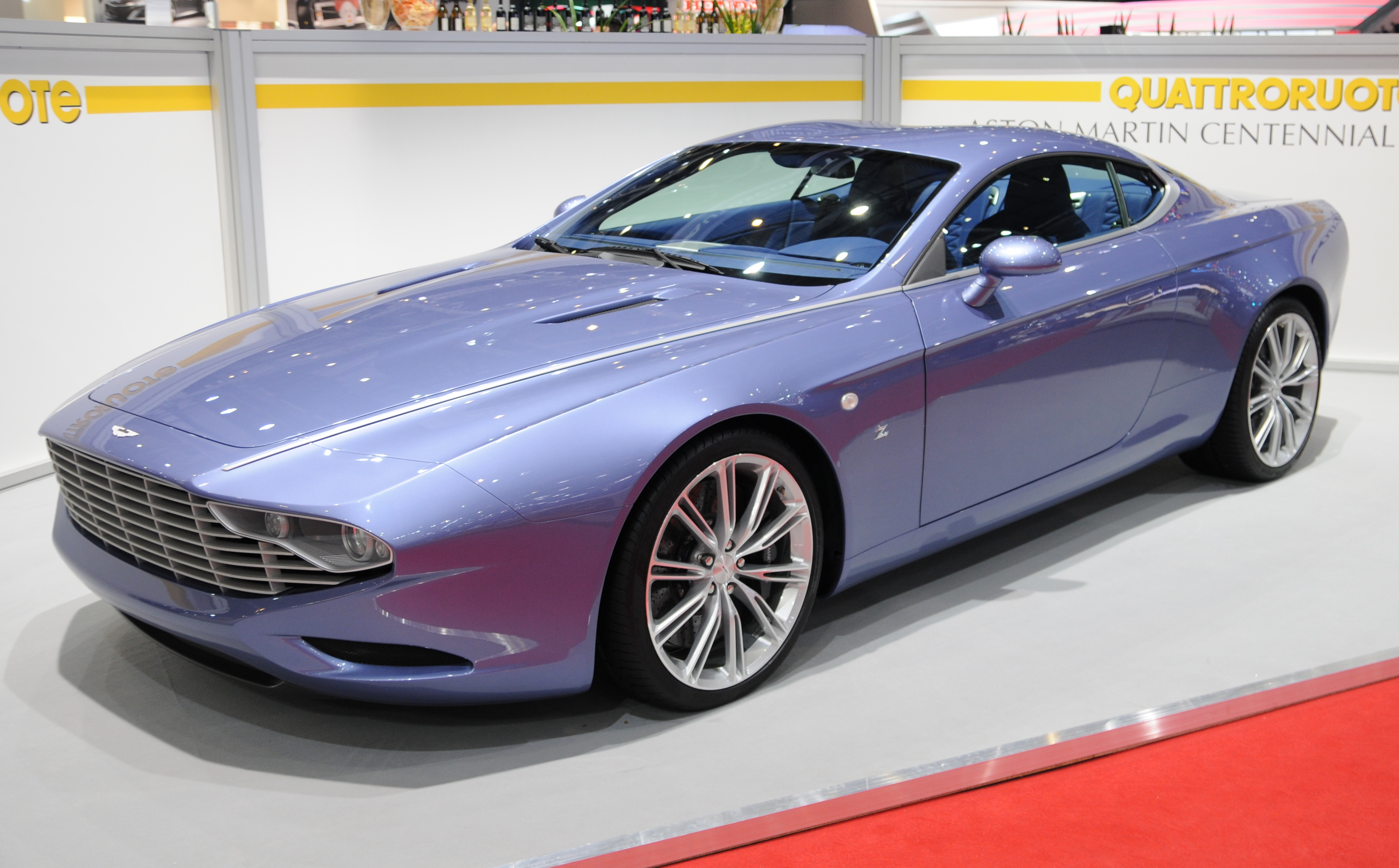
Aston Martin DBS Coupe Zagato Centennial

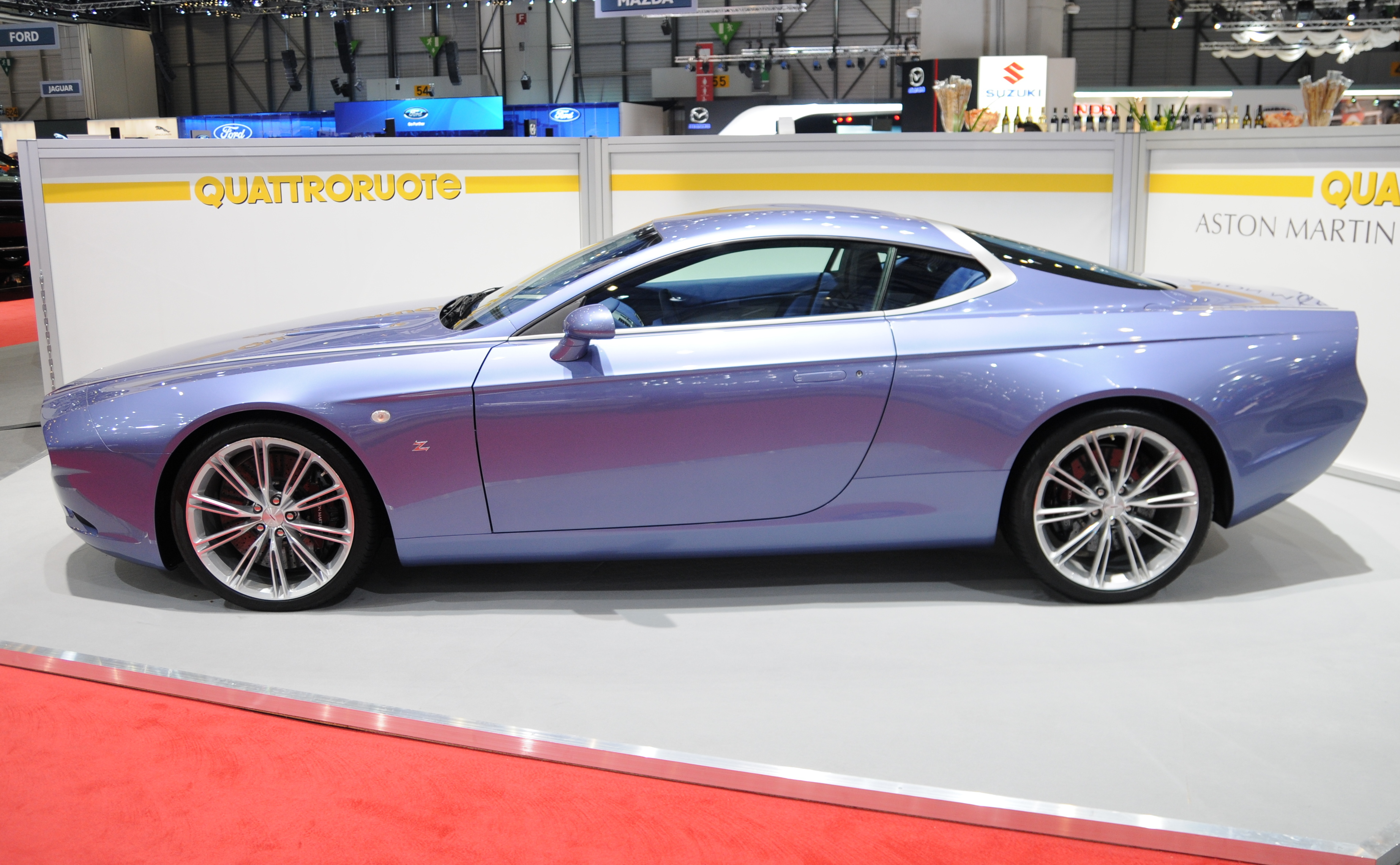

== Specifications ==
=== Overview specifications ===
- Engine: 5,935 cc (362.2 cu in) V12, all-alloy, quad overhead camshaft, 4 valves per cylinder
- Transmission: 6-speed manual (optional 6-speed 'Touchtronic 2' automatic)
- Drivetrain: Front-engine, rear-wheel-drive layout
- Kerb weight: 1,695 kg (3,737 lb)
- City fuel economy: 12 mpg_{‑US} (20 L/100 km; 14 mpg_{‑imp})
- Highway fuel economy: 18 mpg_{‑US} (13 L/100 km; 22 mpg_{‑imp})
- Max. power: 517 PS (380 kW; 510 hp) at 6,500 rpm
- Torque: 570 N⋅m (420 lb⋅ft) at 5,750 rpm
- Fuel capacity: 78 L (20.6 US gal; 17.2 imp gal)
- Wheelbase: 107.9 in (2,741 mm)
- Length: 185.9 in (4,722 mm)
- Width: 81.1 in (2,060 mm)
- Height: 50.4 in (1,280 mm)

=== Transmission ===
The DBS is equipped with a Graziano six-speed manual transaxle (initial 'launch' gearbox) and the optional 'Touchtronic 2' six-speed automatic transmission, based on the same ZF transaxle unit that was developed for the DB9, was introduced in 2008. When fitted with the Touchtronic 2 transmission, the DBS has a heavier kerb weight of 1,765 kg (3,891 lb).

=== Performance ===
The DBS is equipped with the 5.9-litre, 60° AM08 V12 with four valves per cylinder. The same basic engine is also used in the DBR9 and DBRS9 racing cars albeit with extensive modifications. The engine of the DBS has a power output of 517 PS (380 kW; 510 hp) at 6,500 rpm and 570 N⋅m (420 lb⋅ft) of torque at 5,750 rpm with a compression ratio of 10.9:1. The engine also includes an active bypass valve which above 5,500 rpm opens and lets more air into the engine resulting in increased performance and propels the car from 0 to 100 km/h (62 mph) in 4.3 seconds and has a maximum speed of 307 km/h (191 mph). In 2007, the British motoring show Top Gear tested the DBS around their Top Gear test track with a lap time of 1:23.9; 3.2 seconds faster than its predecessor, the Vanquish S and a second faster than the comparable Bentley Continental Supersports.

=== Handling ===
The DBS uses the Aston Martin VH platform. Due to the structure, 85% of the weight of the car is kept between the wheels, which results in improved handling, responsiveness and feel during tight cornering.

Aston Martin has also developed an Adaptive Damping System, or ADS, which, when turned on, automatically alters the suspension settings in order for the car to cope with the driver's desired driving mode according to the road/weather conditions. Apart from the suspension getting stiffer, throttle and braking response is increased and steering is sharpened.

The DBS was fitted with Pirelli P-Zero tyres developed especially for the car, along with lightweight aluminium 20-inch wheels.

To reduce weight, Aston Martin made extensive use of carbon fibre throughout the car. The bonnet, the boot, the front wings, the door opening surrounds and the boot compartment are all made of carbon fibre. The carpets are also made by special thin layers made from carbon fibre. The roof and the doors are made of aluminium. The result is a 30 kg (66 lb) weight reduction as compared to the DB9. The car is also fitted with a carbon fibre splitter at the front wings to increase handling and a carbon fibre rear diffuser to increase high-speed stability.

The brake discs are carbon ceramic, which reduces a significant 12.5 kg (28 lb) from the unsprung weight. At the front, there are 398 mm (15.7 in) ventilated and drilled brakes with 6-piston alloy monobloc calipers. At the back, there are 360 mm (14.2 in) ventilated and drilled brakes with 4-piston alloy monobloc calipers.

=== Interior ===
The interior of the DBS uses a blend of carbon fibre, Alcantara, leather, wood, stainless steel and aluminium surfaces, depending on the buyer's specified options. The door panels are capped with carbon fibre or leather, and utilise carbon fibre door pulls. The fascia is, as standard, matrix alloy and iridium silver centre console or, as an optional extra, piano black fascia and centre console. To achieve even greater weight savings, the carpet has a special lightweight carbon weave. The car is started by means of the "Emotion Control Unit", which was initially developed especially for the DBS but became available for the DB9 and the V8 Vantage as well. The key is made from stainless steel and glass and is inserted into a special slot in the dashboard.

== Film appearances ==
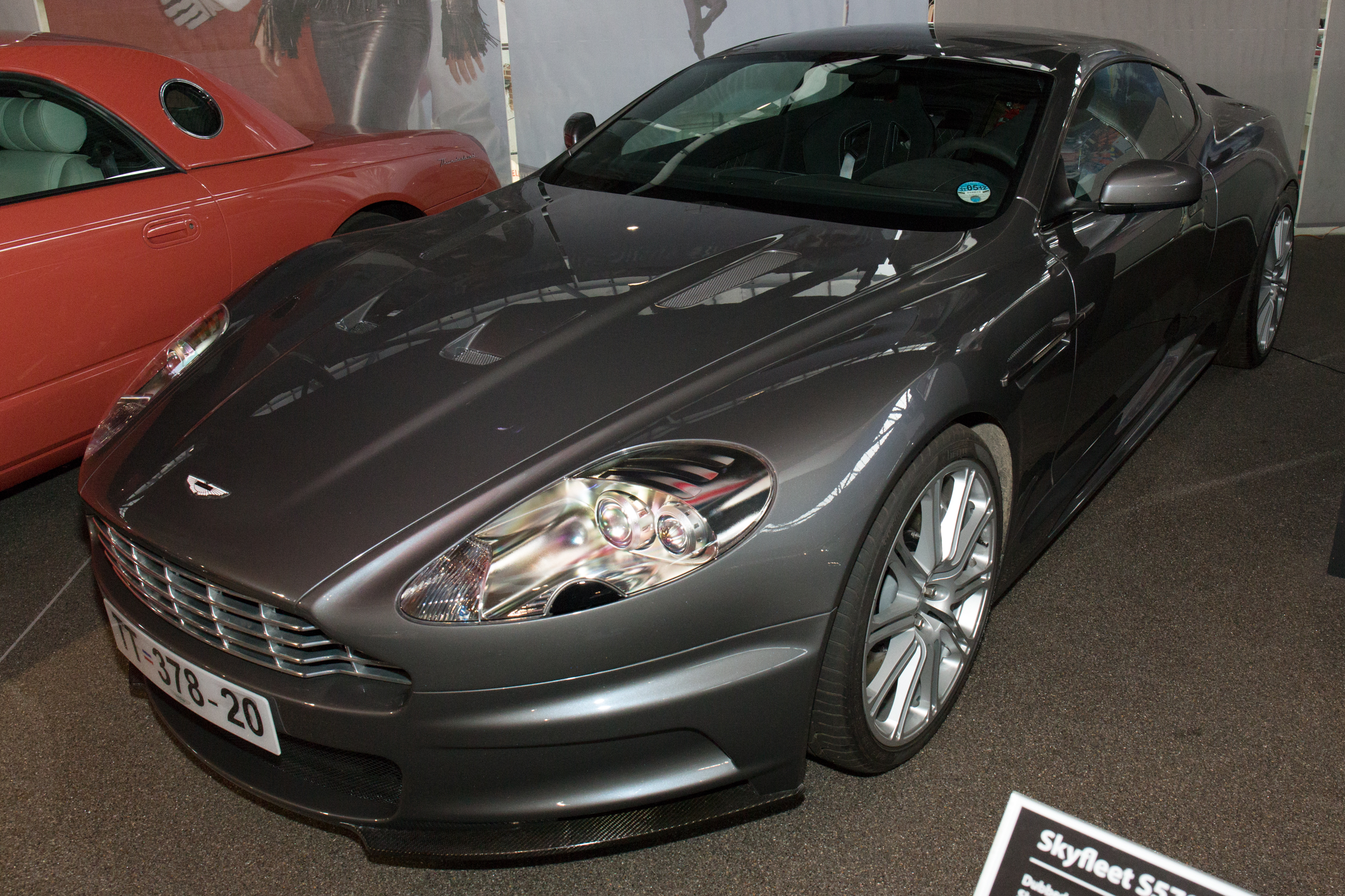
One of the Aston Martin DBSs used in the James Bond film Casino Royale

The DBS was first seen in the 2006 James Bond film Casino Royale, the first film in which Bond was played by Daniel Craig, as a result of Eon Production's desire to tie the new Bond actor to the franchise heritage with Aston Martin. The only in-car gadget featured in the film is a glovebox/safe that contains a spare pistol, silencer, and a medical kit with a defibrillator in its compartment. Bond uses the car to go to Casino Royale in Montenegro so he can find Le Chiffre. The car is later destroyed when James Bond swerves to avoid hitting Vesper, who had been used as a bait by Le Chiffre to lure Bond after being kidnapped. The cars used in the production were actually prototypes, based on DB9 test vehicles, as the film was produced well before the DBS entered production.

The DBS returned for the pre-credits car chase around Lake Garda in the 2008 Bond film Quantum of Solace. The vehicle is colored a dark metallic dark grey, referred to as "Quantum Silver" in Aston Martin's options list. In the film, Bond uses the vehicle to deliver Mr. White to M while trying to avoid his pursuers, but is later damaged as a result. The cars used in the film are 2009 model year, German-market spec DBS production vehicles.

== Naming confusion ==
Some confusion over the name of the production version occurred when some test mules running around the Nürburgring were given DBRS9 badges. However, it would seem that this was only a trick played by the company to confuse spy photographers. The official name of the vehicle was declared to be DBS.

== Production ==
The DBS was built in Gaydon, Warwickshire. Its engine was built at the Aston Martin engine plant in Cologne, Germany.

Production totalled 3,381 units, comprising 2,536 coupes and 845 Volante versions.
