= European Automotive Design =

European Automotive Design was a British magazine, which was closed in January 2009 because the publishing company behind it—Findlay Publications Ltd—was taken into administration by its major shareholder, Robert Findlay. When he re-invented the company as Findlay Media Ltd, he 'left behind' European Automotive Design and its sister publications (European Truck & Bus Technology and Automotive Design Asia) along with its founding editor and publisher.
