= Virage =

Virage may refer to:

- The Aston Martin Virage;
- The Renault 12, which was rebranded "Virage" in Australia;
- Virage, a creature in the Legend of Dragoon game.
