= Aston Martin Virage =

Series of luxury cars by Aston Martin

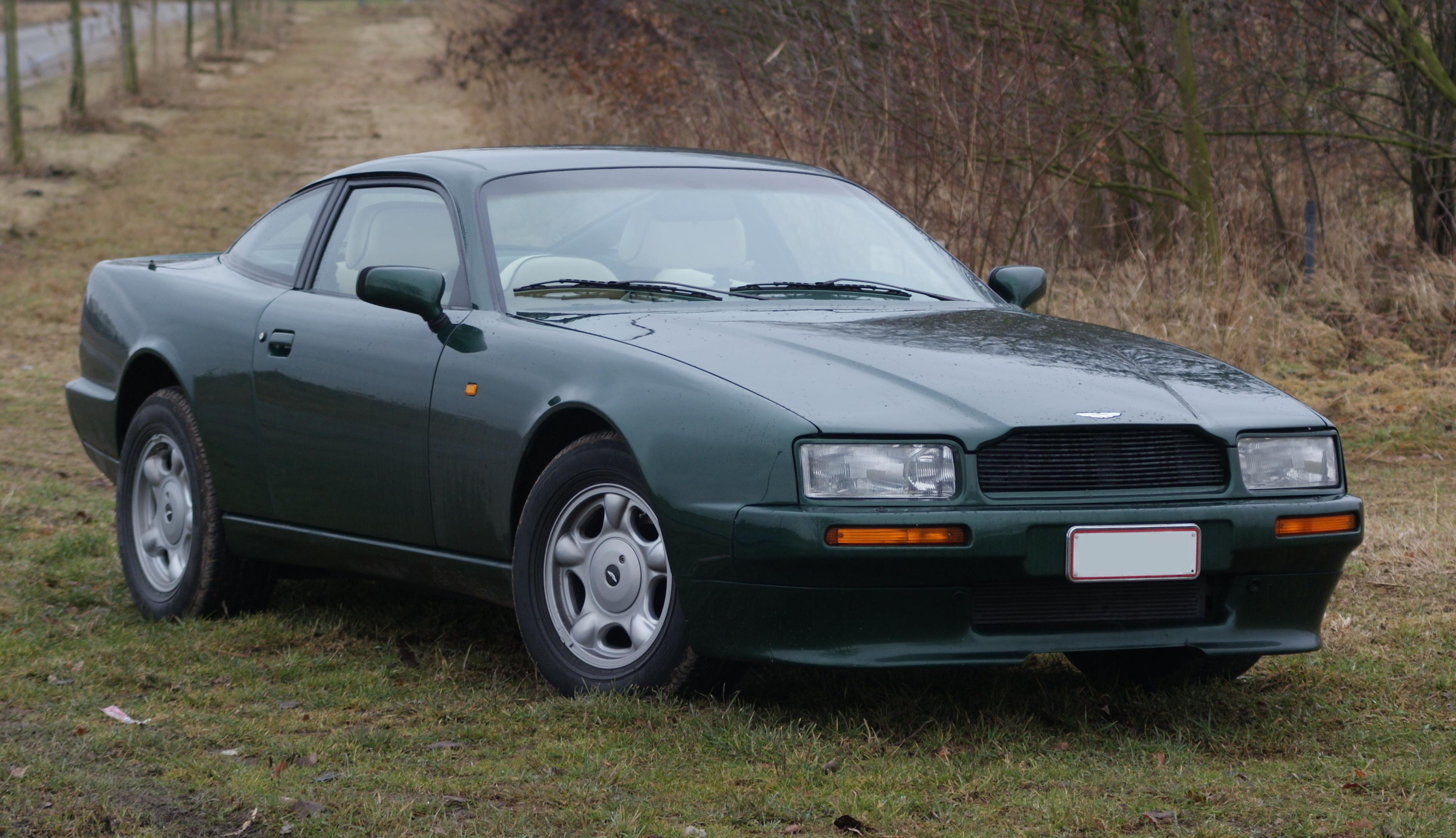
- 1991 Aston Martin Virage

Overview
- Manufacturer: Aston Martin Lagonda Limited
- Production: 1989–2000; 2011–2012

Body and chassis
- Class: Grand Tourer (S)

Powertrain
- Engine: 5.3 L V8

Chronology
- Predecessor: Aston Martin V8 Vantage (1977)
- Successor: Aston Martin Vanquish; Aston Martin Vantage (2005)

The Aston Martin Virage is an automobile produced by British luxury automobile manufacturer Aston Martin as a replacement for its V8 models. Introduced at the Birmingham Motor Show in 1988, it was joined by the high-performance Vantage in 1993, after which the name of the base model was changed to V8 Coupé in 1996.

The V8-powered model was intended as the company's flagship model, with the 6-cylinder DB7, introduced in 1994, positioned below it as an entry-level model. Although the DB7 became available with a V12 engine and claimed a performance advantage, the Virage remained the exclusive, expensive and hand-built flagship of the Aston Martin range.

The Virage was replaced in 2000 with the Vanquish. By the end of the 2000 model year, 1,050 cars in total had been produced.

A new Virage model was introduced at the 2011 Geneva Motor Show, to fit into the middle of Aston Martin's then current lineup but was discontinued in 2012 due to many similarities between the brand's other models.

== Virage (1989–2000) ==
=== Virage/V8 Coupe and Works Service models ===
Virage
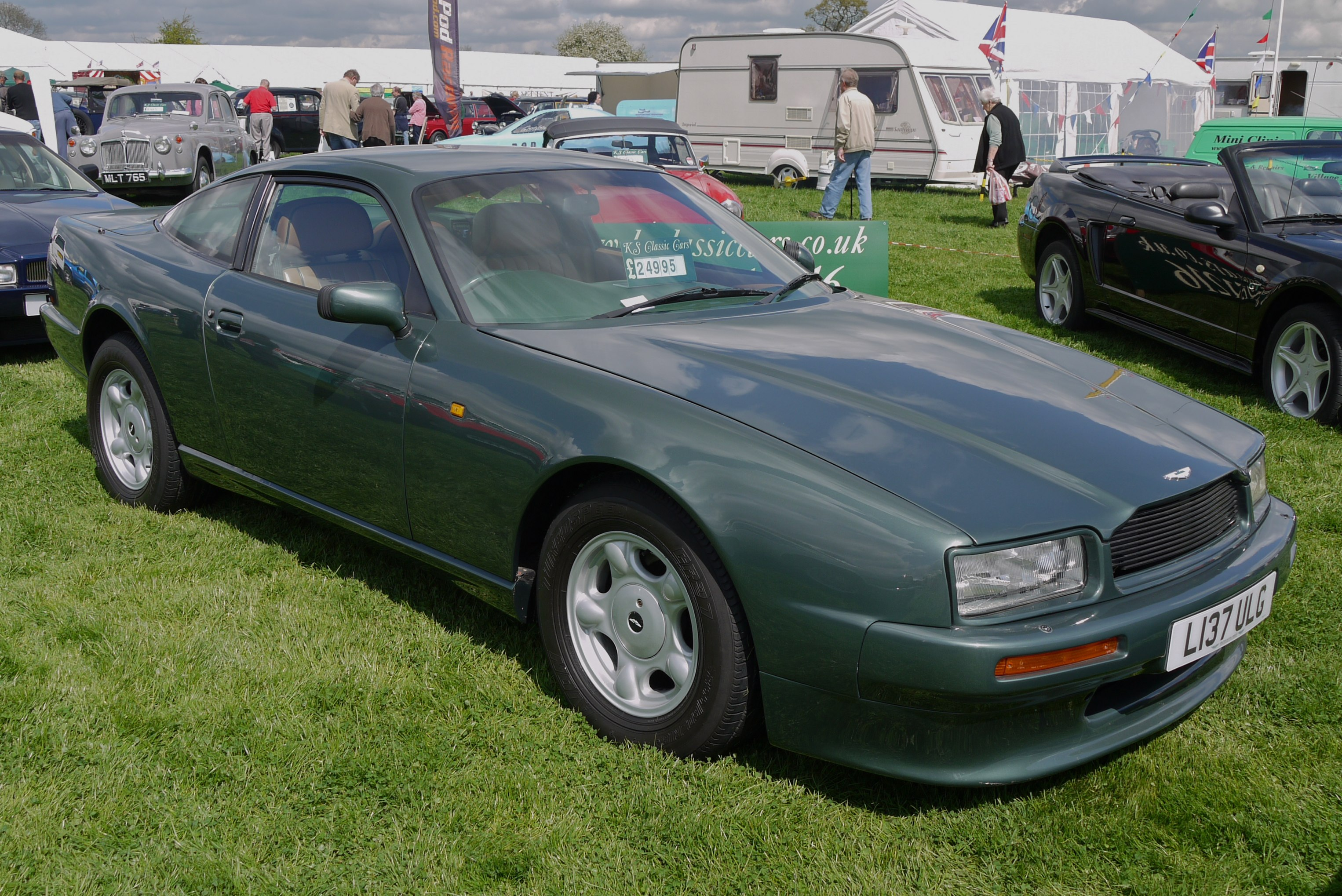

Overview
- Production: 1989–1996 (Virage Coupe); 411 produced; 1996–2000 (V8 Coupe); 101 produced
- Assembly: United Kingdom: Newport Pagnell, Buckinghamshire
- Designer: John Heffernan, Ken Greenley

Body and chassis
- Body style: 2-door 2+2 coupé
- Layout: Front-engine, rear-wheel-drive

Powertrain
- Engine: 5.3 L Aston Martin V8; 6.3 L Aston Martin V8
- Transmission: 5-/6-speed ZF manual; 3-/4-speed TorqueFlite automatic

Dimensions
- Wheelbase: 2,610 mm (102.8 in)
- Length: 4,735 mm (186.4 in)
- Width: 1,855 mm (73.0 in)
- Kerb weight: 1,790 kg (3,946 lb)

When compared to the preceding V8, the design was more modern. The chassis was an evolution of the Lagonda's, with a de Dion tube rear suspension, located by triangulated radius rods and a Watts linkage, and a double wishbone unit at the front. To cut costs, many of the less-important pieces came from other companies, as had been the case for Aston Martin automobiles of the past. The headlights and taillights were sourced from the Audi 200 and the Volkswagen Scirocco respectively, while General Motors, Jaguar, Citroën and Ford provided the steering column, climate control panel, wing mirrors and dash switches. In fact, Ford had purchased Aston Martin and Jaguar shortly before the Virage debuted and it became the first model to be introduced under the new ownership.

The Virage was a large, heavy car in spite of its all-aluminium body, but the 32-valve 5.3 L (5,340 cc) V8 engine's 494 N⋅m (364 lb⋅ft) of torque elevated its performance to near sports car levels. "Acceleration just never seems to run out", claimed Sports Car International during a first test. They also praised the "eager and quicker revving" nature of the 330 hp (246 kW; 335 PS) engine with its Callaway-designed heads and Weber-Marelli fuel injection. "Nothing sounds quite like an Aston V8," they concluded. The 1,790 kg (3,946 lb) car could reach a top-speed of 254 km/h (158 mph). The automatic variant could accelerate to 97 km/h (60 mph) from a standing start in a claimed 6.5 seconds (7.4 seconds for the manual version). The catalyzed European-spec engine produces a claimed 310 PS (228 kW) at 5300 rpm, and period tests claimed 8 seconds to reach 100 km/h (62 mph) for the automatic version. An engine power upgrade to 350 hp (261 kW; 355 PS) was announced at the 1996 Geneva Motor Show. English actor Rowan Atkinson owned Virage Coupé chassis 50010, which featured on the front cover of Car May 1990. In the article he commented how the modern climate control system provided heating efficiency beyond the veteran Aston Martin driver's dreams and could not believe warm air would emanate from the footwell within 90 seconds of start up. This car also appeared in the beginning of his 1991 TV series The Driven Man. Other celebrity owners included Lennox Lewis, Elton John and Chris Eubank.

The five-speed ZF Friedrichshafen manual was fitted to about forty percent of the cars produced. The more popular automatic option was the Chrysler three-speed Torqueflite transmission. For the 1993 model year, the three-speed unit was replaced by a four-speed automatic unit. The six-speed manual from the Vantage also became optional at the end of the Virage's production run. Aston Martin had prepared for an annual production rate of 275 examples. In the end, the totals averaged about a third of that during the model's seven-year lifespan (including the Volante).

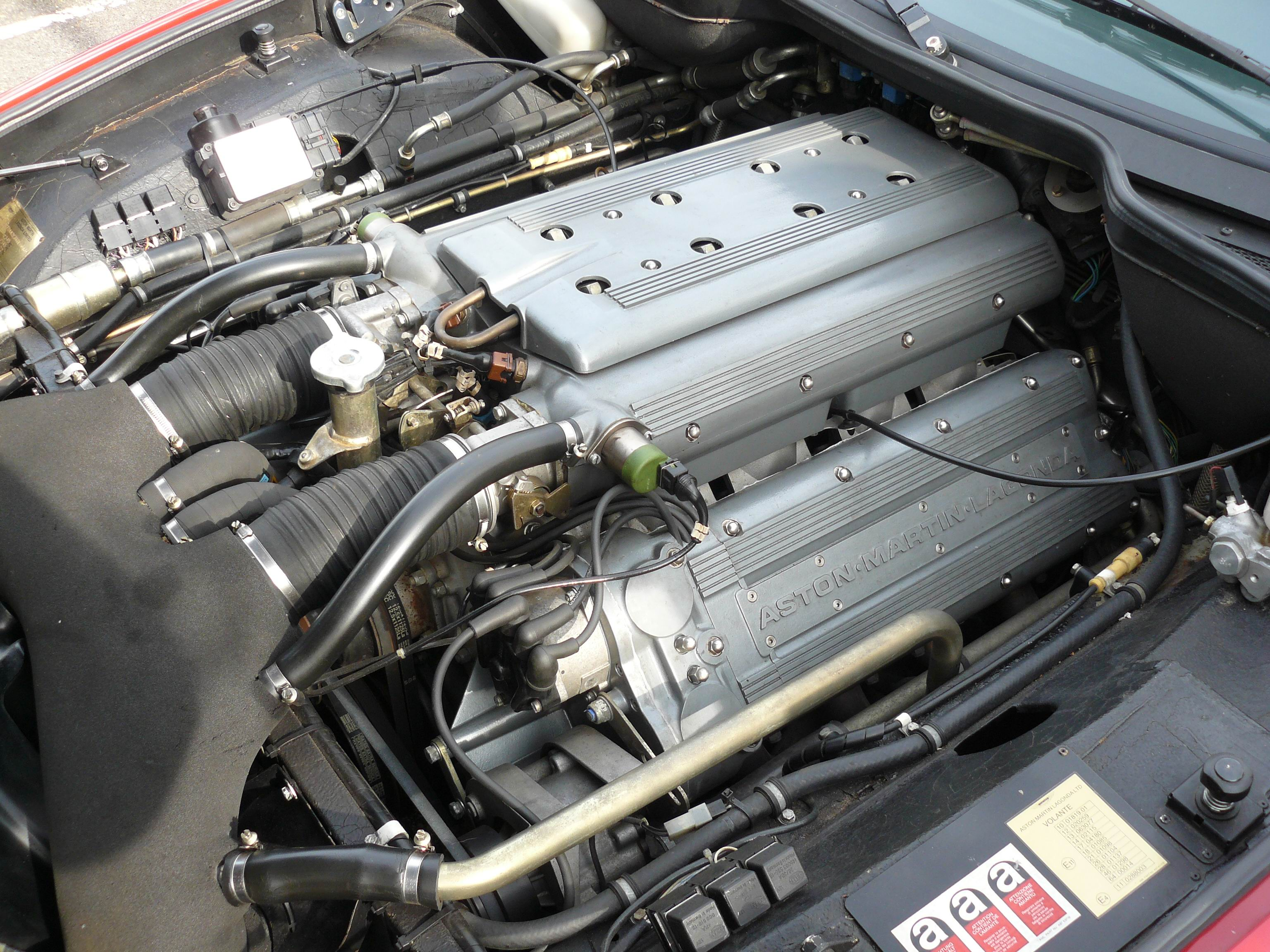
Aston Martin Virage engine bay

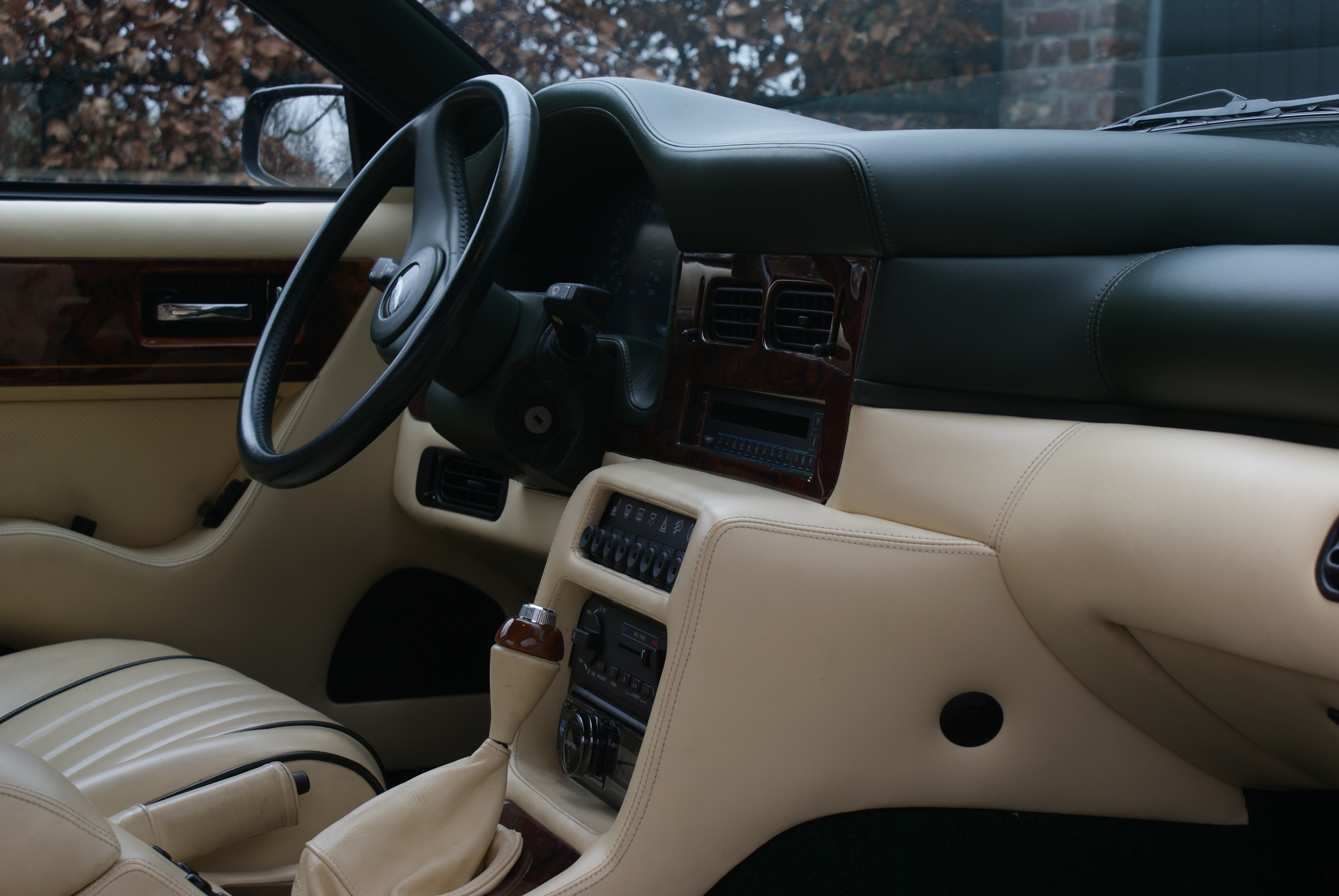
Interior

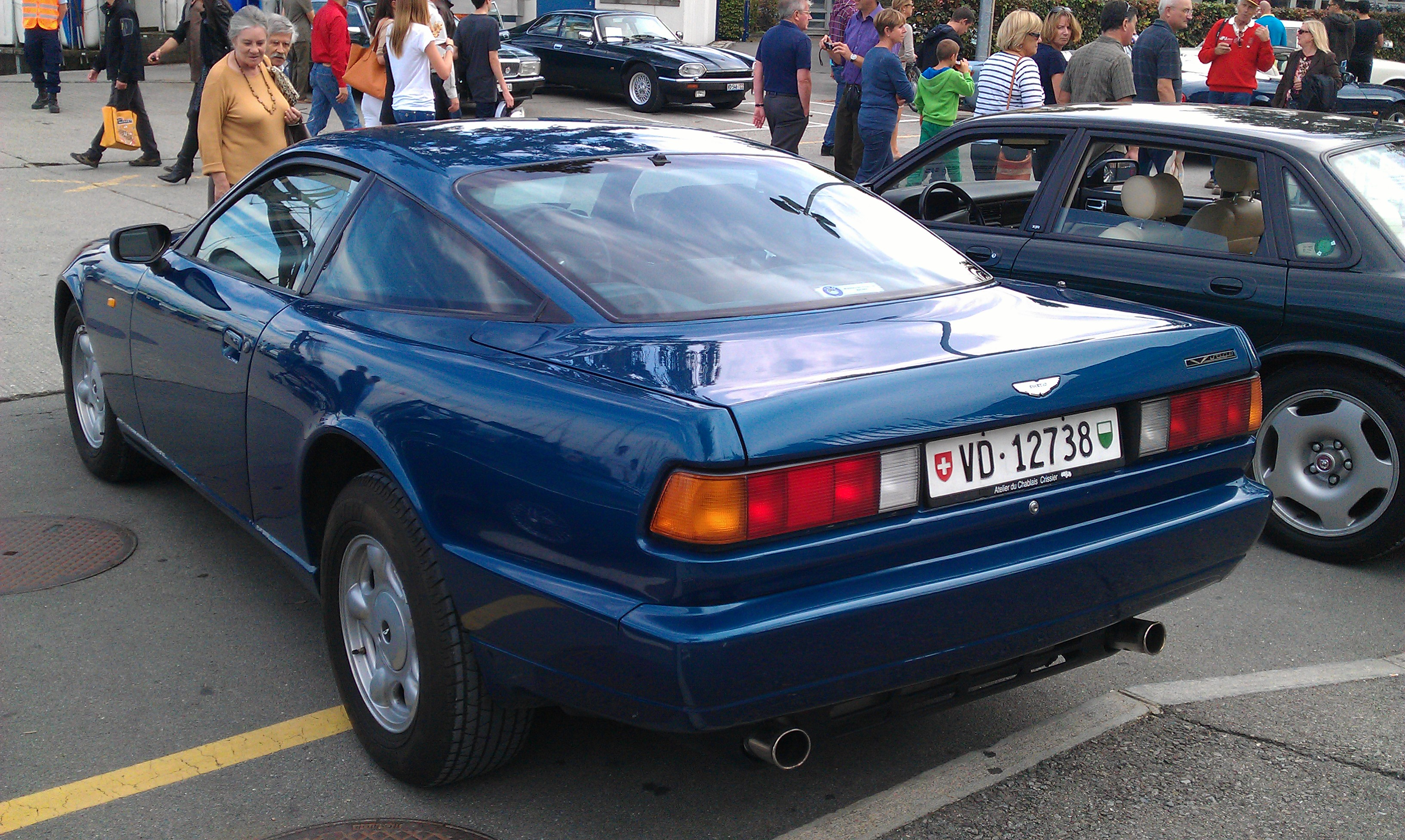
Rear 3/4 view

==== Works Service ====
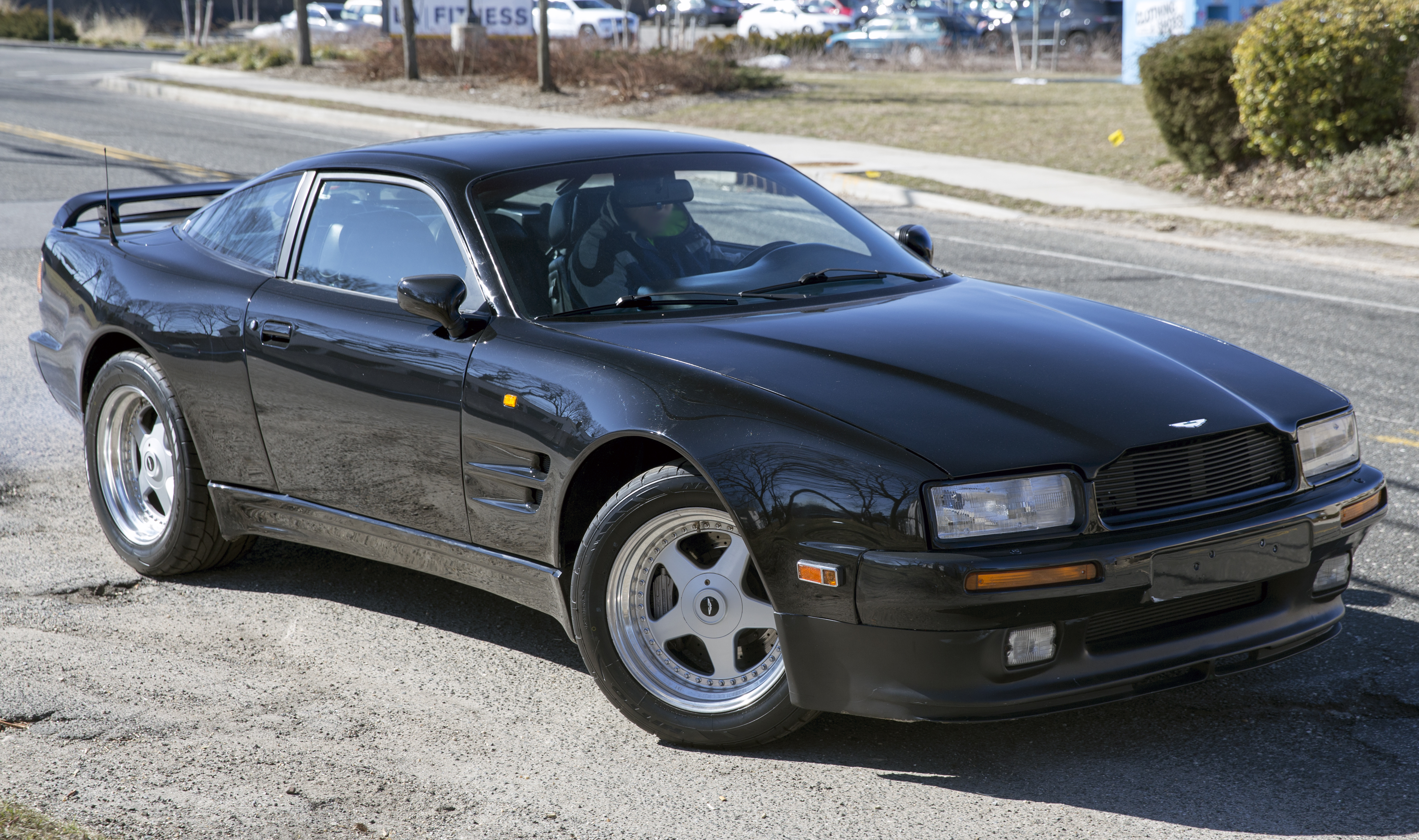
Aston Martin Virage 6.3 Widebody (Works Service)

In January 1992, Aston Martin introduced a conversion service, upgrading the car into a Virage 6.3. As the name implies, the centerpiece of the conversion was a bored and stroked 6.3 L (6,347 cc) V8 derived from the AMR1 racing car. This engine has a power output of between 456 and 500 hp (340 and 373 kW; 462 and 507 PS) at 6,000 rpm and 480 lb⋅ft (651 N⋅m) of torque at 5,800 rpm, allowing the car to attain a top speed of 175 mph (282 km/h).

Other changes included 14-inch (356 mm) ventilated disc brakes, the largest used in a passenger car until the Bentley Continental GT, and 18 inch wheels. Visually, the 6.3 had wide flared bumpers, low sills and air dams, and side air vents.

Virage Shooting Brake

A shooting brake (estate) version of the Virage was offered in limited numbers. It debuted at the March 1992 Geneva Motor Show. Unlike prior Aston Martin Shooting Brake models, however, the Virage was produced in-house by the company's Works Service, with six believed to be constructed in total. The cars were priced at £165,000. The cars are believed to have retained Virage chassis numbers, except two that received chassis numbers of the type "DP/2099".

Lagonda Virage Saloon

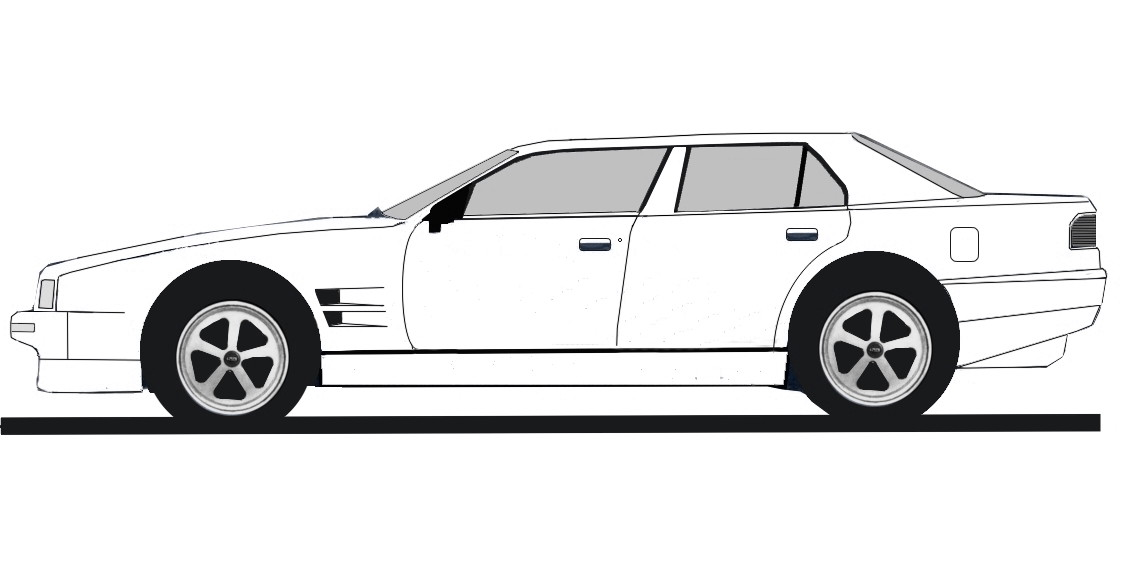
A sketch showing the side profile of the Lagonda Virage saloon

The Lagonda Saloon is a long-wheelbase four-door Virage model that was built in very limited numbers to customer orders, reviving Aston Martin's long-dormant second marque. Introduced in 1994, it was manufactured by Aston Martin Works Service with a 12 in (305 mm) chassis extension, although two were ordered with an 18 in (457 mm) extension. The name refers to the four-door Aston Martin Lagonda. The Lagonda Virage cost about £250,000 and only eight or nine are believed to have been produced, with some being conversions of regular Virages. Six of these cars were ordered by the royal family of Brunei.

Lagonda Virage Shooting Brake

The five-door Lagonda Virage Shooting Brake debuted at the same time as the Lagonda Virage. It was made by Aston Martin Works Service in only one or two examples, and has been spotted bearing "Vacances" badging at the rear. A further six cars were made for a royal family from the ground up, adding a 406.4 mm (16 in) extension to the chassis of a standard Virage.

==== V8 Coupe ====
A less extreme (compared to the Vantage) V8 Coupe replaced the standard Virage from 1996 onwards having the updated styling inherited from the more powerful Vantage. Lacking the superchargers and the more aggressive body style of its sibling, the engine in the V8 Coupe has a power output of 350 hp (261 kW; 355 PS) and 369 lb·ft (500 N·m) of torque. In total, 101 examples of the V8 Coupe were built from 1996 through 2000.

V8 Sportsman Estate

The V8 was also subject to coachbuilt conversion by Aston Martin's Works Service department. Dubbed the Sportsman estate, only three were made using existing V8 Coupes as a base. No mechanical modifications were made and the Estate retained the V8 Coupe's engine and mechanicals.

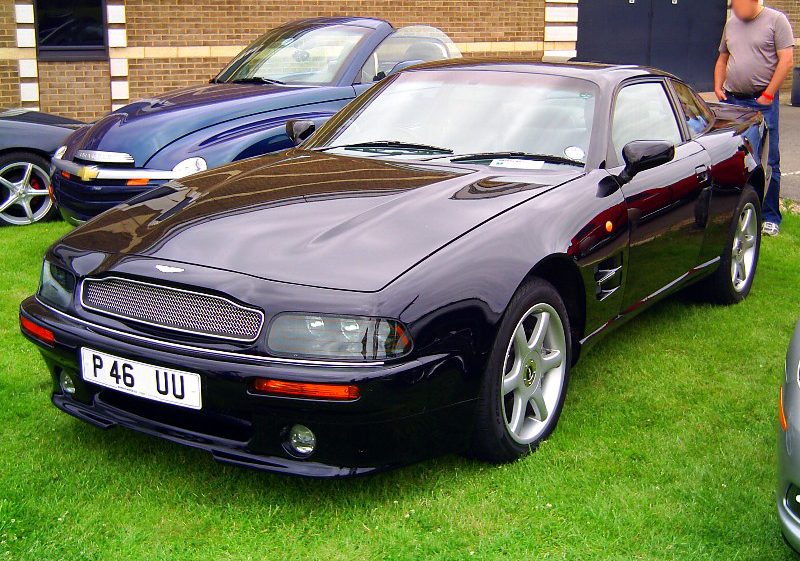
Aston Martin V8 Coupe

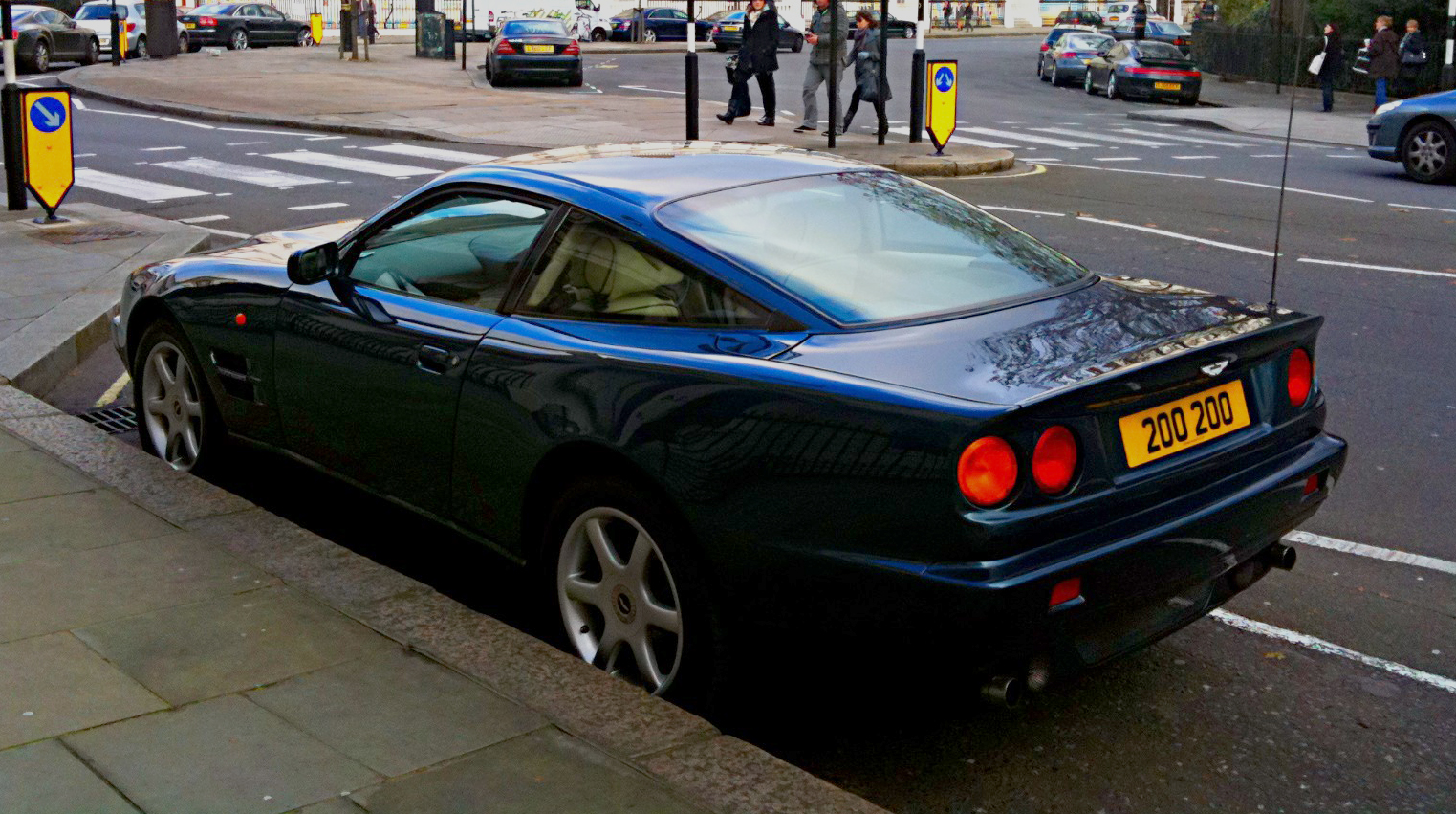
rear 3/4 view

=== Virage Volante/V8 Volante ===
Virage/V8 Volante
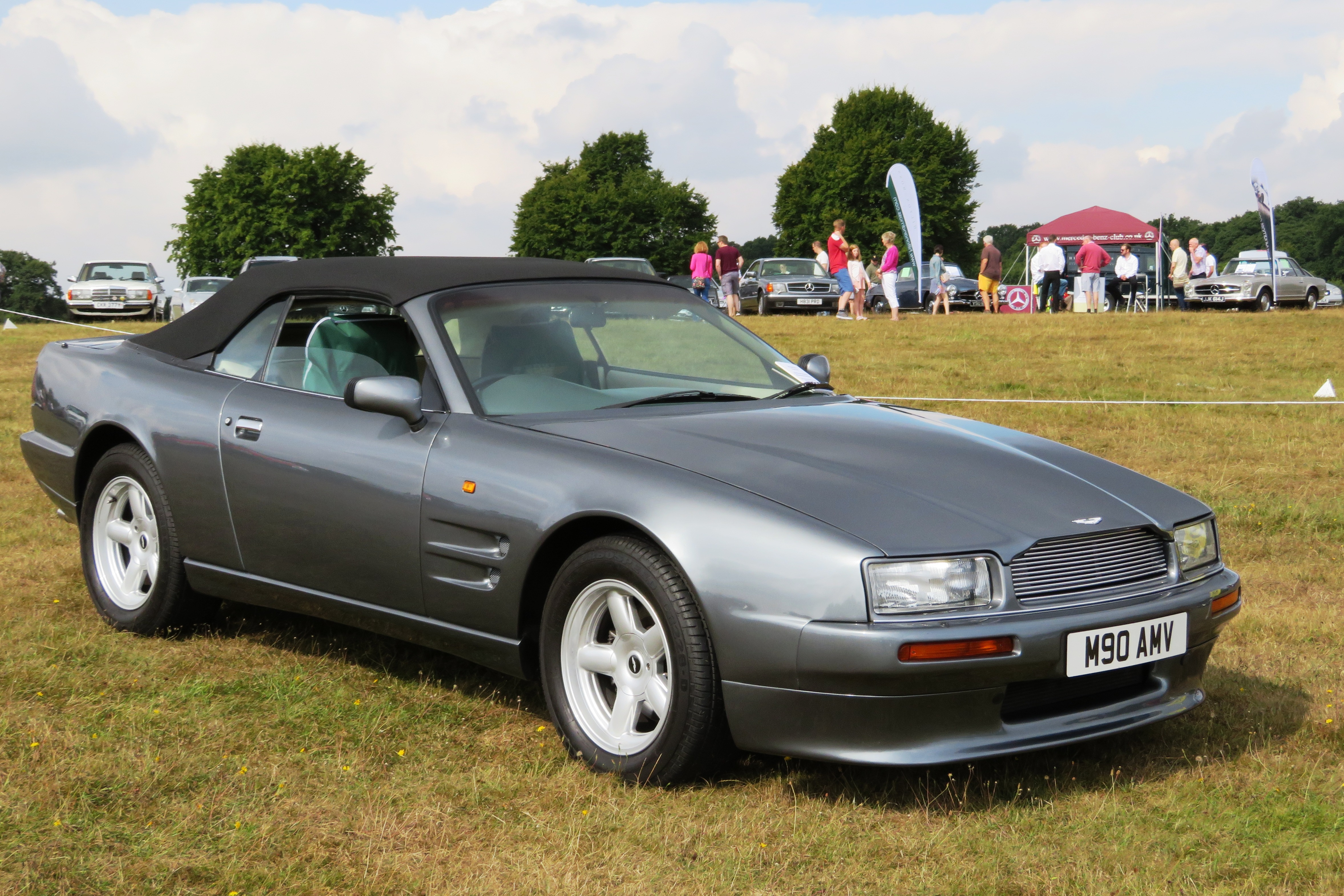

Overview
- Production: 1992–1996 (Virage Volante); 224 or 233 produced; 1997–2000 (V8 Volante); 63 produced
- Assembly: United Kingdom: Newport Pagnell, Buckinghamshire
- Designer: John Heffernan, Ken Greenley

Body and chassis
- Body style: 2-door convertible; 2-door 2+2 convertible
- Layout: Front-engine, rear-wheel-drive

Powertrain
- Engine: 5.3 L V8
- Transmission: 6-speed ZF manual; 4-speed Torqueflite automatic

Dimensions
- Wheelbase: 2,610 mm (102.8 in); 2,810 mm (110.6 in) (LWB)

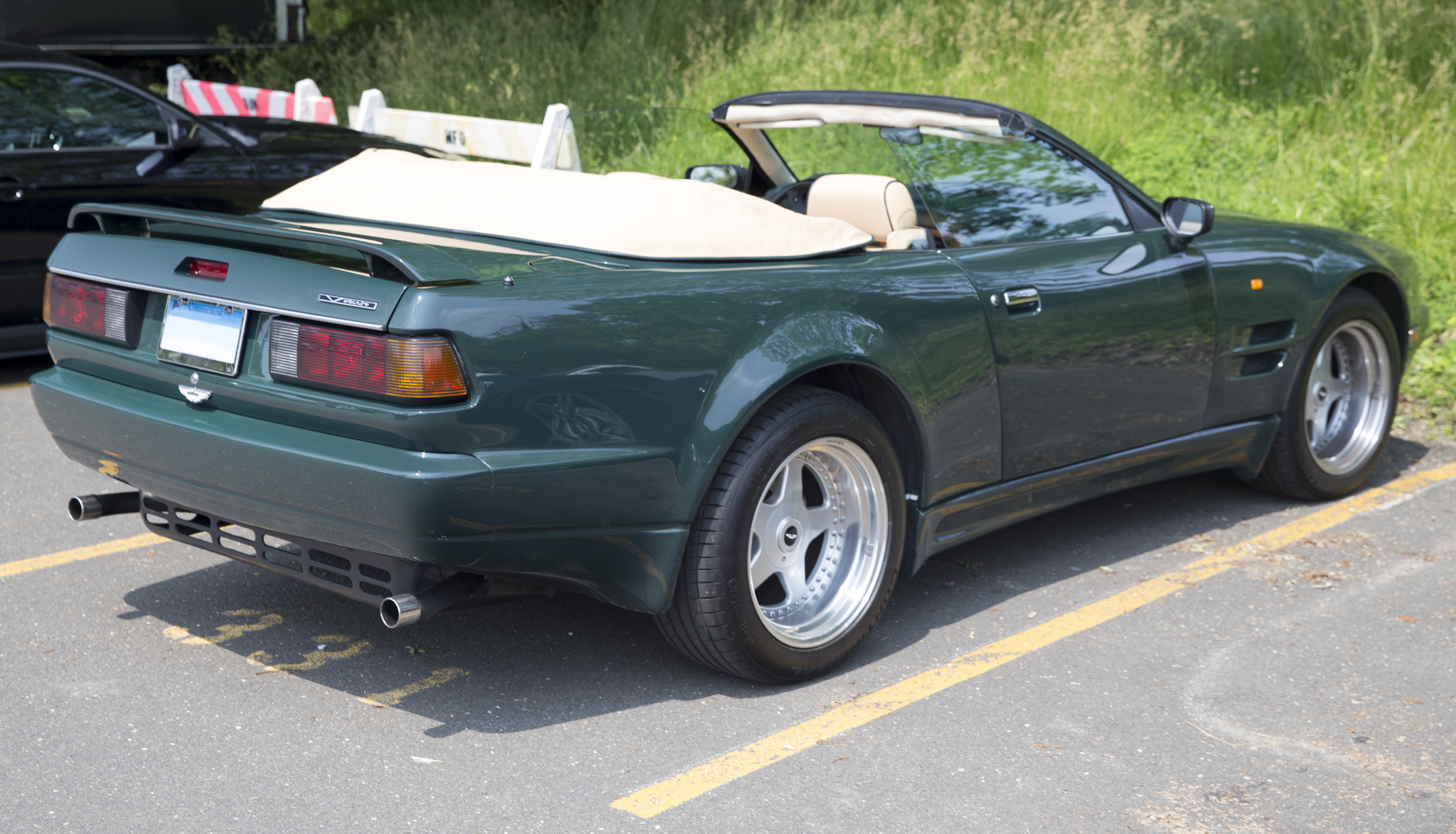
1993 Aston Martin Virage Volante Widebody, rear view

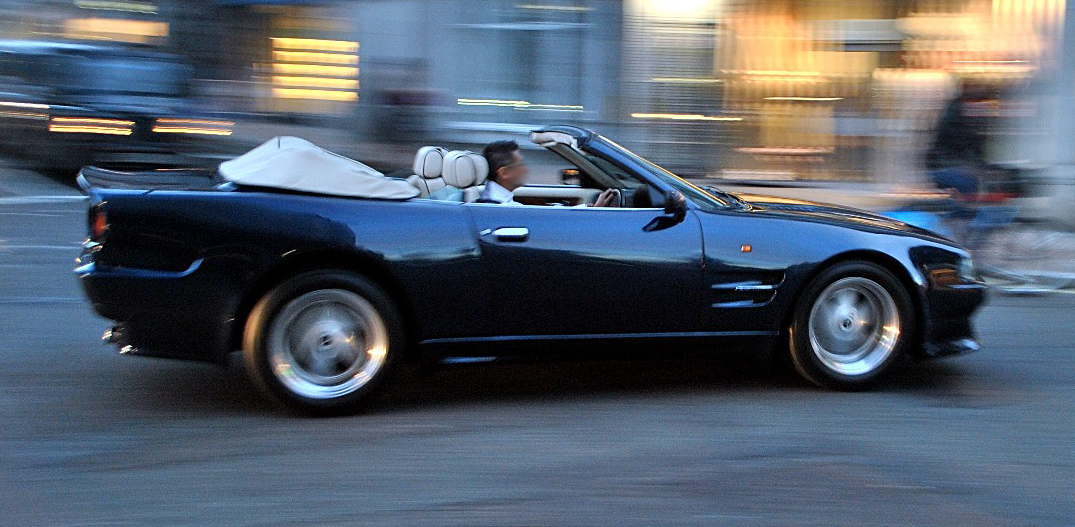
Aston Martin V8 Volante Long Wheelbase

The convertible version of the Virage, called the Virage Volante debuted at the 1990 Birmingham Motor Show as a strict two-seater, but a 2+2 version was shown at the 1991 Geneva Motor Show. Production examples, first appearing in 1992, were all to feature 2+2 seating. Sources state that either 224 or 233 examples had been produced when production ended in 1996. The last 11 examples already had the naturally aspirated 1995 version of the engine found in the later V8 and V8 LWB Volante models with the improved four-speed and overdrive Torqueflite automatic and a power output of 359 PS (264 kW; 354 hp), which may be part of why there is some disagreement to the production numbers.

1992 was also when Aston Martin introduced its 6.3-litre "Works Service" package, which included wider fenders to accommodate the larger OZ wheels and 14-inch disc brakes, additional vents, deeper sills, and other appearance modifications. This was immediately available on the Coupé as well as the Volante. Aston Martin soon introduced a strictly cosmetic version called the Wide Body featuring the regular 5.3-litre engine; this was mainly intended for the United States market as the 6.3 was not certified for sale there. 13 of these were built for the United States, whereas only seven regular Virage Volantes were delivered there. In contrast to the Wide Body Volante, the Prince of Wales chose to equip his 1994 Volante with the standard bodywork coupled with the 456 hp (340 kW; 462 PS) 6.3-litre engine and a manual transmission.

A new V8 Volante Long Wheelbase, with updated styling of the V8 Coupe was produced from 1997 to 2000 on a chassis lengthened by 200 mm (7.9 in). Only 63 units were built by the time production came to a halt.

Following on their V8 Volante junior car, Aston Martin built a half-scale junior car version of the Virage Volante as well. It received a handmade aluminium body, leather interior, and a 160-cc Honda engine; this children's car cost as much as a brand new Mercedes-Benz 190E. Ten examples were built in total.

=== Vantage ===
Vantage/Le Mans
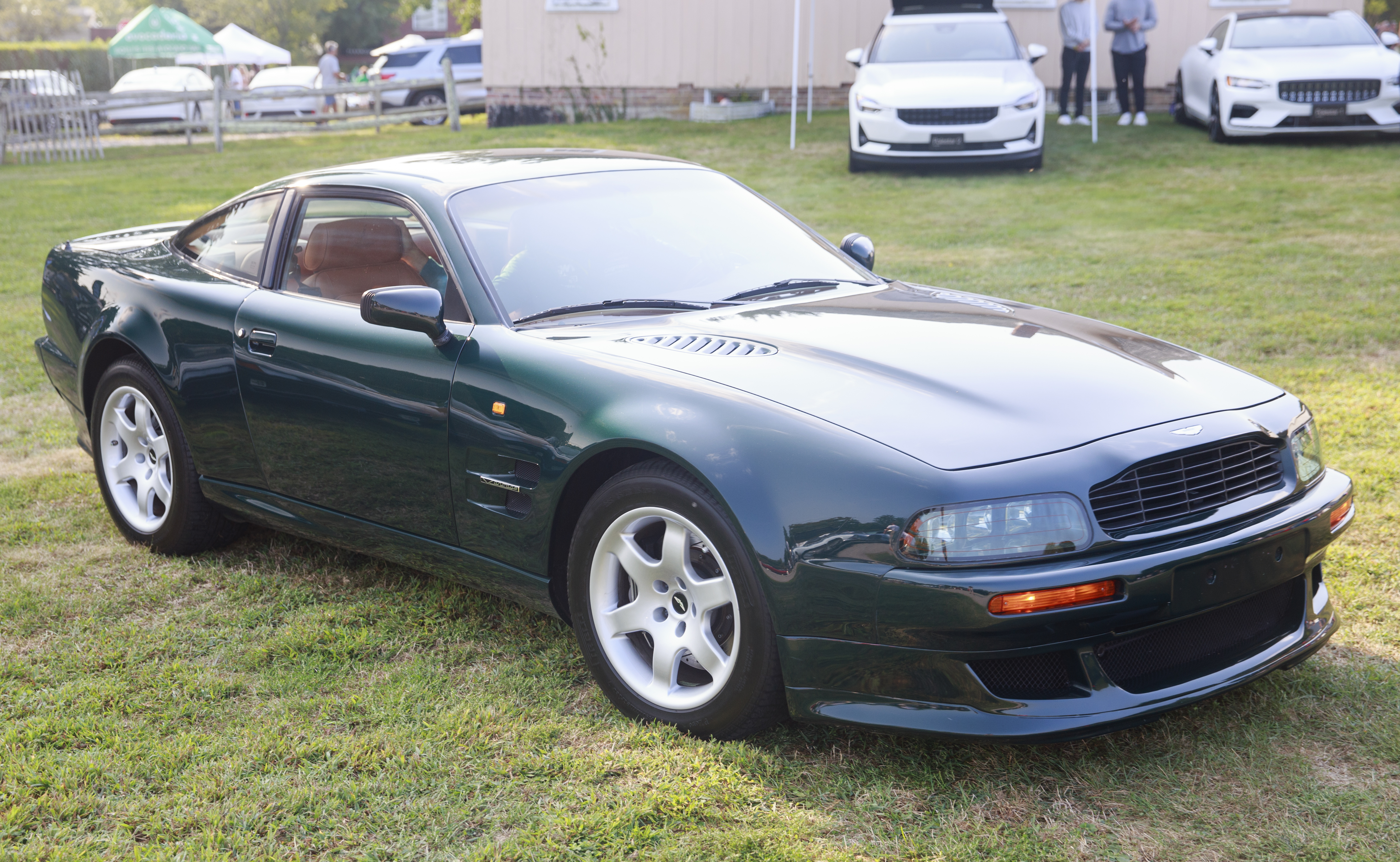
- Aston Martin Vantage V550

Overview
- Production: 1993–2000; Vantage: (280 produced); Volante: (8 SWB, 1 LWB)
- Assembly: United Kingdom: Newport Pagnell, Buckinghamshire
- Designer: John Heffernan

Body and chassis
- Body style: 2-door 2+2 coupé; 2-door 2+2 convertible
- Layout: Front-engine, rear-wheel-drive

Powertrain
- Engine: 5.3 L twin-supercharged V8
- Transmission: 6-speed ZF manual

As with many other Aston Martin models, a high-performance Vantage model of the Virage would later be introduced. First shown at Birmingham in September 1992, the Vantage was produced from 1993 through 2000. The Virage name lasted just a few years, with its final descendants inheriting the simple and familiar V8 name.

The Vantage had new styling, with only the roof, doors and wing mirrors shared with the Virage. The wing mirrors were later replaced in favour of the ones from the Jaguar XK8/XKR. Compared to the Virage, the Vantage is wider, lower, used four round tail lights (later adopted for the base V8 Coupe), and featured new rear suspension and interior electronics. Like the 6.3, the Vantage used 362 mm (14 in) brake discs and 18 inch wheels.

The biggest change to the Vantage was inside the engine compartment. The 5.3 L (5,341 cc) V8 engine now used twin superchargers. Power output was now 550 hp (410 kW; 558 PS), and the torque was 555 lb⋅ft (752 N⋅m) at 4,000 rpm. Top speed was 300 km/h (186 mph), with acceleration from 0–60 mph (97 km/h) taking 4.6 seconds. Customers cars could be returned to Works Service starting in 1998 to be converted to V600 specifications, where the engine was upgraded to 600 hp (447 kW; 608 PS) at 6,200 rpm and 600 lb⋅ft (813 N⋅m) of torque at 4,400 rpm.

In 2000, Aston Martin's Works Service unit also built nine bespoke Vantage Volante "Special Edition" models (convertibles). These were on the shorter wheelbase except one single example which was built to long wheelbase specifications.

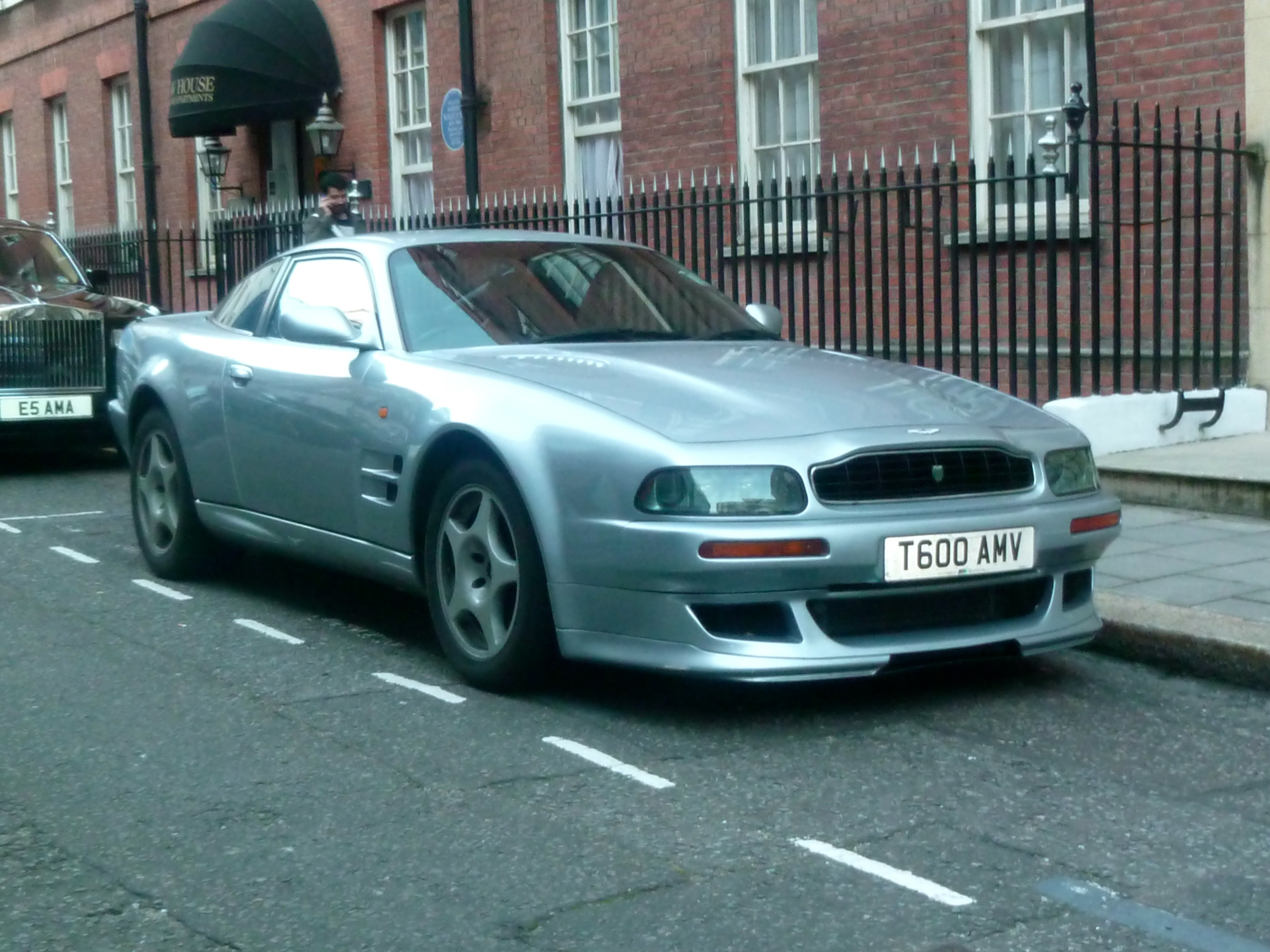
Vantage V600

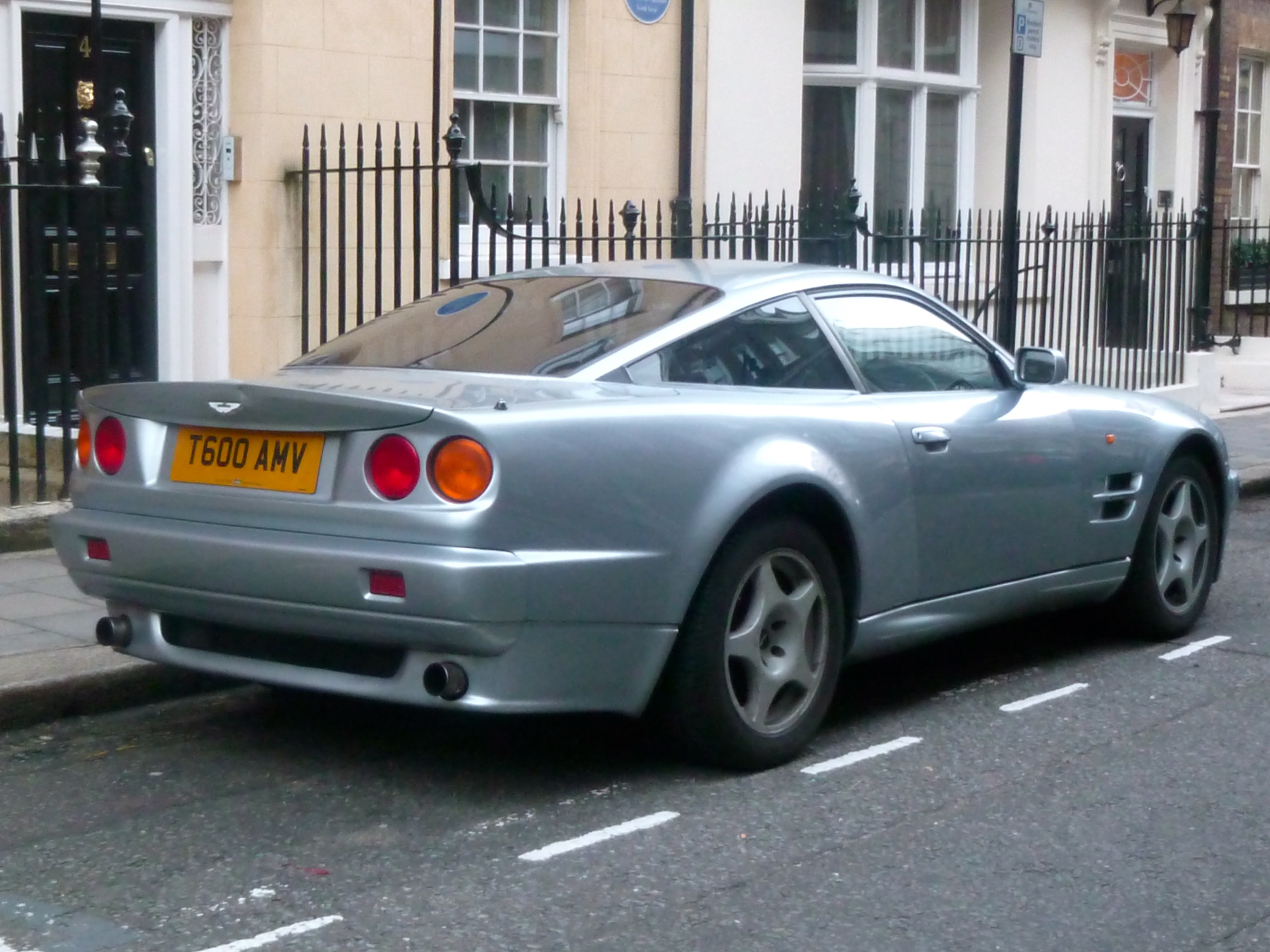
Rear 3/4 view of Vantage V600

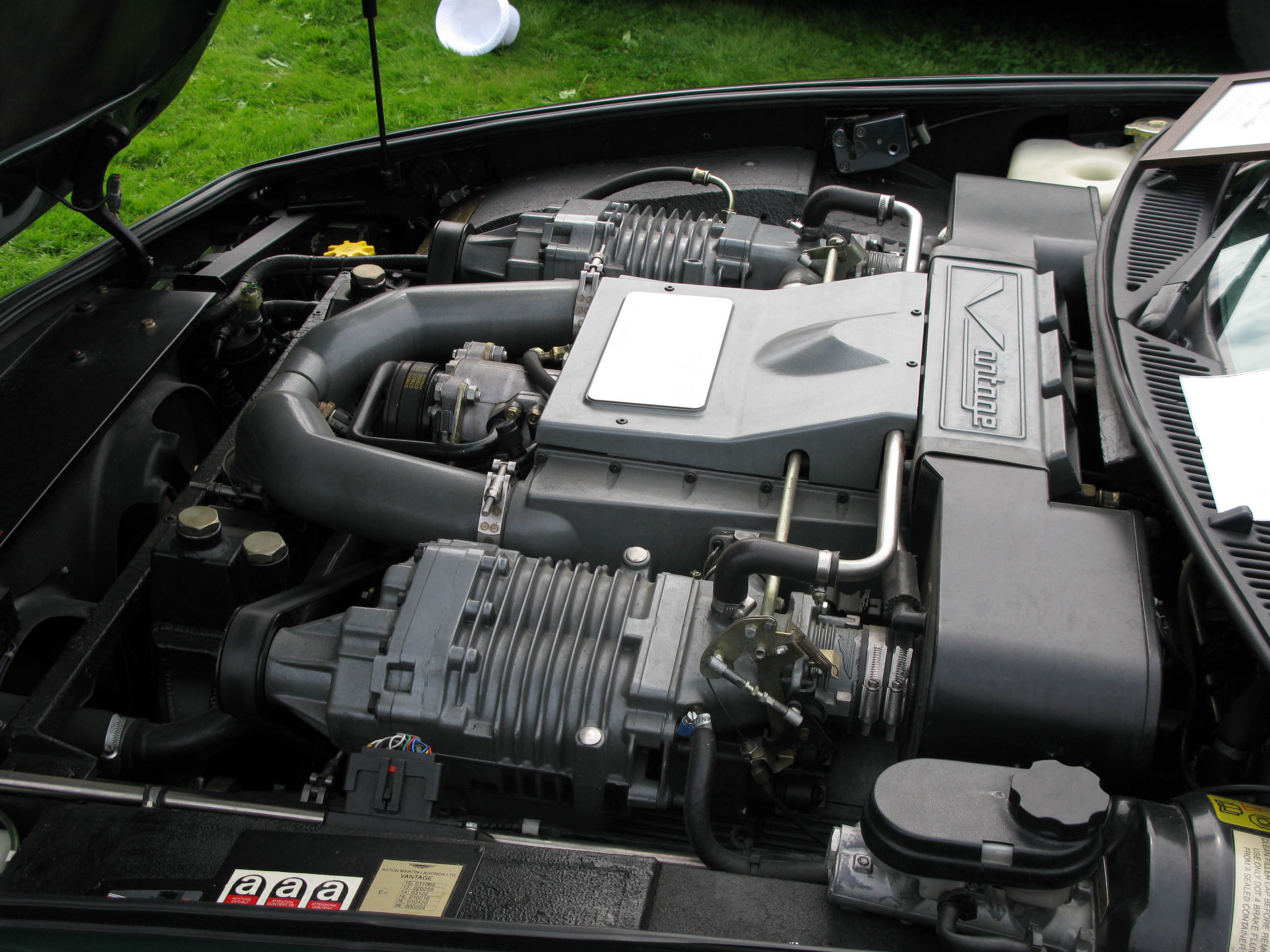
Engine compartment

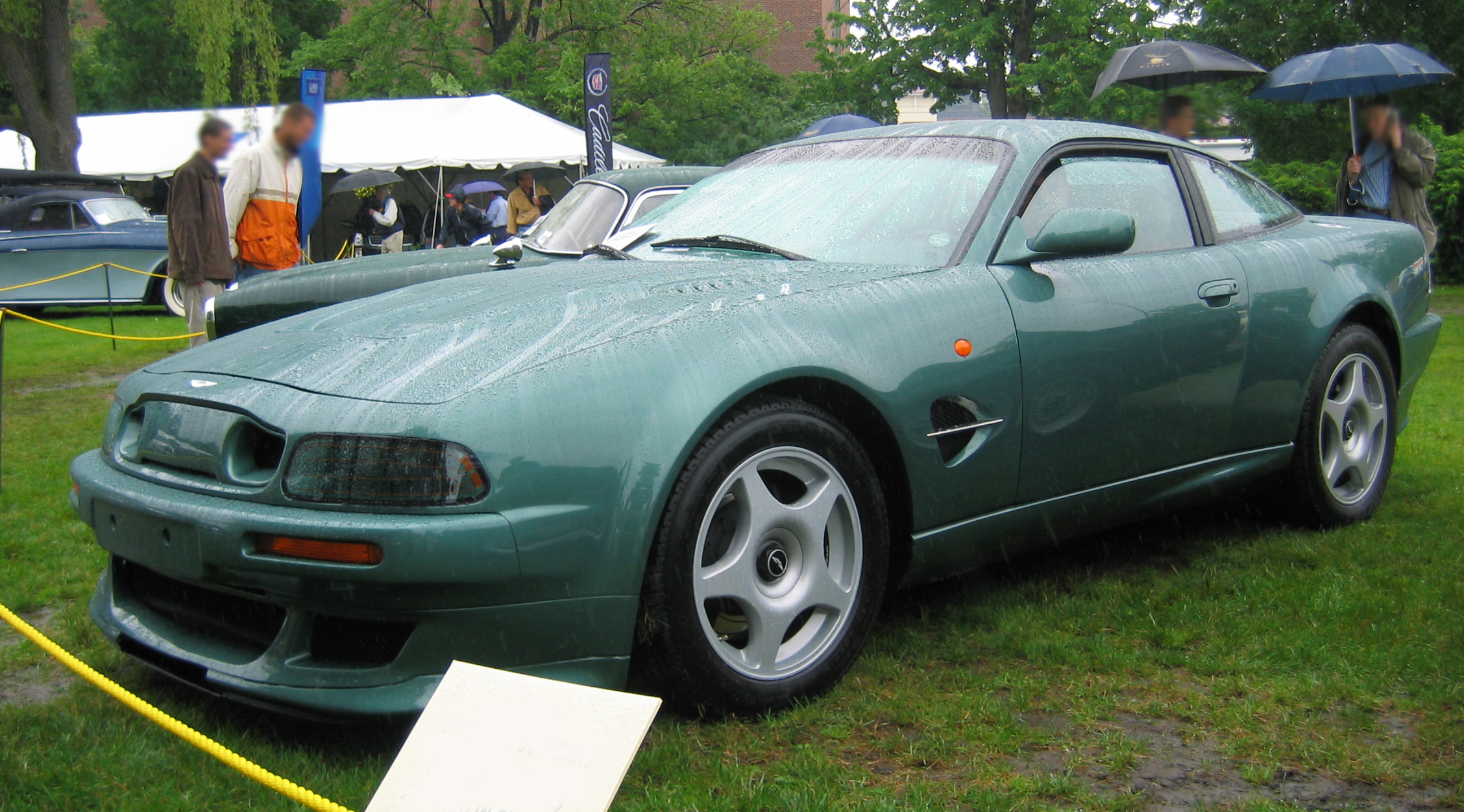
Vantage Le Mans

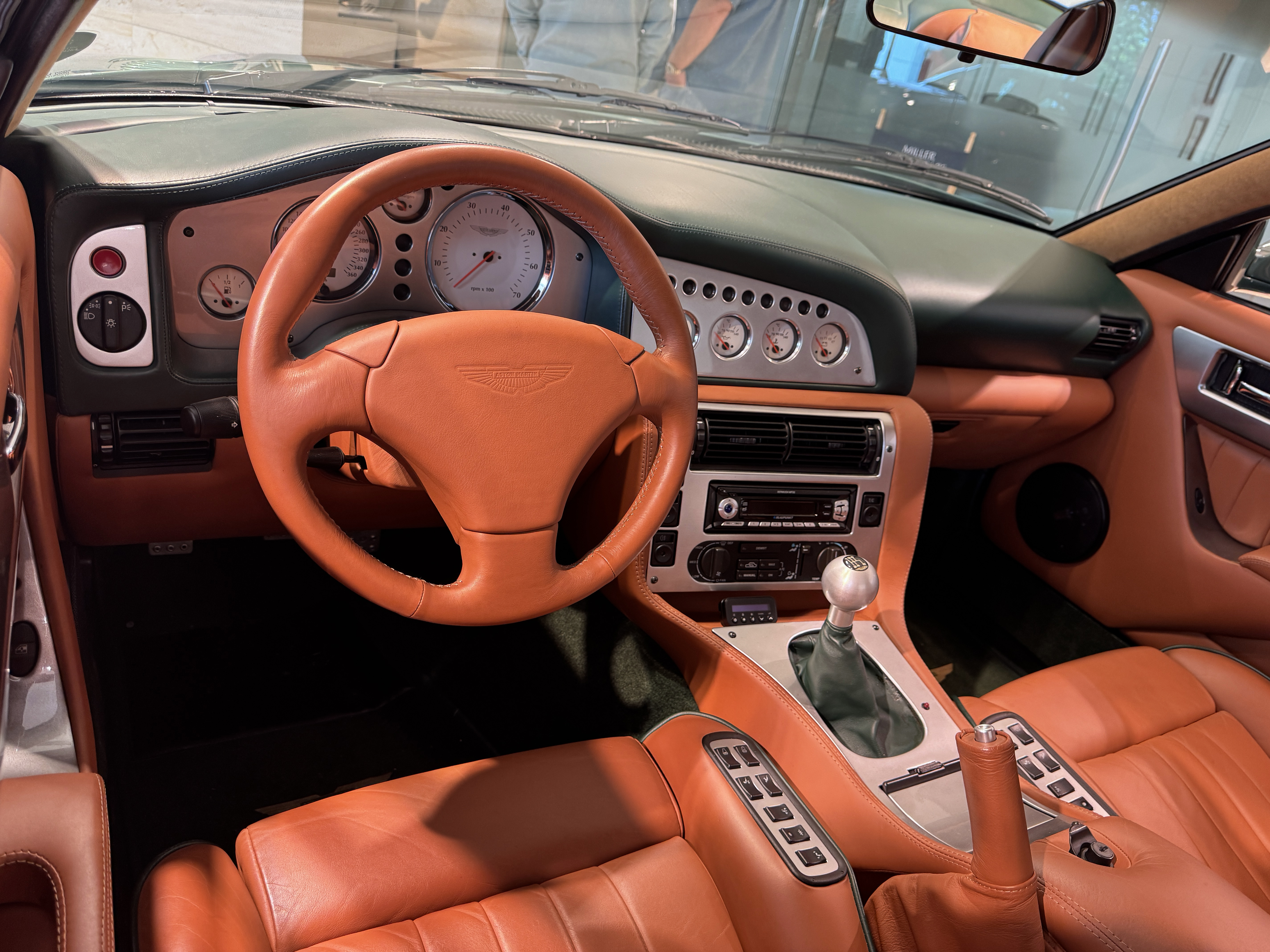
Vantage Le Mans interior

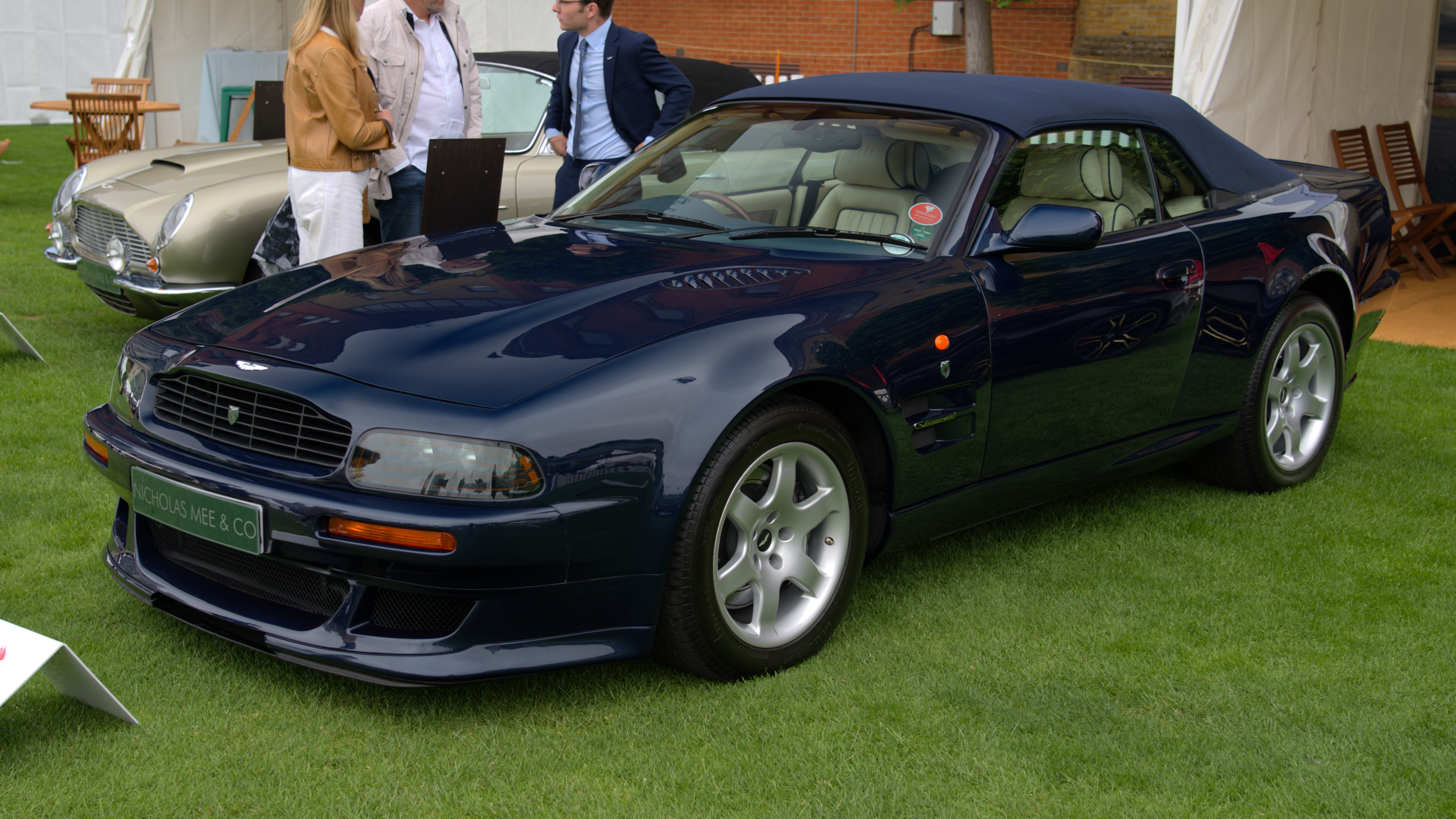
2000 V8 Vantage Volante "Special Edition", 1 of 9

==== V8 Vantage Le Mans ====
New European emission and safety regulations led Aston Martin to decide to end production of the V8-Vantage line. The final model was called "V8 Vantage Le Mans", honoring Aston Martin's 1959 victory at the 24 Hours of Le Mans. The prototype of a limited run of 40 cars was presented in Geneva in 1999 on the 40th anniversary of the win.

All Le Mans Vantages were sent back after delivery to have the engine modifications to deliver 612 PS (450 kW; 604 hp) and 820 N⋅m (605 lbf⋅ft) of torque, and were supported by a suspension reinforced with special Koni shock-absorbers and stiffer anti-roll bars. The bodywork featured a blanked-out front grille and modified side vents – replicating the side vents of the Le Mans winning DBR-1 – as well as a bigger front spoiler and rear skirt. The interior was reworked with a large tachometer, a special titanium finish on some parts, and features such as a heated windshield, parking radars, traction control, heated electric seats, and full Connolly leather upholstery with matching Wilton wool carpets. Wheels were the same Dymag magnesium units seen on most V600s. Performance included a claimed top speed of 320 km/h (200 mph) and 0–100 km/h (0–62 mph) acceleration being achieved in 3.9 seconds. The keyholder was in sterling silver, and a map from Newport-Pagnell to the legendary Le Mans track was provided in the delivery documents. Each car was made upon special commission and fitted with a number plate which also indicated the name of the first owner.

=== US availability ===
The Virage would not become available in the United States until the summer of 1990 and the Virage Volante convertible became available later in 1992. The later V8 Coupe version and the Virage Vantage were not officially offered for sale in the US. Availability was ended after the 1993 model year, due to the lack of passenger airbags and inability to meet emissions regulations.

== Virage (2011–2012) ==
Aston Martin Virage
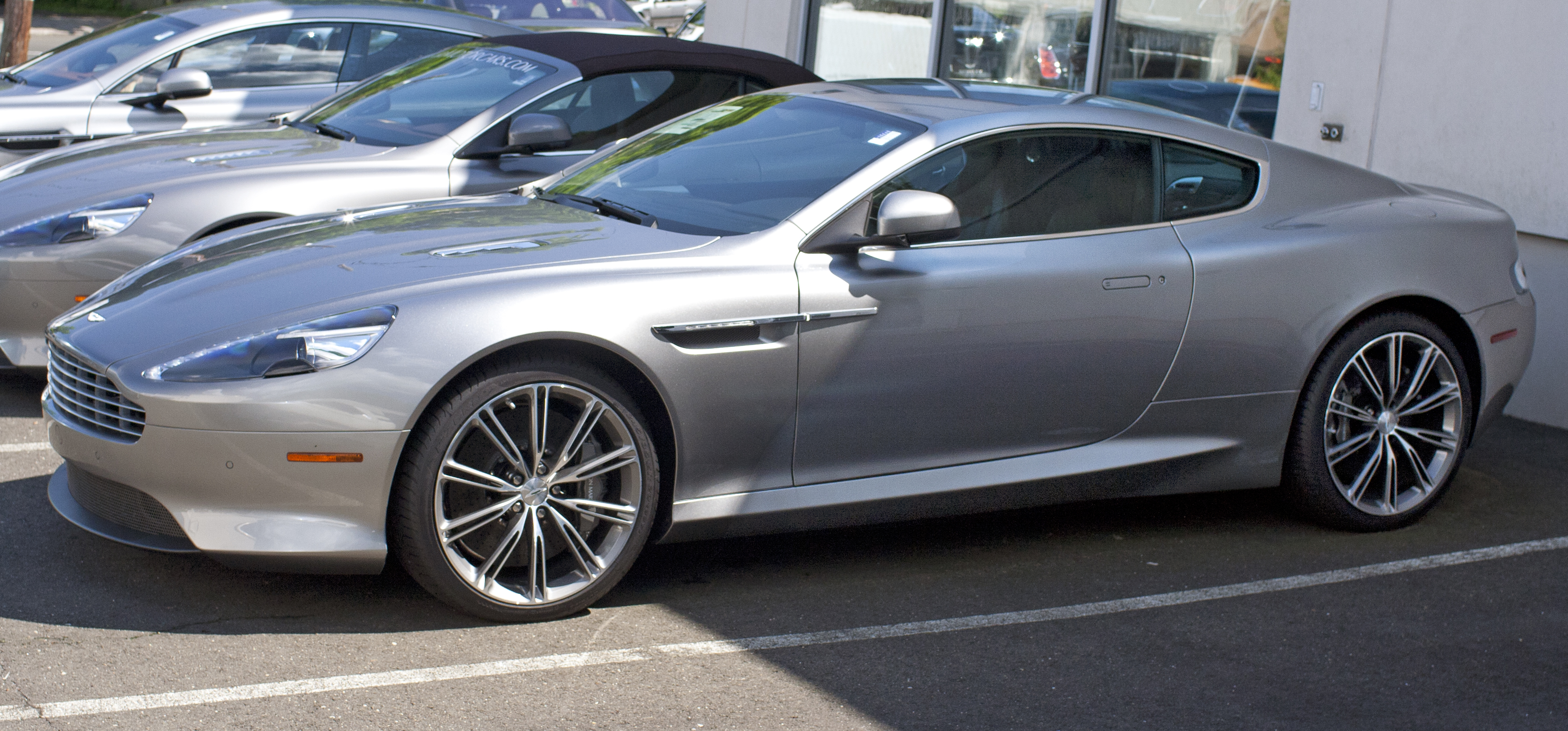

Overview
- Production: March 2011 – September 2012; >1,000 units
- Assembly: United Kingdom: Gaydon, Warwickshire
- Designer: Marek Reichman

Body and chassis
- Body style: 2-door coupé 2-door convertible
- Layout: Front mid-engine, rear-wheel-drive
- Platform: VH Generation III
- Doors: Swan
- Related: Aston Martin DB9; Aston Martin DBS; Aston Martin Rapide

Powertrain
- Engine: 5.9 L AM11 V12
- Transmission: 6-speed ZF 6HP 26 (Touchtronic II) automatic

Dimensions
- Wheelbase: 2,741 mm (107.9 in)
- Length: 4,719 mm (185.8 in)
- Width: 1,905 mm (75.0 in) (without mirrors)
- Height: 1,280 mm (50.4 in)
- Kerb weight: 1,740–1,890 kg (3,836–4,167 lb)

=== Background and release ===
The Virage debuted in March 2011 at the Geneva Motor Show, resurrecting the name first used on the model produced between 1989 and 2000. The official series manufacture of the Virage coupe began in the same month at the Gaydon facility in Warwickshire, England. Aston Martin stated that two hundred hours were spent on each unit at the Gaydon facility, seventy hours of which were on the interior.

=== Design and powertrain ===
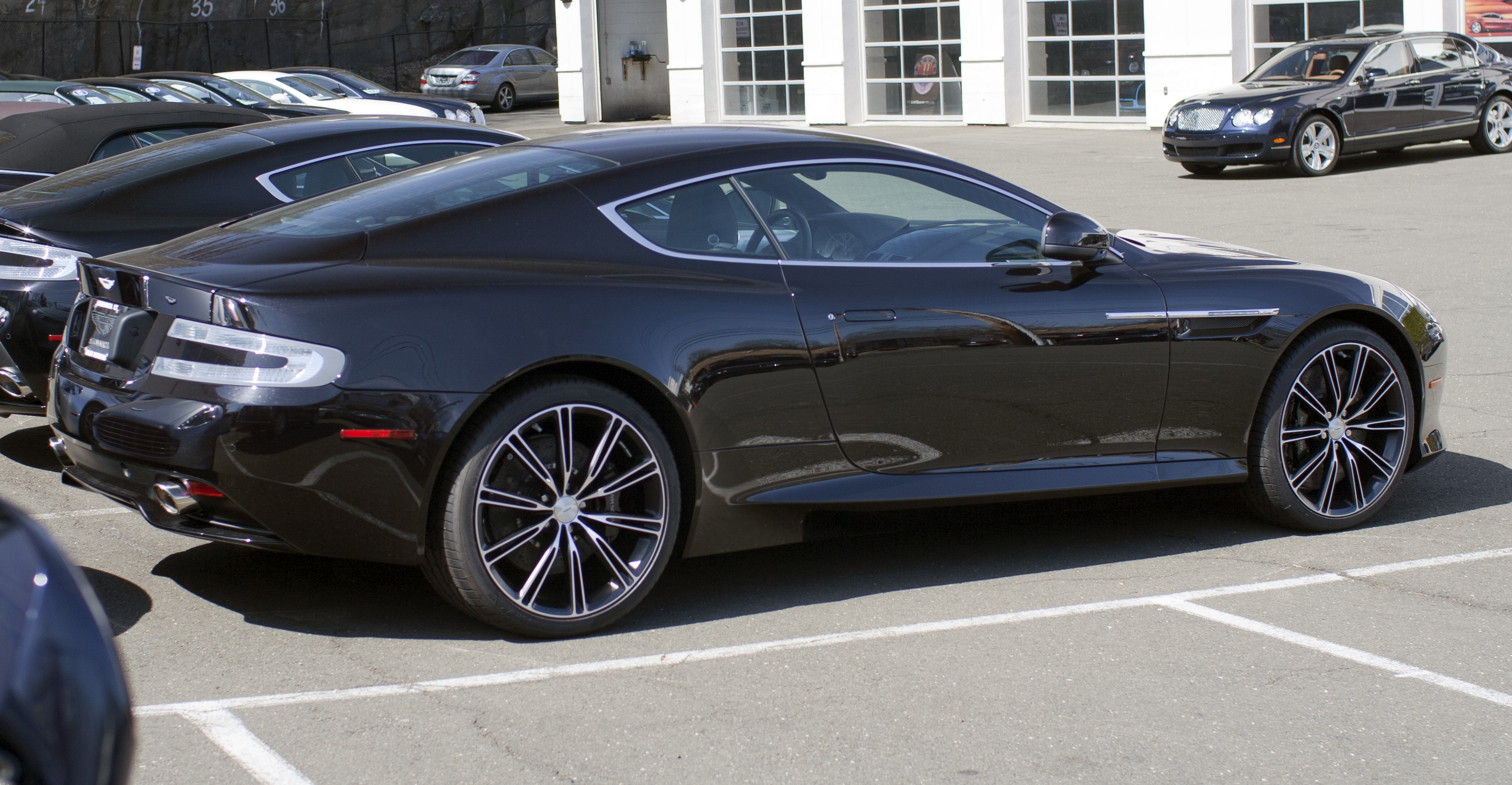
A 2012 model, rear 3/4 view

Designed by Aston Martin's design director Marek Reichman, the Virage is based upon the "vertical/horizontal" platform, which employs extensive use of robust bonded aluminium. The body structure comprises aluminium, magnesium and composite materials, and its kerb weight ranges from 1,740 to 1,785 kg (3,836 to 3,935 lb). The Virage also incorporates anti-roll bars and double wishbone suspension positioned at both the front and rear. The car's dynamics were refined through a new adaptive damper system that can switch through ten stiffness settings in the "Normal" and "Sport" modes. The Virage's rear-wheel drive system with a front-mid engine layout improves weight distribution and performance. The Virage uses a 5.9-litre V12 engine, shared with the DB9. It generated 365 kW (490 hp) at 6,500 rpm and 569 N⋅m (420 lb⋅ft) at 5,750 rpm. The Virage can accelerate from 0 to 97 km/h (60 mph) in 4.6 seconds and has a top speed of 299 km/h (186 mph).

The Virage is considered both a grand tourer and a sports car. The Virage was designed to occupy the narrow space between the DB9 and the more powerful and aggressive DBS. It incorporates a two-door coupe body style, and was available in both a two-seater or a 2+2 design.

The Virage features a six-speed paddle shift automatic transmission developed by the technology company ZF Friedrichshafen called the "Touchtronic II", which is mounted in a rear transaxle. The Virage launched with 510 mm (20 in) wheels, with the front ones measuring 215 mm (8.5 in) in width and the rear ones at 280 mm (11 in). Featuring P245/35R20 tyres in the front with P295/30R20 in the rear, the Virage includes carbon ceramic brakes with six-piston front callipers developed by Brembo.

=== Variants ===
==== Virage Volante ====
The Virage Volante is the convertible version of the Virage coupe model. The car's boot capacity is 172 L (6 cu ft), a 6.5 percent decrease from the coupe. The Volante version is 105 kg (231 lb) heavier, elevating its kerb weight to 1,890 kg (4,170 lb).

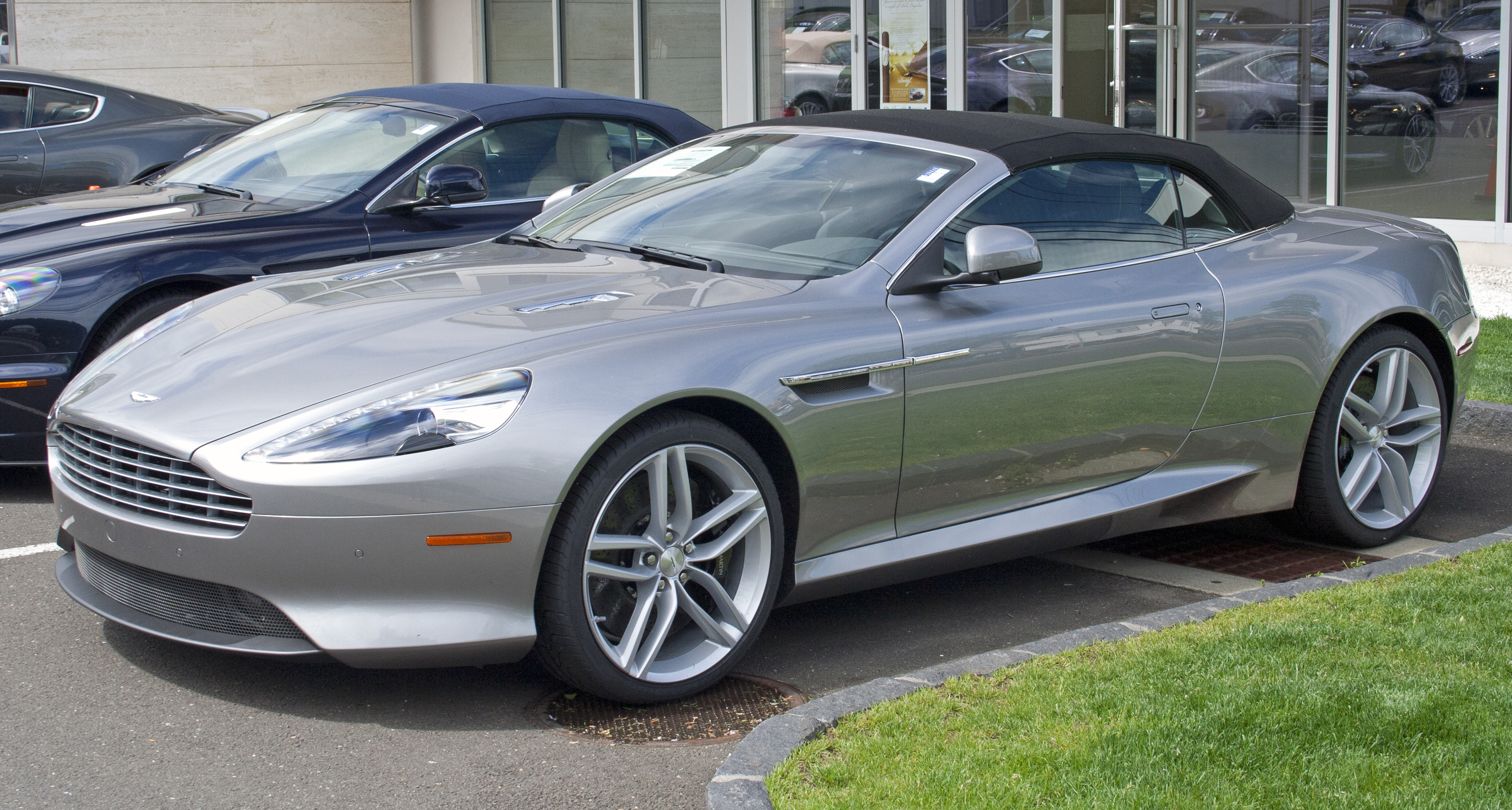
Aston Martin Virage Volante (2012)

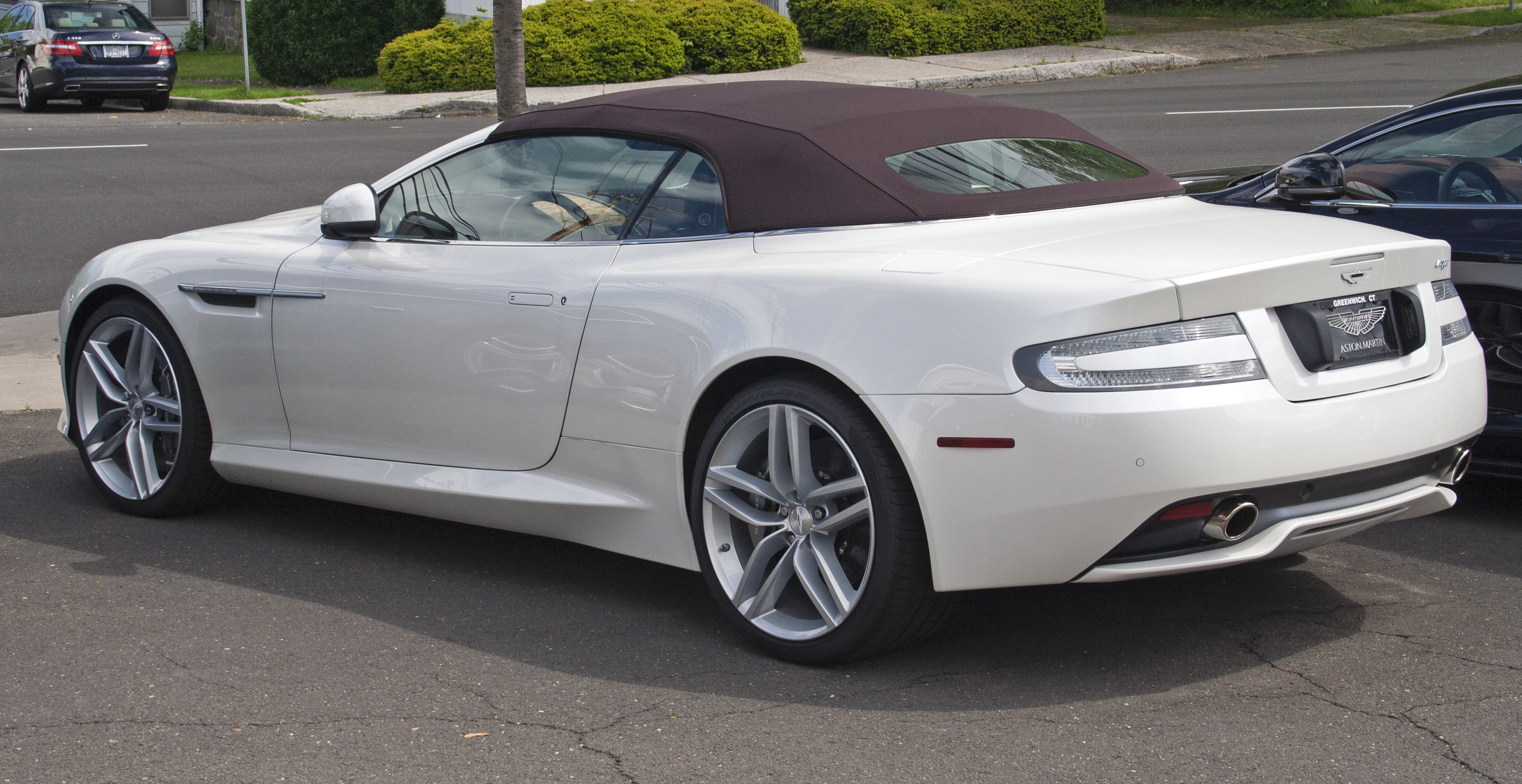
Aston Martin Virage Volante (2012)

==== Virage Shooting Brake Zagato Centennial ====
In September 2014, Zagato revealed a one-off shooting brake, based on the Virage, at the Chantilly Arts & Elegance Concours d’Elegance. It was commissioned by a European client and follows the same design cues as the DBS Coupe Zagato Centennial and DB9 Zagato Spyder Centennial.

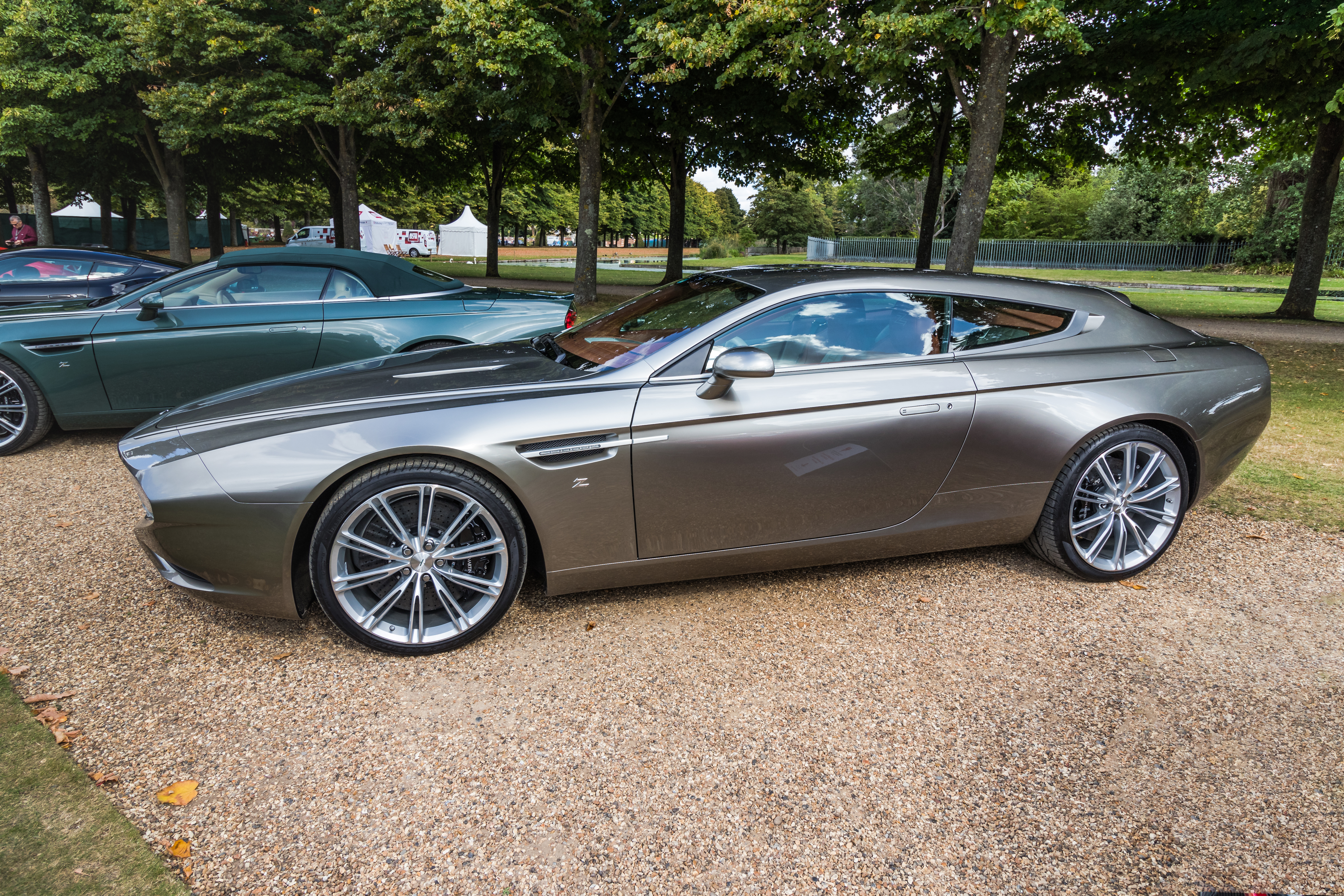
Virage Shooting Brake Zagato

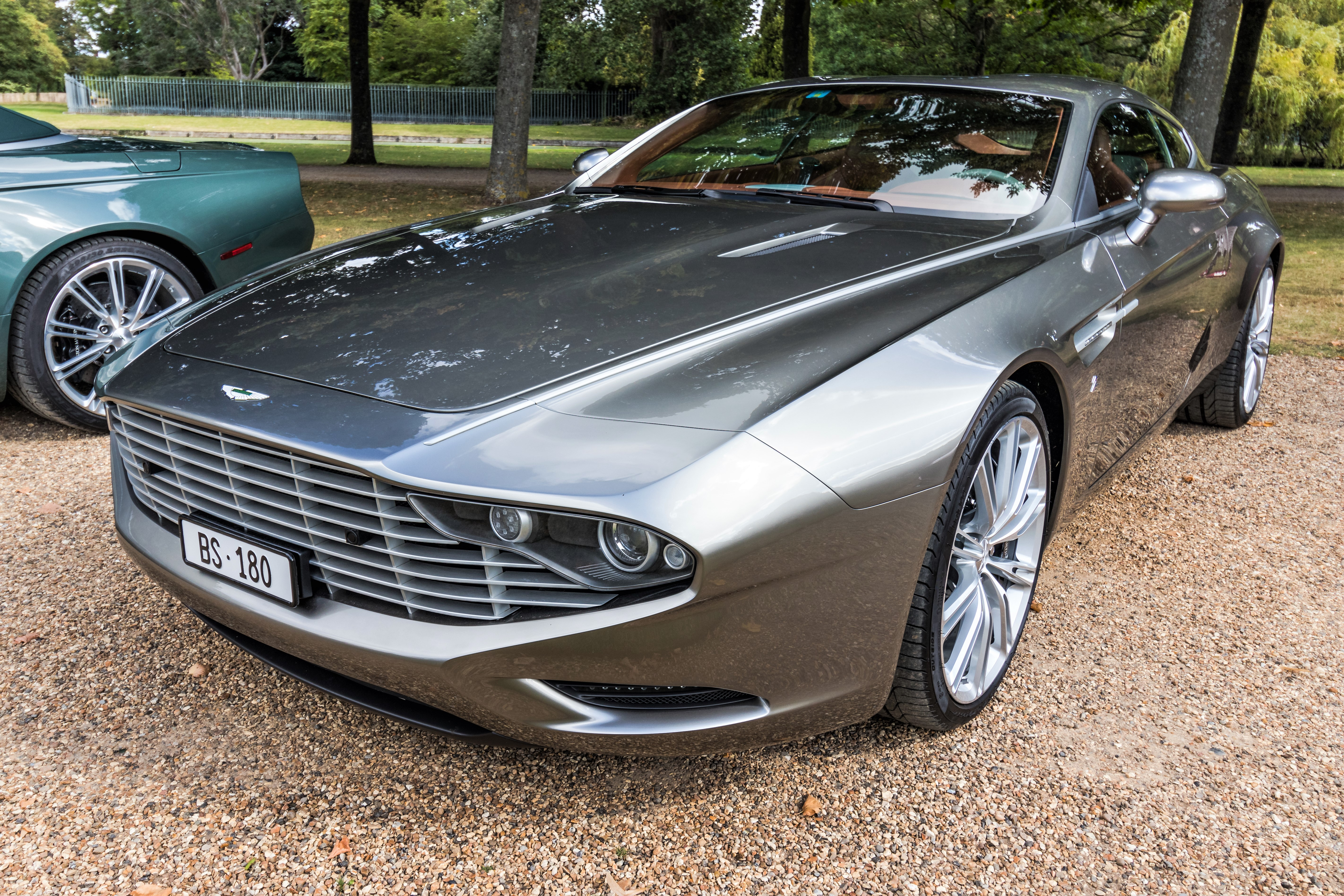
Front detail
