= Aston Martin Atom =

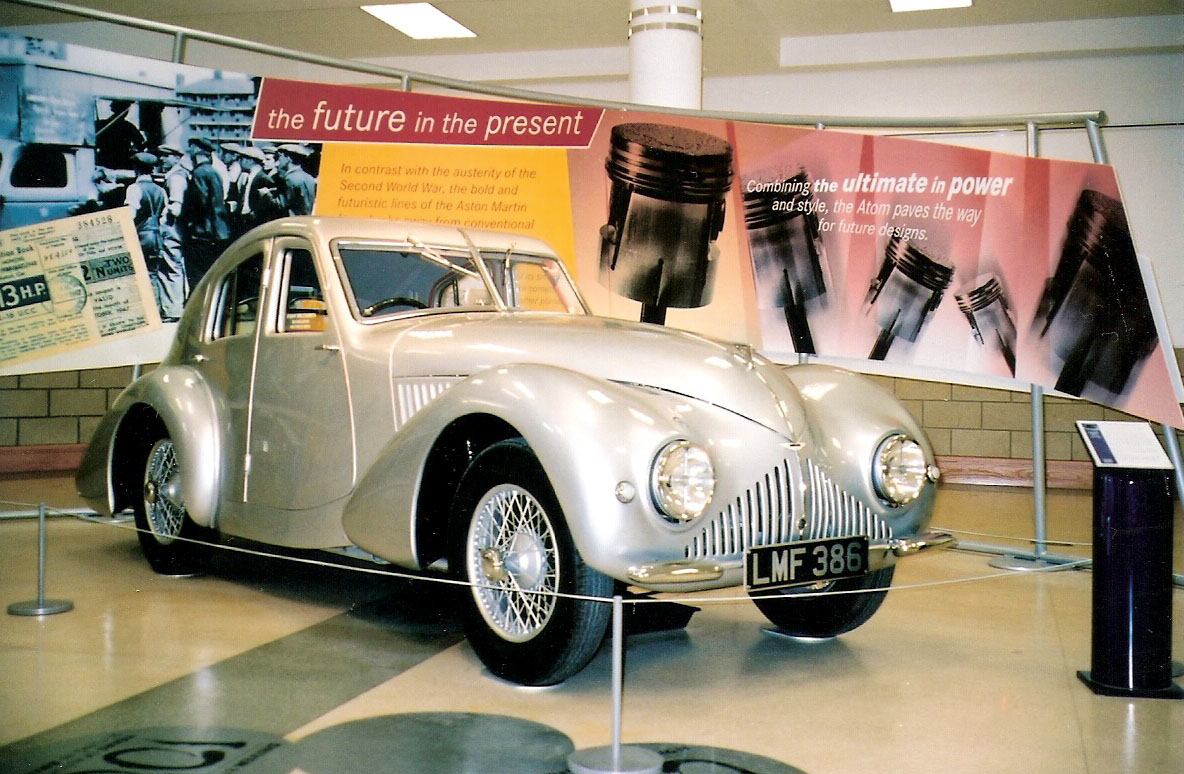

Overview
- Manufacturer: Aston Martin
- Production: 1939–1940
- Designer: Claude Hill

Body and chassis
- Class: Prototype grand tourer
- Body style: 4 door saloon
- Layout: FR

Powertrain
- Engine: 2.0 L (122 cu in) I4
- Transmission: Semi-automatic Cotal preselector

Dimensions
- Wheelbase: 102 in (2,591 mm)
- Kerb weight: 24 long cwt (2,700 lb or 1,200 kg)

The Aston Martin Atom is a prototype automobile built by Aston Martin (AM). Construction of the car began in 1939 and was completed in 1940. The Atom is one of the first fully functional concept cars ever built. Aston Martin explored several new technologies with the Atom, and its chassis design was the basis for the platform used by AM's post-war models, beginning with the 1948 DB1 that evolved out of the Atom, well into the late 1950s.

== History ==
Construction of the Atom was commissioned by R. Gordon Sutherland, AM's Managing Director and son of Arthur Sutherland, the company's owner. Chief engineer Claude Hill led the design effort.

The goal was to produce a small enclosed saloon that was comfortable and possessed good road manners. To meet that goal, emphasis was put on light weight and a rigid chassis. The car's name was chosen to be evocative of something small but powerful.

The Atom broke with traditional body-on-frame construction methods. Its chassis used square and rectangular cross-section steel tubing for both the main chassis and the support framework for the body. This was a continuation of Hill's earlier experiments with a prototype built on chassis J6.403.LS, registered as EML 132, and known informally at the works as Donald Duck.

The Atom was built on chassis G40/900. It was originally powered by the same type of engine used in the model 15/98. After World War II (WWII) that engine was replaced by EN4/48/2, an instance of the new four-cylinder engine that would later power the Aston Martin 2-Litre Sports model.

Aston Martin and Hill applied for twenty-seven patents on technologies developed for the Atom, including ones related to the body, chassis, and engine.

A Road Tax disc was issued for the car by the Department of Transport on 14 July 1940. It was registered as LMF 386.

The Atom appeared at the Chessington Rally in 1941.

It is reported that David Brown decided to buy the Aston Martin company after having driven the Atom in 1947.

The Atom's chassis design was adapted for use in the 2-Litre Sports by the addition of extra bracing needed to compensate for the loss of stiffness due to the new model's drophead coupé body. The same basic chassis would later be adapted for the DB2, the DB2/4, and the DB2/4 MkIII, staying in production until 1959. This lineage ended with the release of the DB4.

Sutherland kept the Atom as a personal vehicle after the sale of the factory to Brown, putting about 100,000 mi (161,000 km) on the car before selling it in 1949. In 1951 the Atom was owned by C.F. Mayo, and by 1953 the car had become the property of Bob Gathercole, godson of W. O. Bentley. In 1965, after some other intermediate owners, the Atom was bought by ex-Aston racing driver Nigel Mann, who kept the car in France until 1986, when it was purchased by Tom Rollason, who repatriated it to the UK where it underwent a full restoration.

In June 2014 the Atom was put up for auction by Bonhams at the Goodwood Festival of Speed. Bidding did not reach the reserve and there was no sale. By the time of this auction the car had been driven 250,000 mi (402,336 km).

The General Motors Buick Y-Job is often described as the first ever concept car; the Atom, which debuted just months after, is considered to have been Europe's first.

== Features ==
=== Body and chassis ===
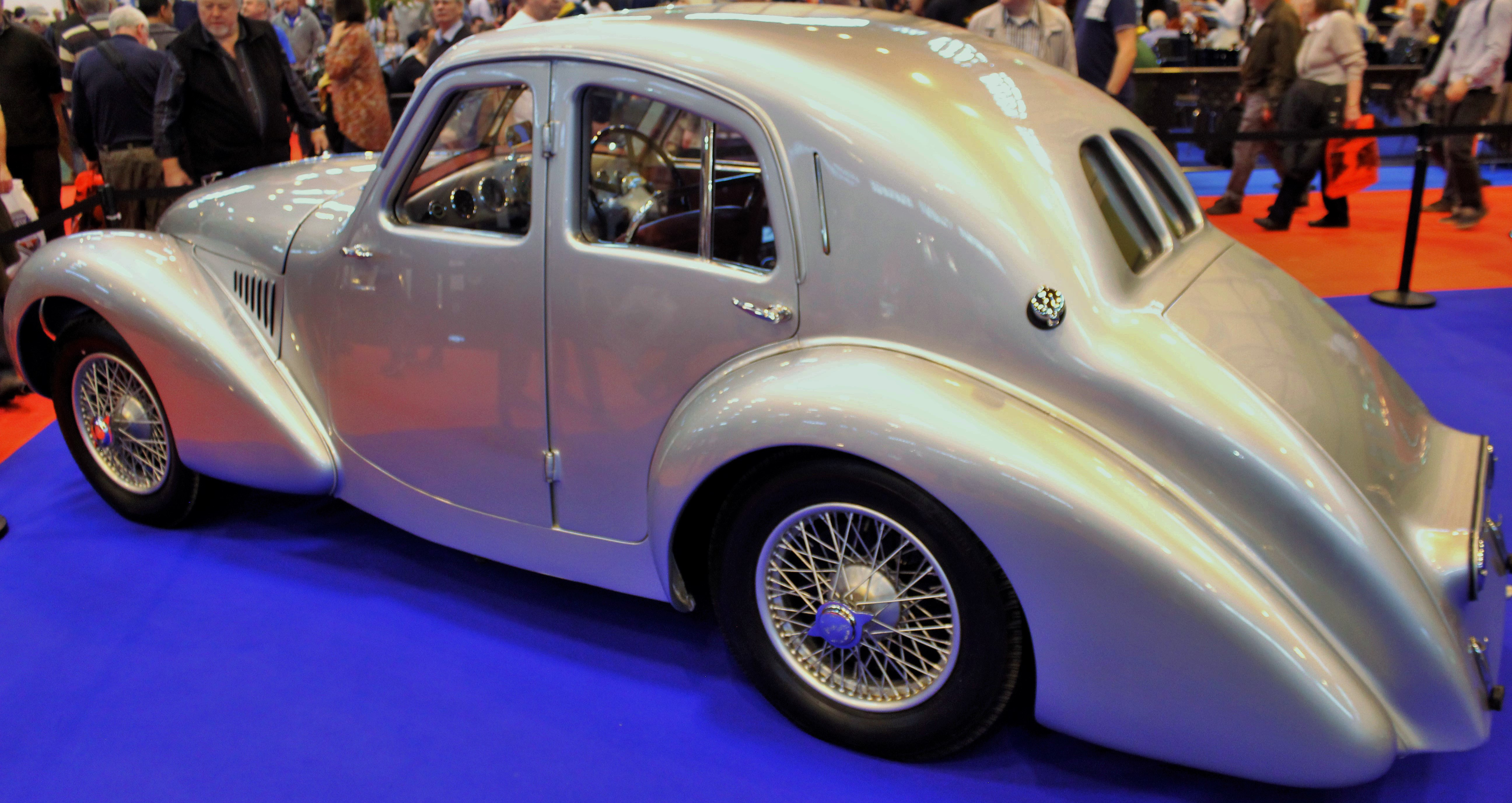
Rear three-quarter view

The chassis of the Atom has been called a "skeleton frame", a "tubular monocoque", a "tubular unitary body", and a "space frame". It consists of a box frame built with 2½" x 1¼" 13 gauge rectangular mild steel tubing, with an upper structure to support the body and additional bracing made from 1¼"x 1¼" 18 gauge square section tubing.

The car's unstressed aluminium bodywork is attached using a combination of self-tapping screws and bolts paired with Nyloc nuts. Both the car's shape and construction methods reflect the influence of contemporary aircraft methods. The body shape is of a streamlined four door saloon, with both front and rear doors hinged on the B-pillar. The windscreen is of two pieces of flat glass that meet at a centre joint. Instead of a separate grille, cooling air is admitted through a series of twenty-four vertical slits in the front bodywork, increasing in height as they converge towards the car's centreline.

Elements of the car's aircraft influence can also be seen in its hammock-style front seats on the interior and its delta-wing-shaped bonnet release.

=== Running gear ===
The Atom was the first ever Aston Martin with an independent front suspension. The system is based on a design patented by F. G. Gordon Armstrong of the Armstrong Shock Absorber Company, and as adapted by Hill comprises twin trailing arms, coil springs and Armstrong lever dampers with split track rods.

In 1919 the Salisbury Axle Company was acquired by the Spicer Manufacturing Corporation (later Dana Incorporated). The Atom is the first British car to be fitted with a Salisbury rear axle with hypoid bevel gears and a carrier-style differential axle housing. The Salisbury axle allowed the car's propeller shaft to be 2 in (51 mm) lower than it would have otherwise been, reducing its intrusion into available interior space. The rear axle is suspended on semi-elliptical leaf springs in a Hotchkiss drive system. Rear dampers are Armstrong lever arm units.

Brakes front and rear are 12 in (305 mm) Lockheed drums. The car's 5.50 × 17" tyres are mounted on 17 in × 2.75 in (432 mm × 70 mm) Rudge-Whitworth knock-on wire wheels.

=== Drivetrain ===
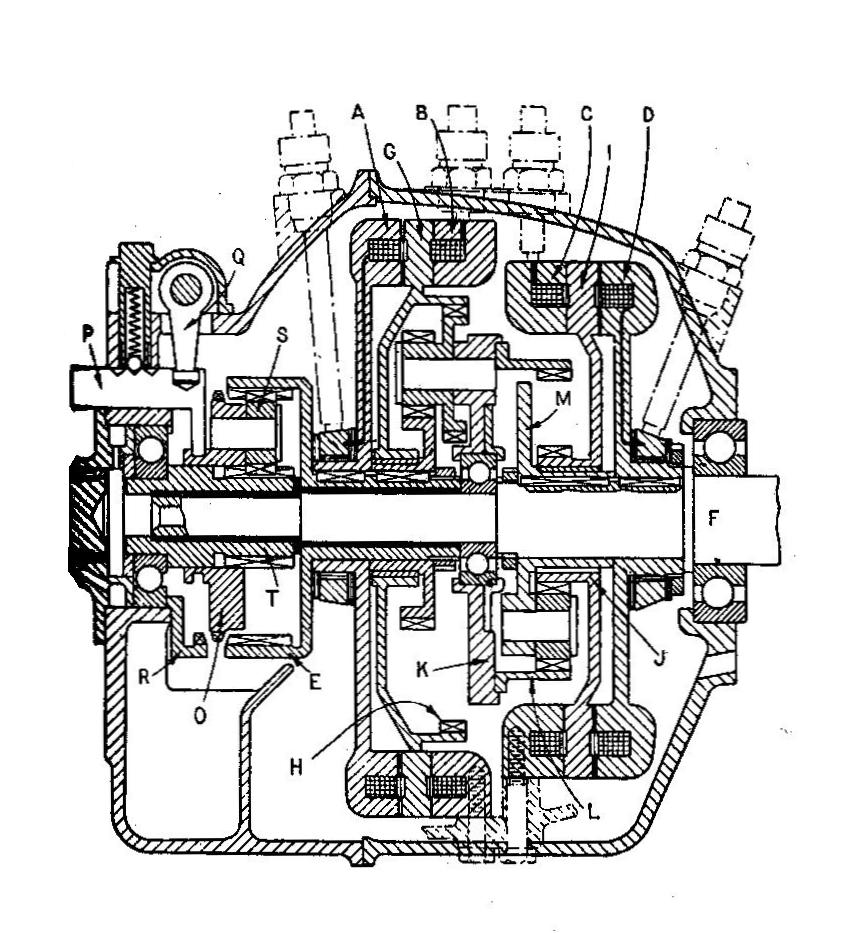
Cotal transmission diagram

The Atom's original engine was a single overhead camshaft (SOHC) inline four designed by Hill. With a bore of 78 mm (3.07 in) and stroke of 102 mm (4.02 in), it displaced 1,949 cc (118.9 cu in). It was fitted with dual Zenith carburettors. This 2.0 L design was the successor to an earlier 1.5 L SOHC Aston Martin engine developed in or around 1930 for the R&B car by A C Bertelli and William Renwick along with Hill. Hill started work on the 2.0 L engine in 1935. While still a SOHC inline-four, it shared almost no parts with the earlier 1.5 L unit. The 2.0 L was fitted to Speed Model cars in 1936.

In 1944 the Atom's SOHC engine was replaced by a new overhead valve (OHV) four cylinder also designed by Hill. The bore × stroke of this engine are 82.6 mm × 92 mm (3.25 in × 3.62 in) respectively, for a swept volume of 1,972 cc (120.3 cu in). This engine is fed by two SU carburettors. Patents were granted for the 2.0 L engine in 1945.

The transmission in the Atom is a semi-automatic Cotal preselector. This transmission uses electromagnets to engage the gears, and provides the same four ratios and, potentially, speed in the reverse direction as the forward. The car has two controls for the transmission; a floor lever that selects forward, neutral, or reverse, and a small lever in an H-shaped gate mounted under the fascia that the driver uses to select the desired gear.
