= DB1 =

DB1 may refer to:

- Aston Martin 2-Litre Sports, an English sports car.
- Dark Beginning 1, a Yu-Gi-Oh! Trading Card Game booster pack.
- db1.mdb is the default file name for databases created in Microsoft Access versions up to 2003.
- Deutsche Börse, a company traded under the stock symbol DB1.
