= DB2 (disambiguation) =

DB2 may refer to:

== Software ==
- IBM Db2, a family of relational databases for various platforms
- A series of PC-based software packages existed (II, III, IV), starting in the 1980s: The first was named dBase II, a database program for the CP/M and MS-DOS operating systems

== Other ==
- Aston Martin DB2, a model from the English sport car brand Aston Martin.
- DB2 (bike), a motorcycle build from Bimota.
