= Aston Martin 2-Litre Sports =

Aston Martin DB1
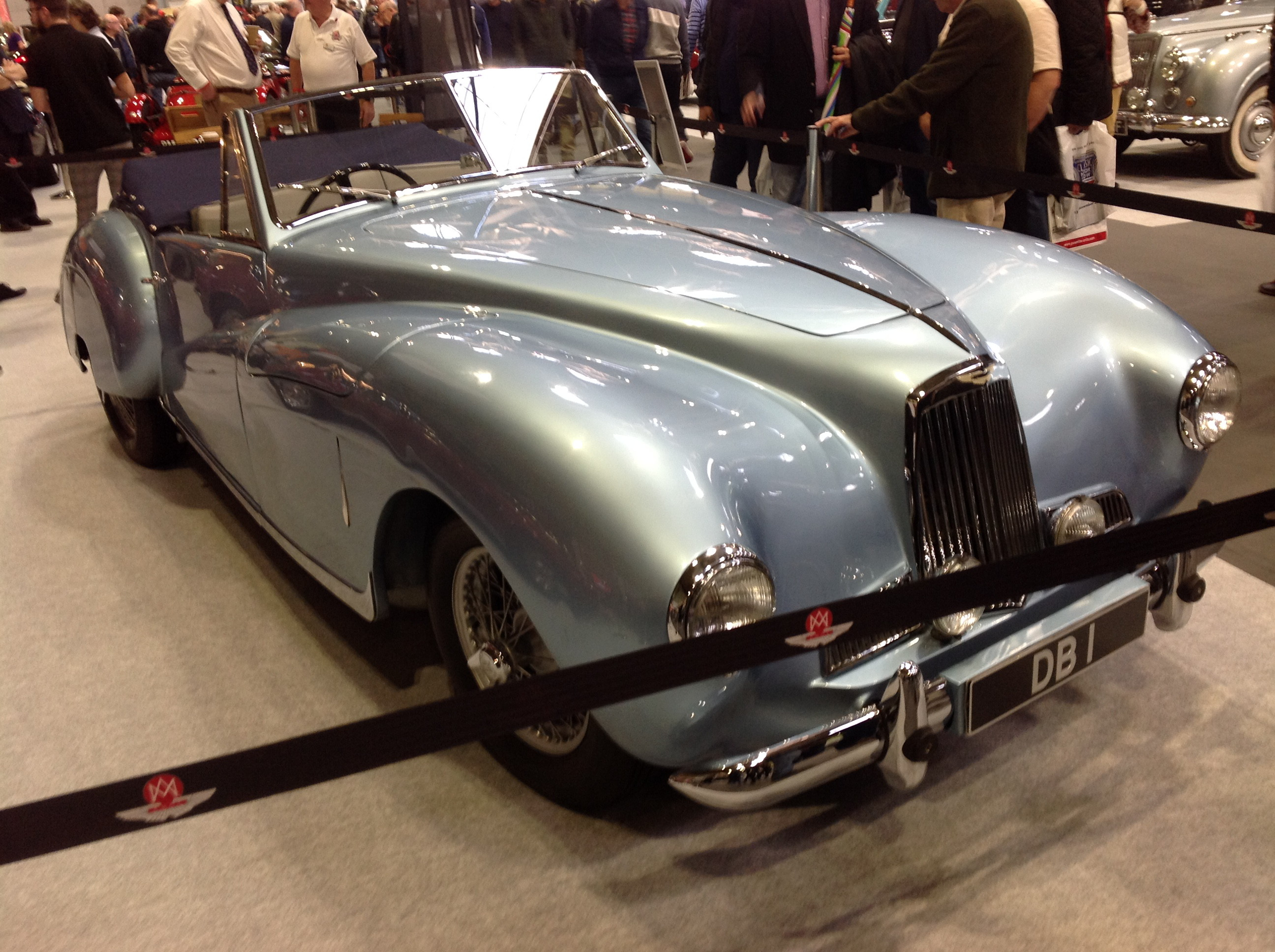

Overview
- Manufacturer: Aston Martin Lagonda Limited
- Production: 1948–1950; 15 produced
- Designer: Frank Feeley

Body and chassis
- Class: Sports car
- Body style: 2-seat roadster
- Layout: FR layout

Powertrain
- Engine: 1.97 L I4

Dimensions
- Length: 4,470 mm (176.0 in)
- Width: 1,715 mm (67.5 in)
- Kerb weight: 1,143 kg (2,520 lb)

Chronology
- Successor: Aston Martin DB2

The Aston Martin 2-Litre Sports is a sports car sold by Aston Martin from 1948 to 1950. It was the first product of the company under David Brown's ownership and is retrospectively known as the DB1. The car debuted at the 1948 London Motor Show and was based on the Aston Martin Atom prototype. Only 15 were sold.

== History ==
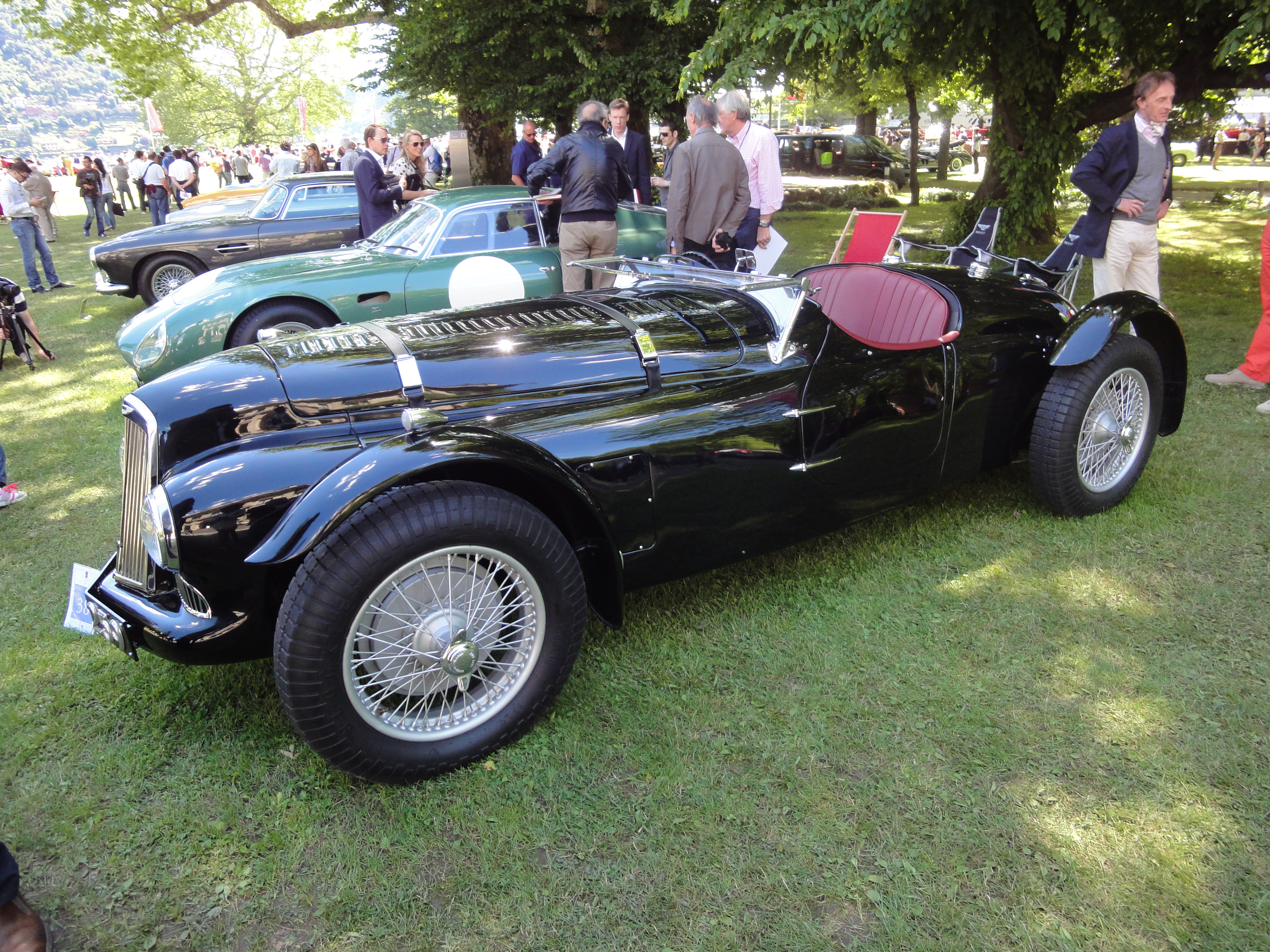
The "Spa Replica" at Concorso d'Eleganza Villa d'Este in 2013.

The Atom was an Aston Martin project developed during World War II. Its tube-frame chassis and 2.0 L four-cylinder engine were developed by Claude Hill. Shortly after David Brown purchased Aston Martin, construction began on an updated version. This prototype was entered at the 24 Hours race at Spa in 1948 as a way of testing its durability, and the car won the race outright with drivers St. John Horsfall and Leslie Johnson. The Spa car was rebuilt and shown at the London Motor Show as an example of a new "Spa Replica" series for public sale, but there were no takers. The single Spa car has been until recently kept in the Dutch Motor Museum. In 2006 it returned to the UK and has been fully restored.

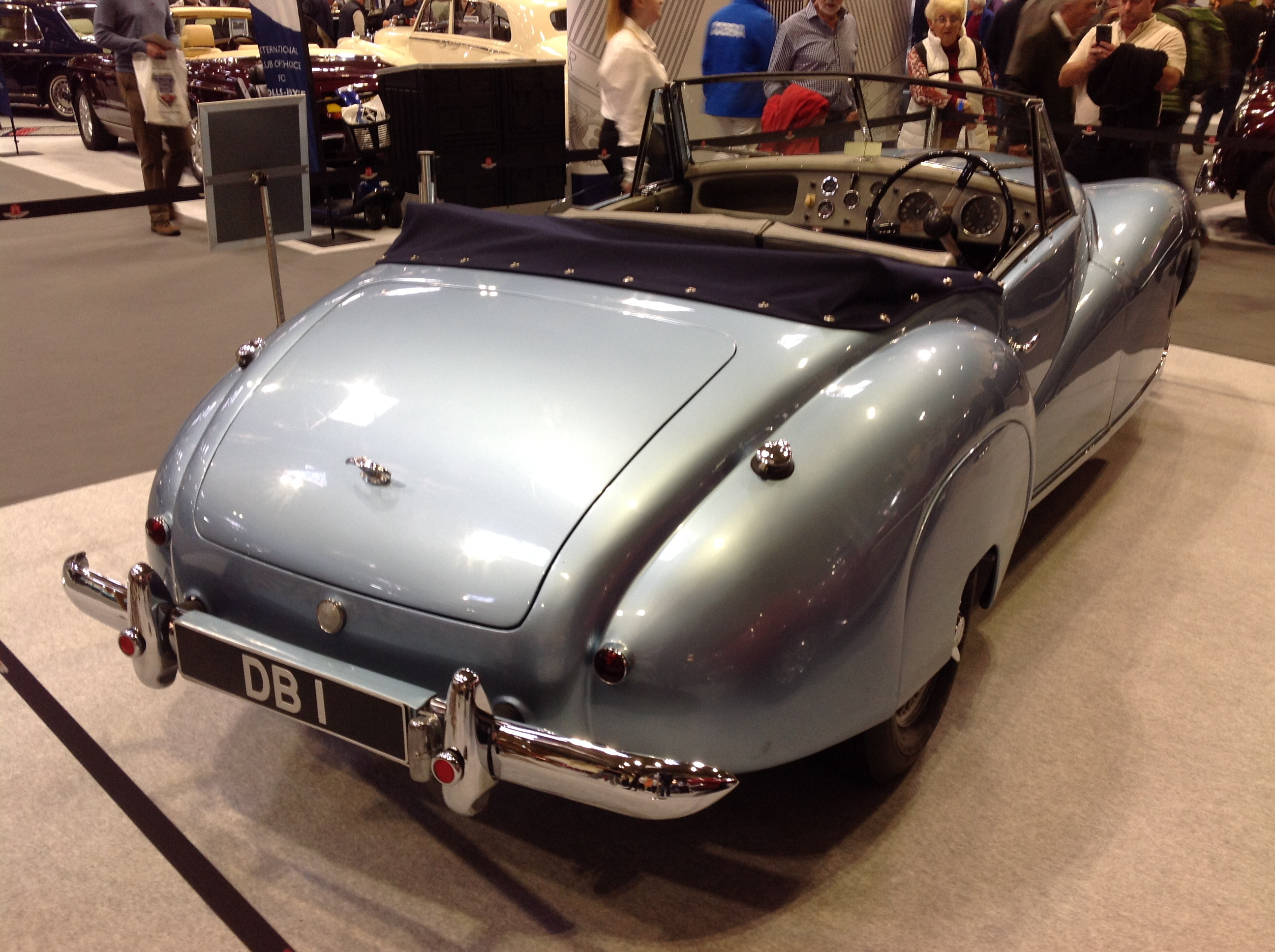
Aston Martin DB1 rear

Along with the cycle-wing Spa car, Brown directed Aston to build a 2-seat roadster with a more conventional body for the London show. This 2-Litre Sports, as the name suggested, used the 2.0 L Claude Hill engine. This 90 hp (67 kW) unit could propel the small, light vehicle to 93 mph (150 km/h).

13 of the cars wore an open roadster body, as shown in London, complete with a three-part grille suggesting the later Aston Martin design. One unusual feature of these cars was the compartment in one front wing for the spare wheel. One more 2-Litre car was shipped as a chassis for custom coachwork.

After the 1950 introduction of the replacement DB2, with the W. O. Bentley designed Lagonda straight-6 engine, the 2-Litre Sports became known widely as the DB1. At this point only 12 had been produced; however since the DB2 was a hardtop and the occasional customer still wanted a softtop, chassis numbers 13, 14, and 15 were produced to special order.

A 1949 Aston Martin DB1 (reg UMD123) was sold to New Zealand in 1991, then sold to Japan in 1994 but stolen off the wharf, possibly by a Japanese gangster. It was recovered in 2007, and then sold to an Australian.
