= Frank Feeley =

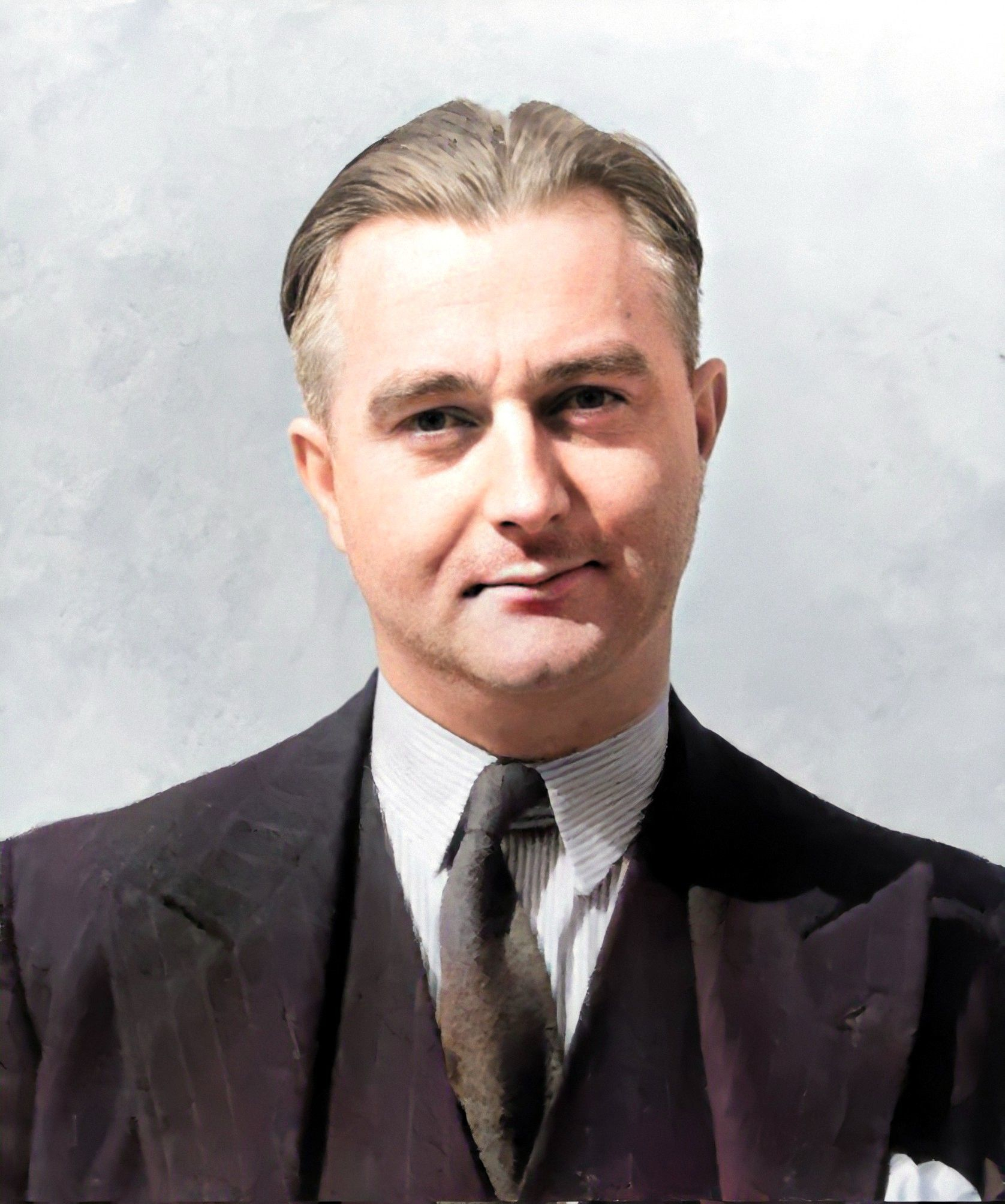

Frank Gerald Feeley, born in Staines-upon-Thames on 16 January 1912, was an automotive stylist and designer. He joined Lagonda based in Staines, where his father, Jeremiah Feeley, also worked, straight from school as an office boy under Arthur Thatcher, the assistant works manager responsible for coachbuilding. He went on to work for Walter Buckingham who was in charge of body design and when the Lagonda Rapier was introduced in 1933 Feeley designed a four-seat tourer body for the demonstrator.

In the mid 1930s Lagonda got into financial difficulties. The receiver was called in and Feeley left to join coachbuilding company Newns based in Thames Ditton. His first job at Eagle coachworks, the trading name used by Newns, was to design a special body for Sir Malcolm Campbell's tuned Rapier. Meanwhile, Lagonda was rescued from receivership and in 1937 Feeley returned to work there as body designer.

At first he was employed updating existing models but in 1937 he produced a complete new design for the LG45 Rapide and the Lagonda V12 and shown at the 1939 New York Motor Show where it was described as: "The highest price car in the show this year is tagged $8,900. It is a Lagonda, known as the 'Rapide' model, imported from England. The power plant is a twelve-cylinder V engine developing 200 horsepower."

When Lagonda was acquired by David Brown in 1947, Frank Feeley along with the rest of the Lagonda design team began to work for David Brown's Aston Martin. His first project at Aston Martin was the new DB1. He went on to design the 1949 Le Mans racer which would utilise the recently acquired Lagonda 2.6-Litre engine, and which would evolve into the DB2.

Frank Feeley remained Aston Martin's in house designer up until 1956 when the company moved operations to Newport Pagnell and Frank was unable to move with them. He went on to work in the aircraft industry and continued to live in Staines until his death in August 1985.
