= W. O. Bentley =

English engineer (1888–1971)

Walter Bentley MBE
- Born: 16 September 1888; Hampstead, England
- Died: 13 August 1971 (aged 82); Woking, England
- Education: King's College London
- Known for: Founder of Bentley
- Relatives: T. G. Waterhouse (grandfather)
- Nationality: English
Motorcycle racing career statistics
Isle of Man TT career
TTs contested	2 (1909–1910)
TT wins	0
TT podiums	0

Walter Owen Bentley, MBE (16 September 1888 – 13 August 1971) was an English engineer who founded Bentley in London. He was a motorcycle and car racer as a young man. After making a name for himself as a designer of aircraft and automobile engines, Bentley established his own firm in 1919. He built the firm into one of the world's premier luxury and performance auto manufacturers, and led the marque to multiple victories at the 24 Hours of Le Mans. After selling his namesake company to Rolls-Royce in 1931, he was employed as a designer for Lagonda, Aston Martin and Armstrong Siddeley.

== Early life ==
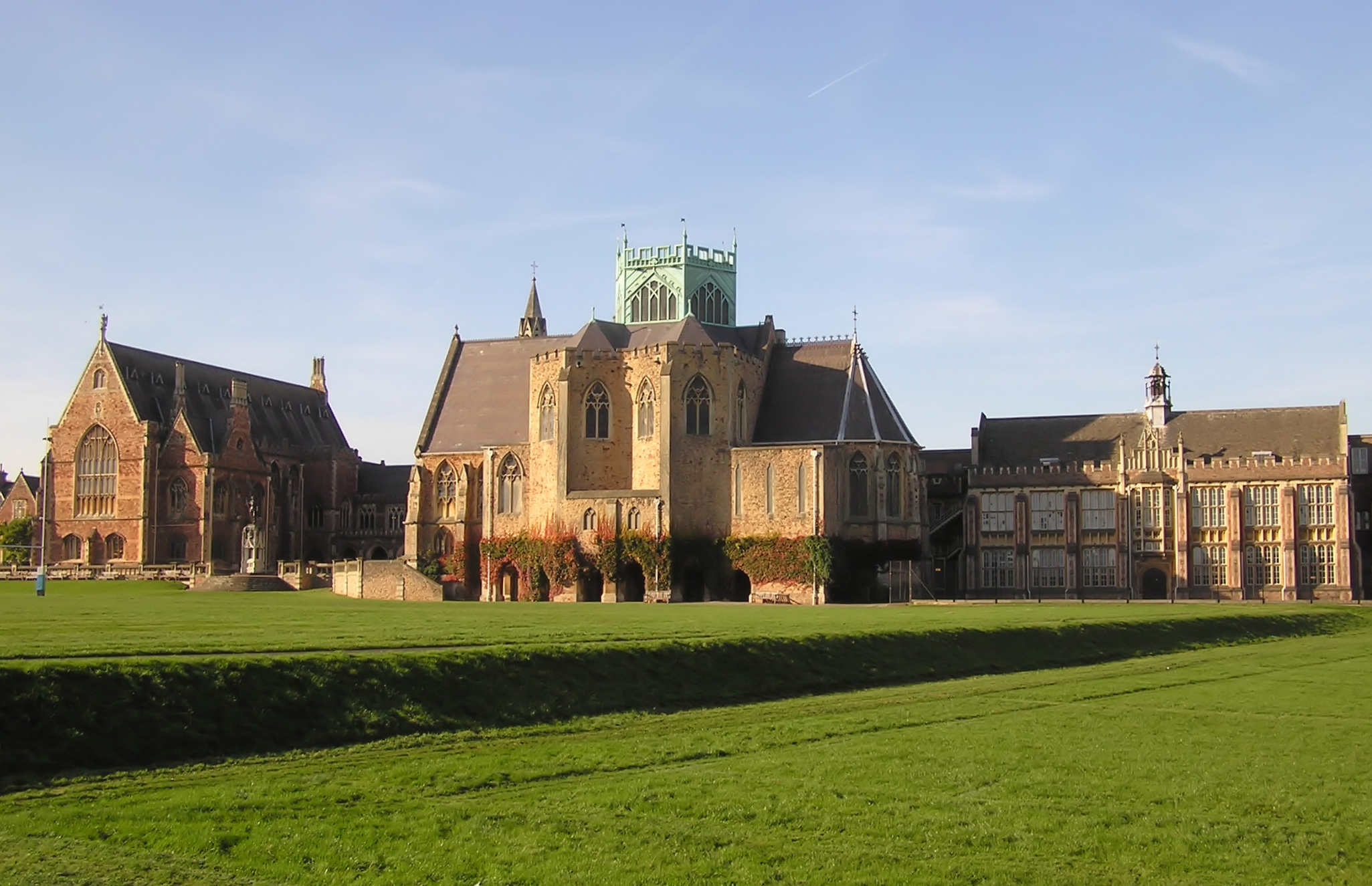
Clifton College where Bentley was educated.

Bentley was born on 16 September 1888, in Hampstead, London. He was the youngest of nine children. His father Alfred Bentley was a retired businessman and his mother Emily (née Waterhouse), daughter of T. G. Waterhouse, was born in Adelaide, Australia. As the son of a prosperous family he was privately educated at Clifton College in Bristol from 1902 until 1905, when at the age of 16 he left to start work as an apprentice engineer with the Great Northern Railway at Doncaster Works.

=== Locomotives ===
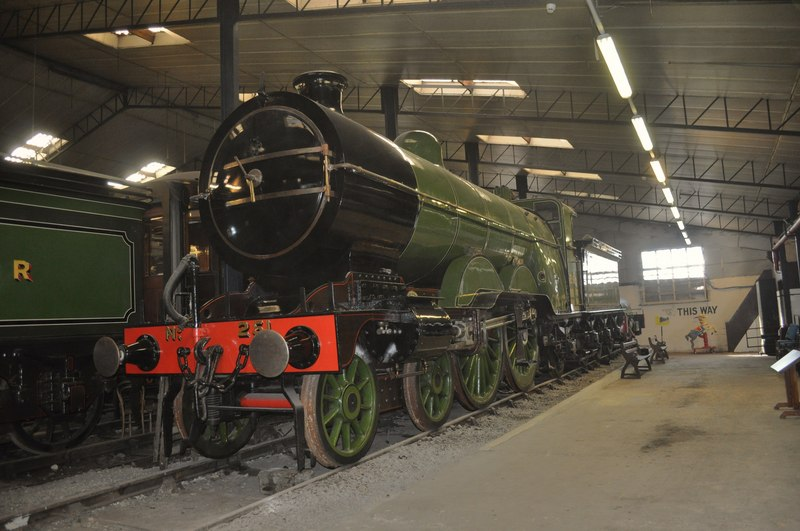
Great Northern Railway Atlantic express locomotive No. 251

The five-year premium apprenticeship with the Great Northern, which cost his father £75, taught Bentley to design complex railway machinery and also gave him practical experience in the technical procedures to cast, manufacture, and build it. He later recalled: "The sight of one of Patrick Stirling's eight-foot singles could move me profoundly." While with the Great Northern, he came close to realising his childhood ambition to drive one of their Atlantic express locomotives, when at the end of his apprenticeship he acquired footplate experience as a second fireman on main-line expresses. "My longest day", he said, "was London to Leeds and back, on the return journey doing Wakefield to King's Cross non-stop for 175 miles. This was a total day's run of 400 miles, entailing a consumption of about seven tons of coal, every pound of it to be shovelled. Not a bad day's exercise." He completed his apprenticeship in the summer of 1910 but decided that the railways did not offer him enough scope for a satisfying career.

=== Motorcycles ===
In 1909 and 1910, Bentley raced Quadrant, Rex, and Indian motorcycles. He competed in two Isle of Man Tourist Trophy races, on a Rex in 1909 and as a member of Indian's factory team in 1910. He did not finish in either event; in 1910, his Indian's rear tyre burst on the second lap.

=== Theoretical engineering study, taxi company employment ===
After he studied theoretical engineering at King's College London, he took employment with the National Motor Cab Company, where his several duties included overseeing the maintenance of the fleet's 250 Unics. He was fascinated by the cabbies' ingenuity at fiddling the meters.

=== Entering the automobile industry ===
In 1912, Bentley joined his brother, Horace Millner Bentley, in a company called "Bentley and Bentley" that sold French Doriot, Flandrin & Parant cars. Dissatisfied with the performance of the DFPs, but convinced that success in competition was the best marketing for them, Bentley was inspired by a paperweight to have pistons made for the engine in aluminium alloy. Fitted with the alloy pistons and a modified camshaft, a DFP took several records at Brooklands in 1913 and 1914.

=== Aero engines ===
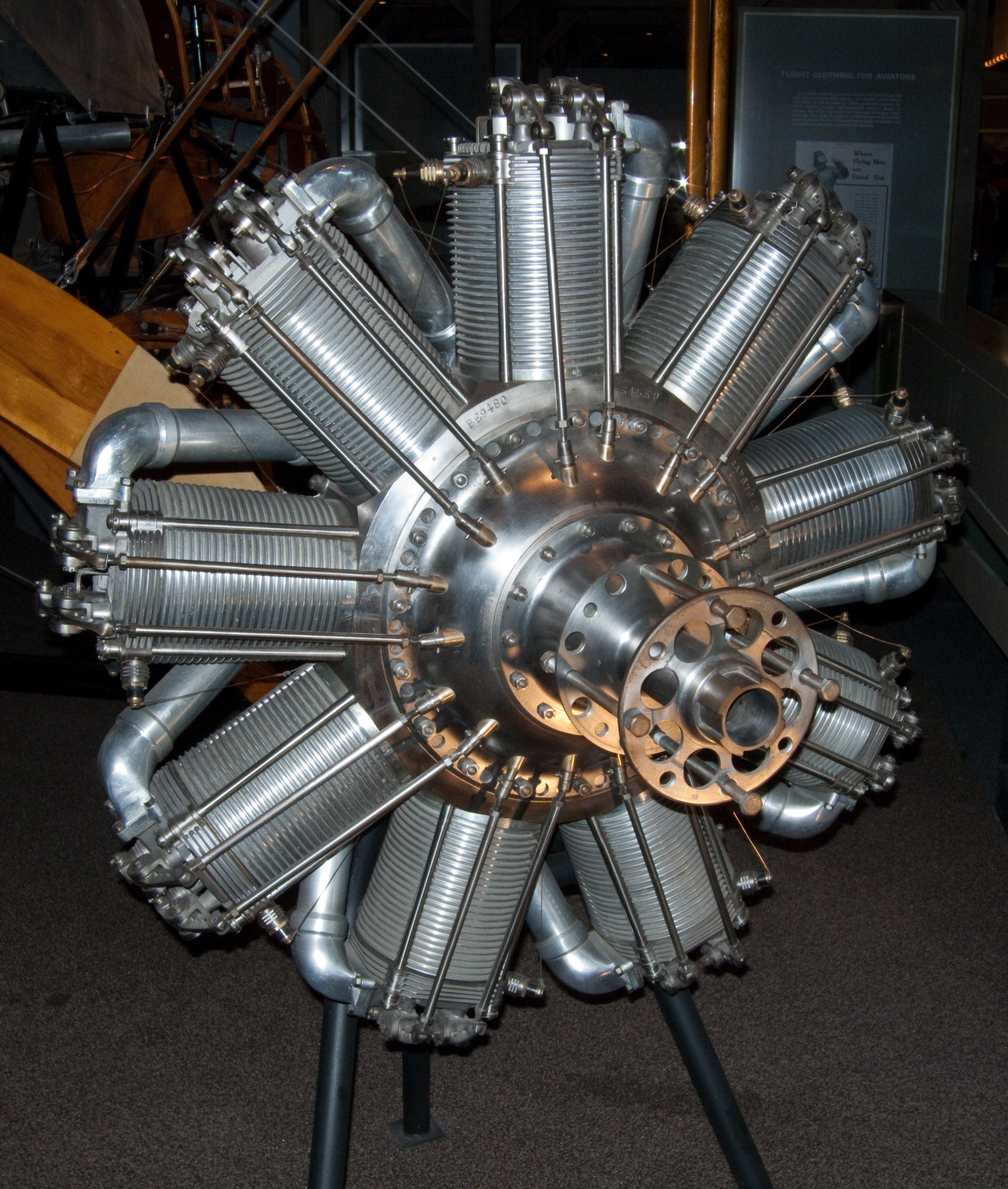
Bentley BR2 rotary engine

At the outbreak of World War I, Bentley knew that using aluminium alloy pistons in military applications would benefit the national interest: they improved power output and ran cooler, allowing higher compression ratios and higher engine speeds. As security considerations prevented his broadcasting the information to engine manufacturers, he contacted the official liaison between the manufacturers and the Navy. That man, Commander Wilfred Briggs, would be his senior officer throughout the war.

Commissioned in the Royal Naval Air Service, Bentley was sent to share with manufacturers the knowledge and experience he had gained from the modifications to the engines of the DFP cars he sold in Britain. Following his first consultation, which was with the future Lord Hives at Rolls-Royce, the company's first aero engine, named the Eagle, was designed with pistons of aluminium instead of cast-iron or steel. Bentley next visited Louis Coatalen at Sunbeam, with the result that the same innovation was used in all their aero engines.

Bentley also visited Gwynnes, whose Chiswick factory made French Clerget engines under licence, and he liaised between the squadrons in France and Gwynnes' engineering staff. When they proved unwilling to implement Bentley's more important suggestions the Navy gave him a team to design his own aero engine at the Humber factory in Coventry. Designated the BR1, Bentley Rotary 1, the engine was fundamentally different from the Clerget except in the design of the cam mechanism, which was retained to facilitate production. A prototype was running in the early summer of 1916. The bigger BR2 followed in early 1918.

In recognition, Bentley was awarded the MBE. After he was invited in 1920 to make a claim, which the Clerget licensees contested unsuccessfully, the Royal Commission on Awards to Inventors awarded him £8,000.

== Bentley Motors ==
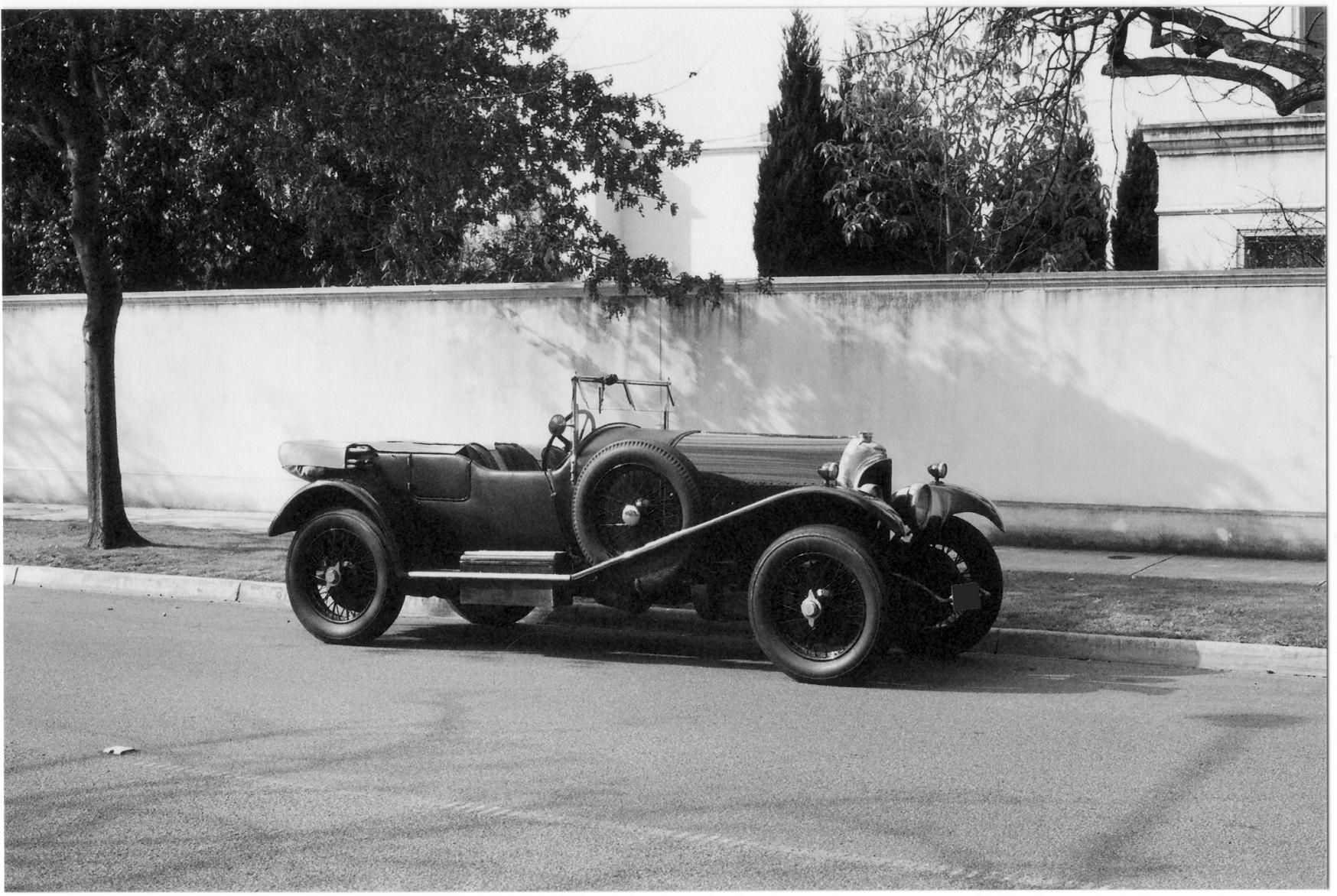
1923 Bentley 3-litre

After the war, in early 1919, Bentley founded Bentley in small premises in London with Frank Burgess (formerly of Humber) and Harry Varley (formerly of Vauxhall). Clive Gallop joined the team as an engine designer to help develop their 3,000 cubic centimetres (180 cu in) straight-4 engine. The 3-litre engine ran for the first time in New Street Mews, Baker Street, London. A plaque marks the building in what is now Chagford Street. Bentley's first complete Bentley 3 Litre car began road tests in January 1920 and the first production version, made in Cricklewood, was delivered in September 1921. Its durability earned widespread acclaim.

Bentley's motto was "To build a good car, a fast car, the best in class." His cars raced in hill climbs and at Brooklands, and the lone 3 Litre entered by the company in the 1922 Indianapolis 500 mile race and driven by Douglas Hawkes finished thirteenth at an average speed of 74.95 mph. Bentley entered a team of his new 3-litre modified and race-prepared cars in the 1922 Tourist Trophy, driving himself in Bentley III; the only team to finish, they received the Team Award, thereby launching Bentley's reputation; Jean Chassagne (later himself a 'Bentley Boy') on a 1921 Grand Prix Sunbeam winning outright. Bentleys set many records at the Le Mans 24-hour races, with "Bentley Boy" Woolf Barnato the only driver to win all three times he entered.

In 1923, when a rather sceptical Bentley was persuaded to attend the inaugural Le Mans race, he saw John Duff and Frank Clement's private entry take fourth place.

A Bentley 3 Litre won at Le Mans in 1924. Neither of the two Bentleys entered in the 1925 race finished it, but subsequent models won again in 1927, 1928, 1929, and 1930, with the factory team managed by Bentley's old school friend Richard Sidney Witchell. Ettore Bugatti is said to have commented that Bentley made "the fastest lorries in the world".

With Bentley Motors Ltd. in financial difficulties, and the company's board of directors critical of Bentley, Kimberley diamond magnate Barney Barnato's heir Woolf Barnato purchased the business's assets and became chairman.

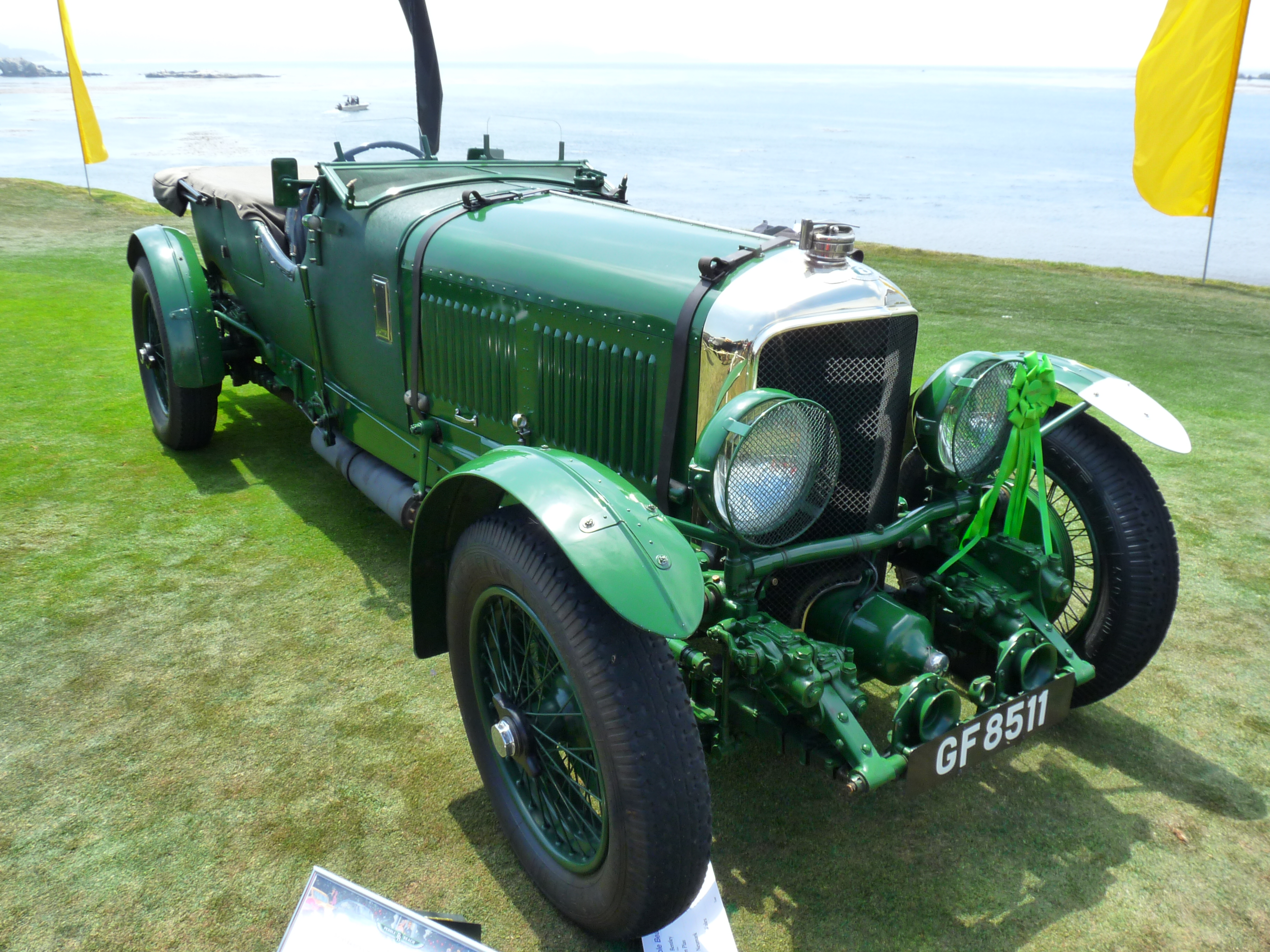
Speed Six

Bentley continued his design work as Barnato's employee. The racing version of the Bentley-designed six-cylinder Speed Six—the road car was introduced in 1928—proved to be the most successful Bentley in competition, and won Le Mans in 1929 and 1930. In 1929, against Bentley's wishes, Barnato approved the development of a supercharged, "Blower" version of the 1927 4½ Litre. Tim Birkin's brainchild, the car was made in separate, purpose-built workshops, away from Bentley, in Welwyn Garden City. As Bentley had feared, durability proved poor and the car failed on the track.

Although Barnato continued racing Bentleys with distinction, and even though the company sold a hundred of its 8 Litre model, which was launched as a grand car for the ultra-rich in October 1930 (Bugatti sold three of his equivalent model, the Royale), the Great Depression took its toll. By July 1931 Barnato's financial support had dwindled, and Bentley Motors went into voluntary liquidation. On 10 July a Receiver was appointed to the company. Bentley's company had accumulated losses of £136,220 and had worked through three fortunes including Barnato's.

With an intention of reentering the luxury motorcar business, Napier & Son entered negotiations as prospective purchasers.

The Press Association understands that Messrs Napier and Son, aero-engine builders, have reached an agreement to take over Bentley Motors Limited which is in voluntary liquidation. It is expected that the matter will come before the Court within the next few days.

— Press Association, Napier To Absorb Bentley Motors, The Times 24 October 1931 page 18

Cricklewood production

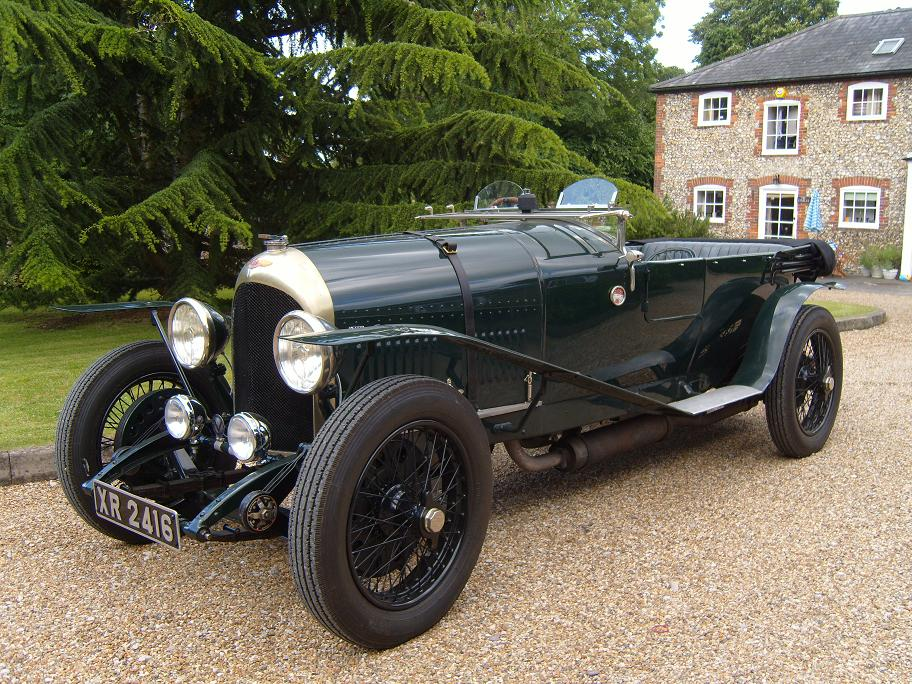
Dr Benjafield's 3-litre

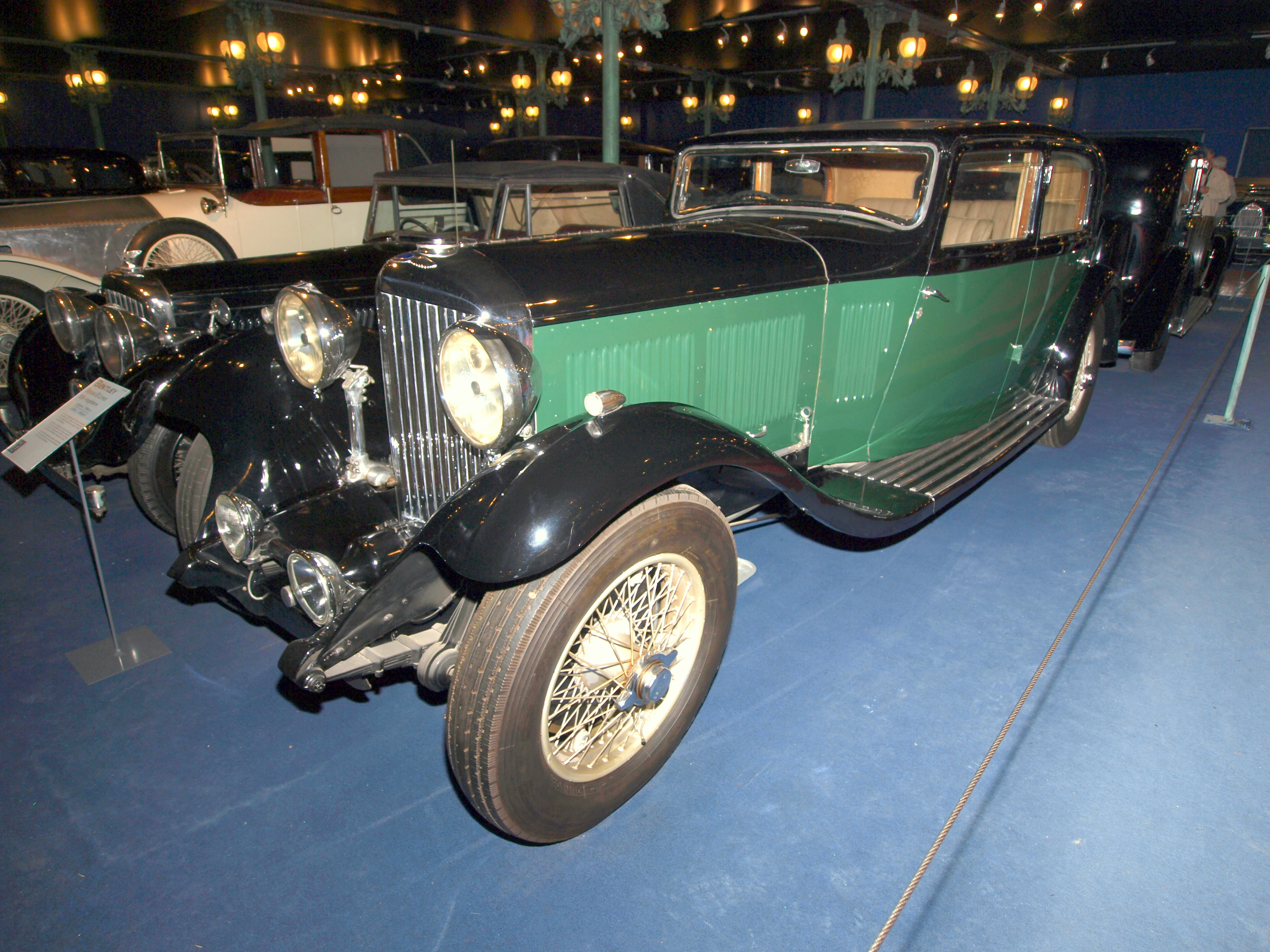
Bentley 8-litre saloon

Year	3-litre	4-litre	4 1/2-litre	6 1/2-litre	8-litre	Total
1922	145					145
1923	204					204
1924	403					403
1925	395					395
1926	295			58		353
1927	140			127		267
1928	45		273	99		417
1929	8		260	129		397
1930			138	126		264
1931		50	56		100	206
1931+	4		6			10
Total	1,639	50	733	539	100	3,061

- 506 of the 3-litre cars were 'Speed Models' and 15 '100 mph Models'
- 54 of the 4 1/2-litre cars were supercharged
- 171 of the short-chassis 6 1/2-litre cars were 'Speed Sixes'

== Rolls-Royce Limited, Derby ==
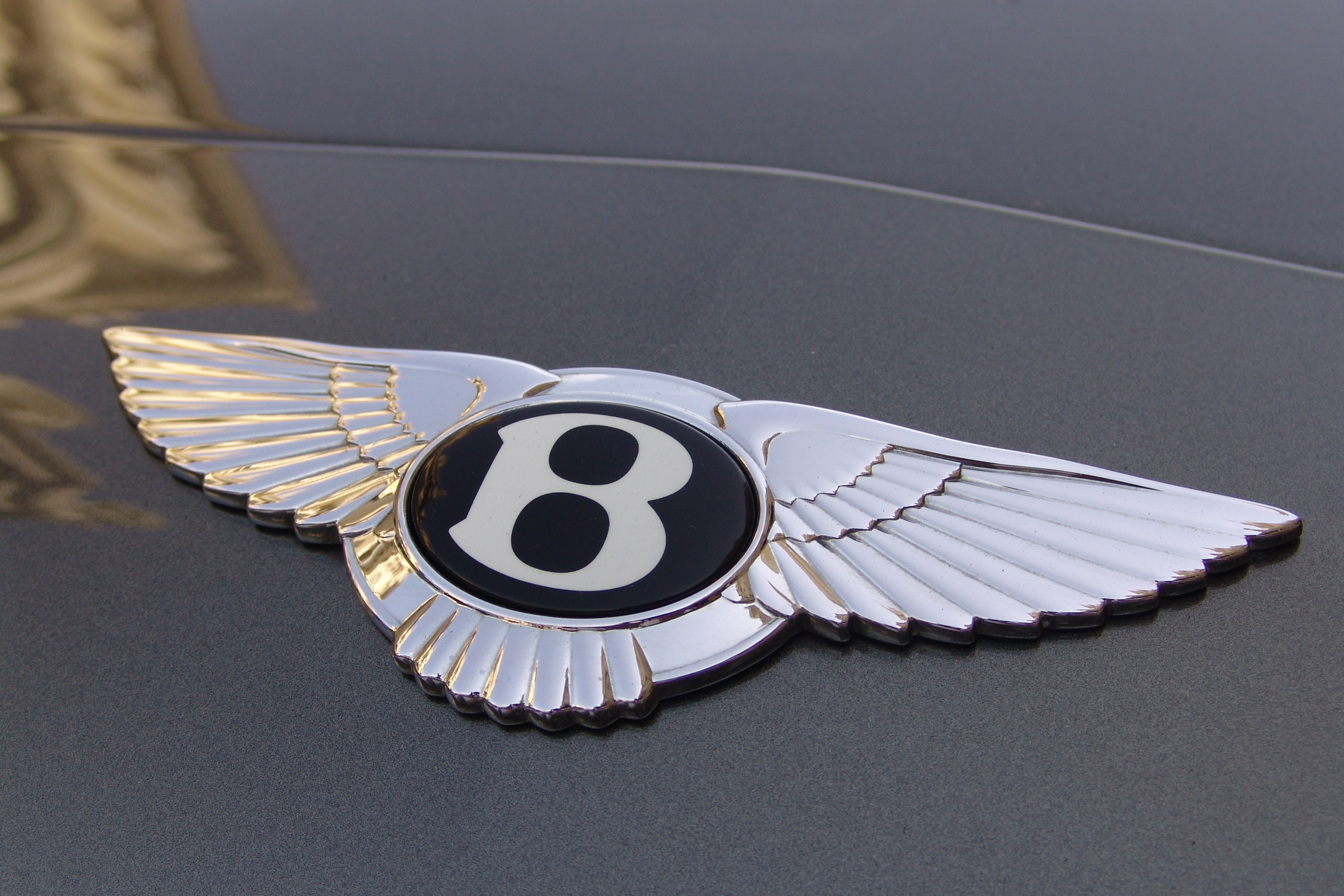
Bentley symbol

However, Bentley's arch rival Rolls-Royce had been disturbed by the 8 Litre's encroachment upon the market segment of their Phantom II. To prevent Bentley continuing as a competitor Rolls-Royce's agents made an offer, posing as the British Equitable central trust to avoid alerting Napier and inflating the price. As a result Rolls-Royce was able to buy the company, topping Napier's bid at the last minute. They announced the acquisition on 20 November 1931. Bentley described in his biography how he found out about the purchase by Rolls-Royce. His wife had returned from a cocktail party, where she overheard a man saying something which she understood to mean that his company had recently taken over Bentley. Later in the party she managed to find out from her hostess that the man’s name was Arthur Sidgreaves. “Who is he”, she asked her husband. “He’s the managing Director of Rolls-Royce”, Bentley replied.

The old business had not troubled to register their Bentley trademark; Rolls-Royce took immediate steps to remedy that omission. Cricklewood was closed during 1932. Thereafter production was from Rolls-Royce premises in Derby and, postwar, Crewe.

Rolls-Royce had acquired the Bentley showrooms in Cork Street, the service station at Kingsbury, the whole establishment at Cricklewood and Bentley himself. This last element was disputed by Napier in court, but without success. Everything was sold but some 8-litre chassis which were taken to Derby. The name alone was to be kept and used for a smaller economy car but that prototype proved to be as complex and expensive as the bigger Rolls-Royces and its development was halted.

Bentley believed Barnato had bought a substantial shareholding in Rolls-Royce just before pulling out his support while visiting New York. Barnato was invited to become a director of the new Rolls-Royce subsidiary, Bentley Motors (1931) Limited.

Bentley's winter of 1931/1932 was hard: his wife divorced him, and he lost his personal transport when he was asked to return his personal Bentley 8 Litre. Hearing of this, Lord William Rootes CEO of Rootes arranged for him to test a new Hillman each weekend.

=== Lock-out ===
As obliged to do by the court he joined Rolls-Royce under a contract extending from 1 May 1932 to the end of April 1935.

Bentley had hopes that he would be assigned his own design team within Rolls-Royce. The first meeting between Bentley and Henry Royce put an end to this illusion when Royce said “I believe you are a commercial man, Mr Bentley?” with Bentley replying “Well, not really – primarily I suppose I’m more a technical specialist.” Royce continued “You’re not an engineer then, are you?” to which Bentley reposed “I think you were a boy in the GN running sheds at Peterborough, a bit before I was a premium apprentice at Doncaster.” Rolls-Royce isolated him in London and Europe, keeping him occupied as liaison between customers and—at long range—the works, to test drive vehicles at Brooklands and for long test runs across the Continent and the Alps.

While he worked on testing the prototype he was only permitted to comment on the design of what would become the new Derby 3 1/2-litre announced in October 1933. Around that time he managed to begin to report in person to the design teams at Derby making friends in the process, among them Harry Grylls and Stewart Tresilian who did some design-only work on a short-stroke replacement for the V12 engine for their Phantom III. Bentley had been effectively sequestered from the design team of the new car bearing his own name, but he did admire their achievement.

Rolls-Royce promoted its new line of Bentleys as "The Silent Sports Car". Bentley left Rolls-Royce at the end of his contract in April 1935 with a sense of freedom.

== Lagonda, Staines, Middlesex ==
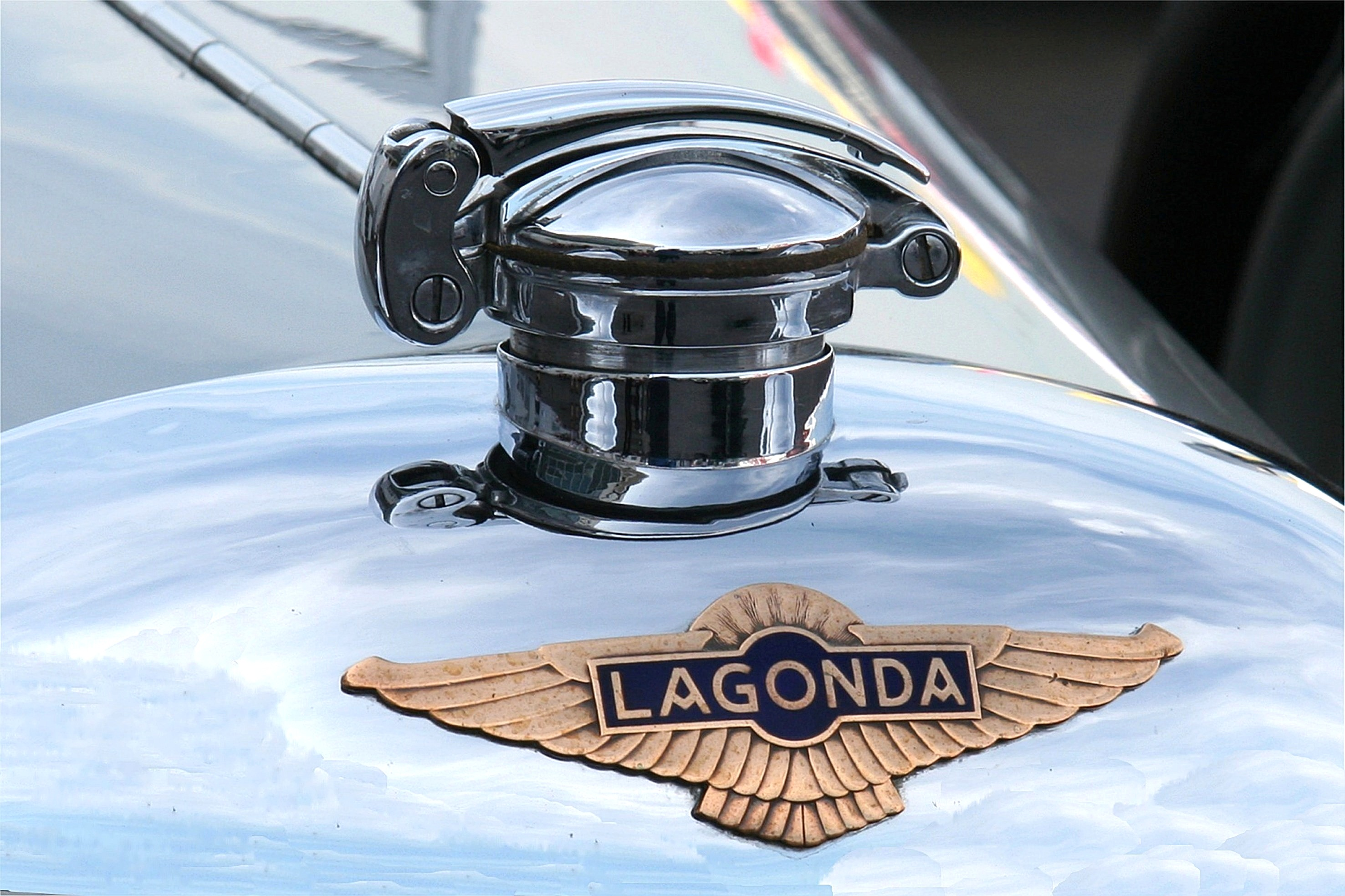

A Lagonda M45R Rapide with a Meadows engine won the 1935 Le Mans 24-hour race, and a week later Lagonda was saved from receivership by Alan P Good. The company was reformed as LG Motors (Staines) Ltd. Bentley joined the new board as Technical Director and moved to Lagonda with the majority of Rolls-Royce's racing department staff. Bentley again went racing. Unable to persuade Harry Grylls to join his engineering staff at Staines, Bentley obtained Stewart Tresilian's services from February 1936. Tresilian brought Frank Stark and Reg Ingham with him and Donald Bastow joined them.

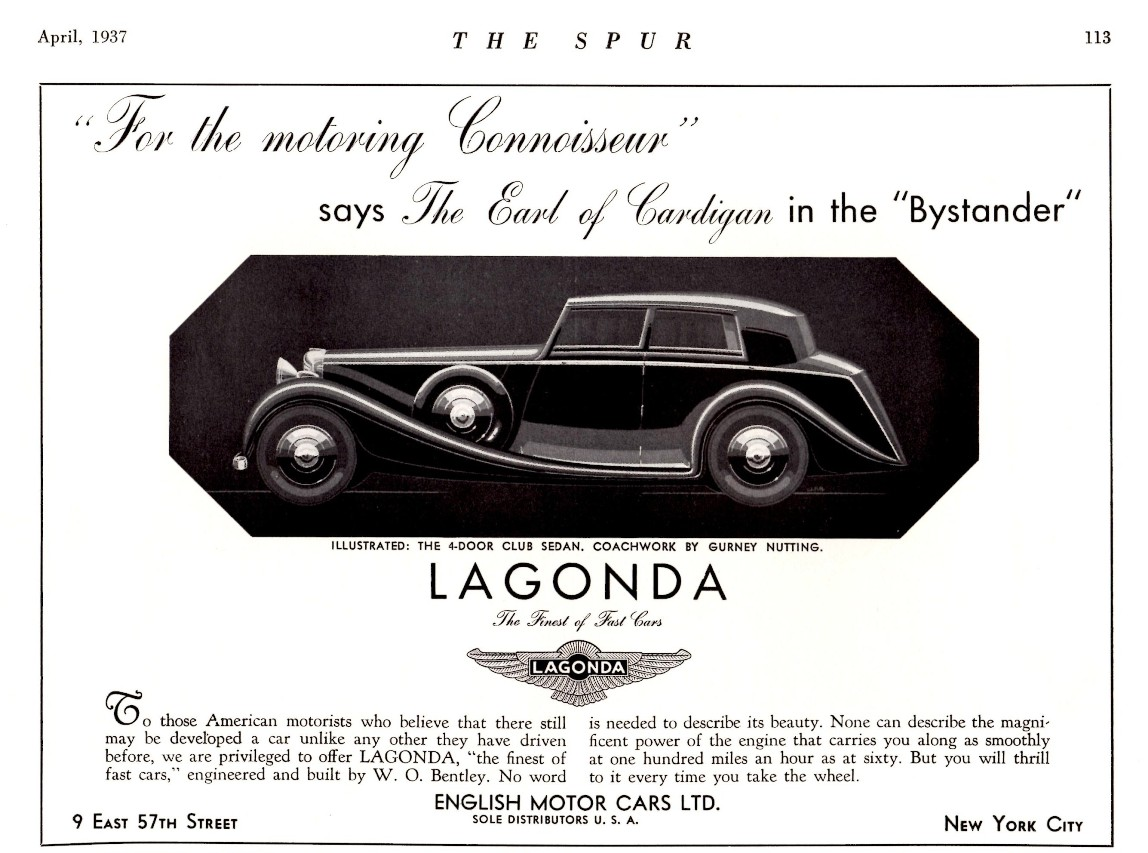
U S advertising 1937

The first product of the new company was the Lagonda LG45, Bentley's development of the Meadows-engined M45, now with power increased to 128 bhp (95 kW).

Bentley made Tresilian chief designer of the V12 engine project, and the engine was launched in 1937. Displacing 4480 cc, it delivered 180 bhp (134 kW) and was said to be capable of going from 7 to 105 mph (11 to 169 km/h) in top gear, and revving to 5000 rpm. Tresilian left in early 1938 for a Hawker Siddeley subsidiary. Development of the Lagonda V12 was not complete but Lagonda's financial difficulties prompted more staff to leave.

The car was exhibited at the 1939 New York Motor Show. The New York Times commented: "The highest price car in the show this year is tagged $8,900. It is a Lagonda, known as the "Rapide" model, imported from England. The power plant is a twelve-cylinder V engine developing 200 horsepower."

During the war Bentley worked on armaments at Lagonda. Towards the end of the war he began work on a new straight-6 engine, as it was clear that the V12 would be seen as too extravagant for the postwar market. The team developed a modern dual overhead cam straight-6 engine with an initial displacement of 2.6 L (2,580 cc; 157.4 cu in). With a 78.0 mm (3.071 in) bore and 90.0 mm (3.543 in) stroke, it produced about 105 bhp (78 kW) with dual SU carburettors. It would not reach the market until 1948.

Due to a shortage of materials, the Ministry of Supply, whose wartime controls over the allocation of steel would remain in force from 1945 to 1954, had allocated Lagonda the steel for only 100 cars. Although the Ministry's controls were intended to maintain supply to existing manufacturers, they were applied unevenly—while Lagonda had tooled up for quantity production and provided evidence of a substantial export order book, David Brown's companies were able to obtain the steel they required. One consequence of the controls was that aluminium was used in the construction of Land Rovers, winning them an unintended reputation for not rusting.

In August, 1947, J. R. Greenwood, Chairman of Lagonda, announced that although work had begun on the first 1,000 of the new Bentley-designed 2 1/2-litre cars, the project had been cancelled owing to continuing production difficulties and the recently imposed double purchase tax. While Lagonda would continue with its other engineering activities, including the manufacture of a diesel-powered pile-driver, the company notified its 1,600 workers that some of them would inevitably become redundant.

Lagondas engineered by W. O. Bentley
Lagonda LG45 4½-litre tourer (1937)

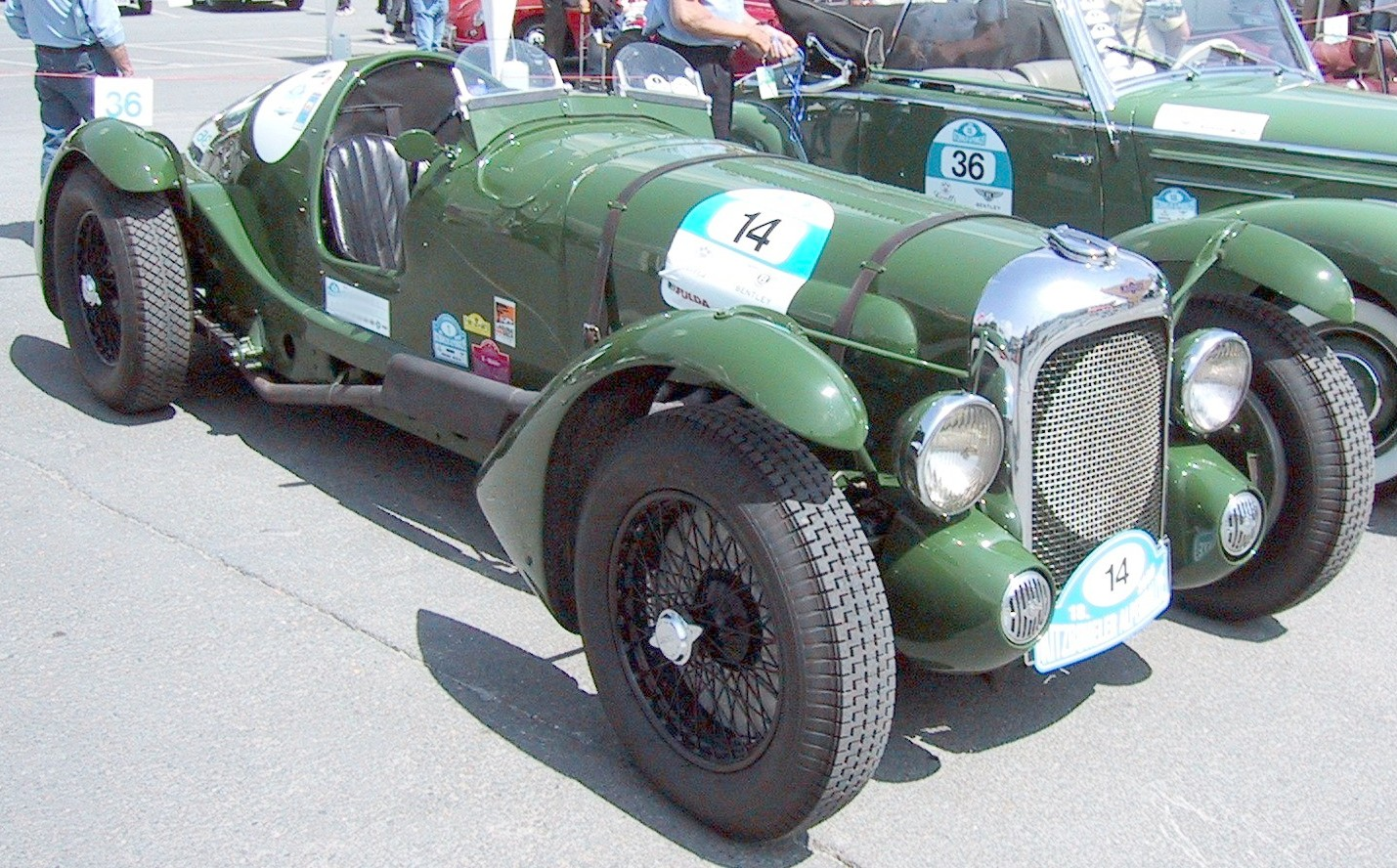
Lagonda V12 for Le Mans 1938

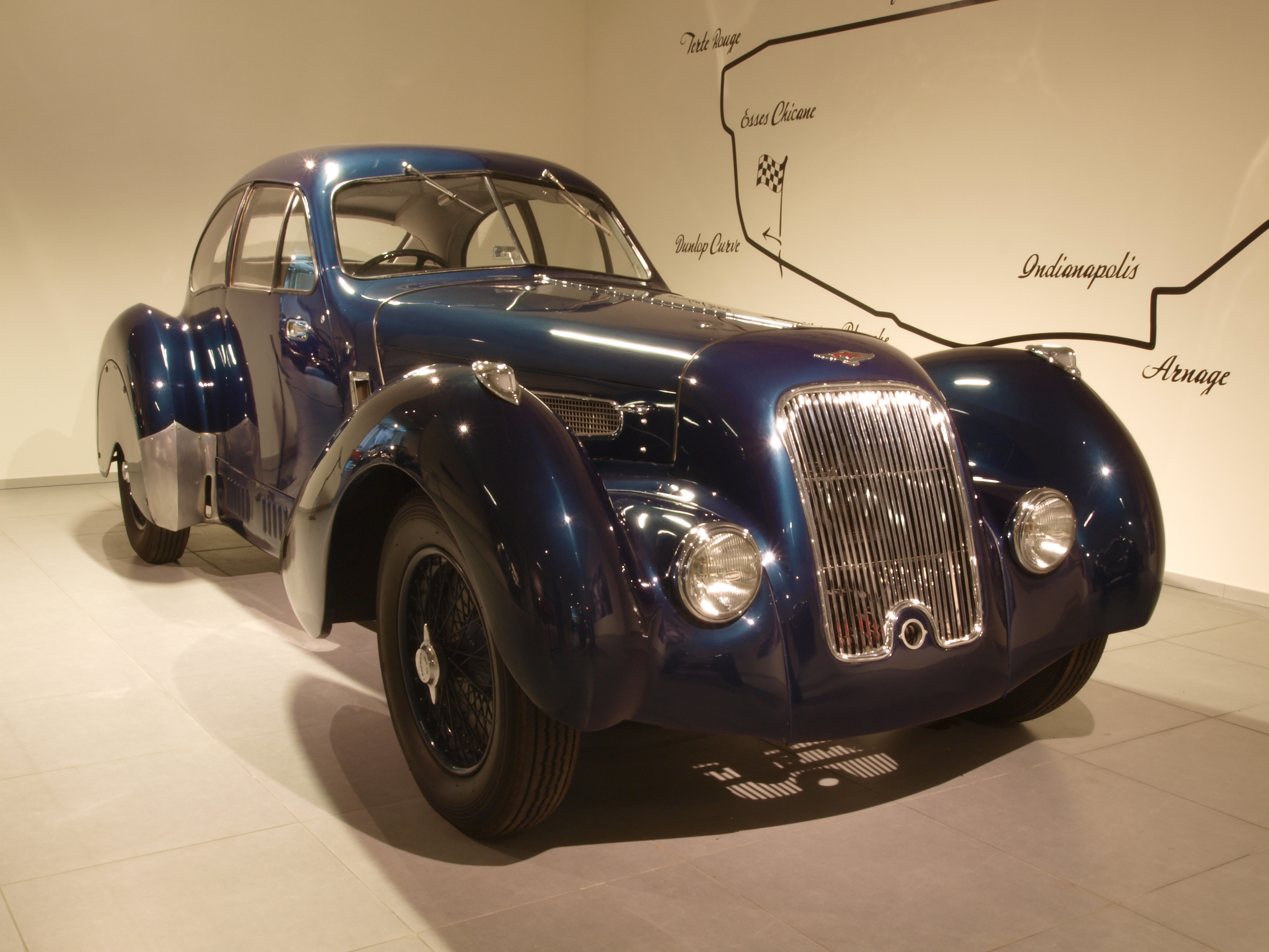
Lagonda V12 Lancefield coupé

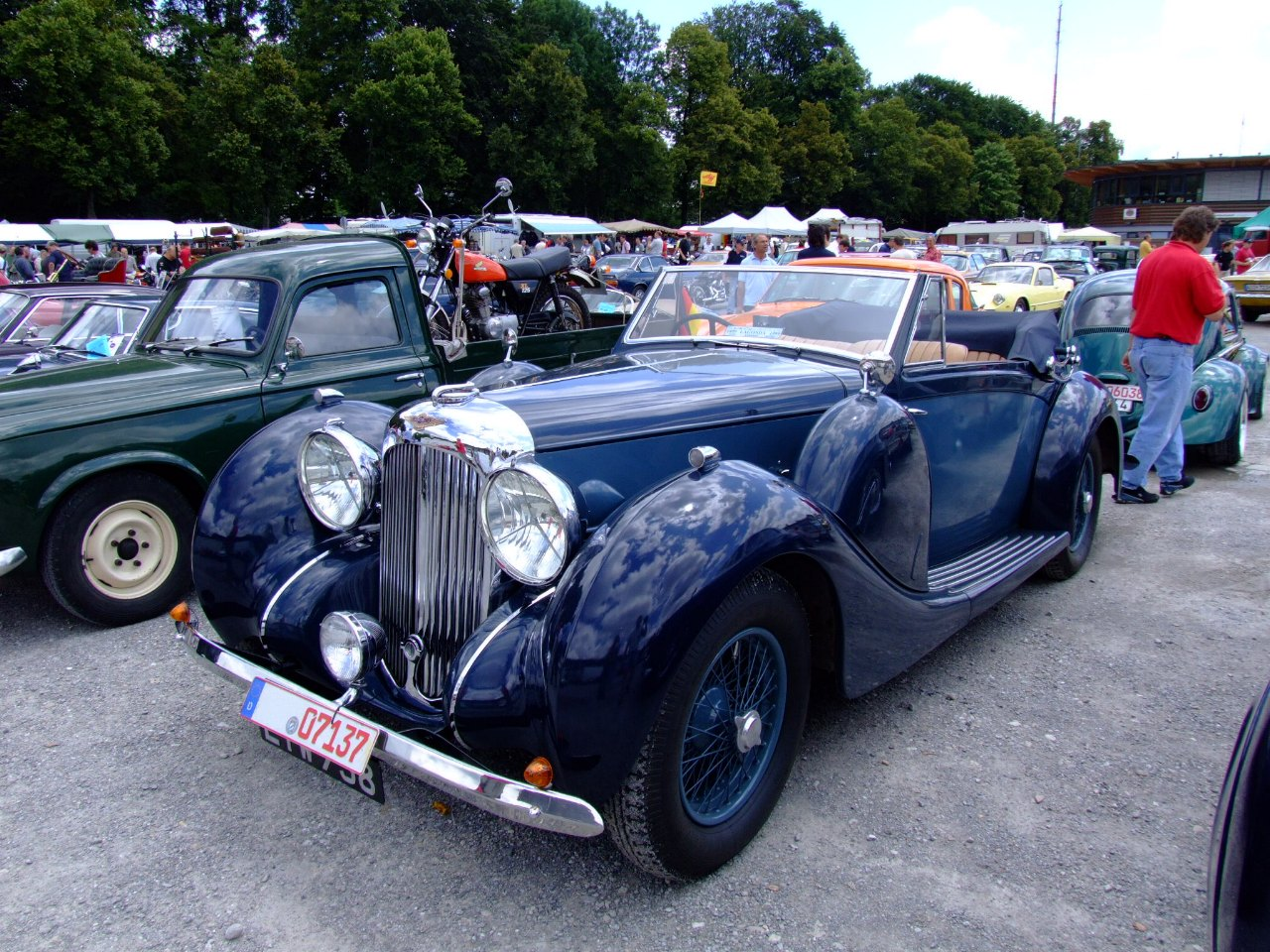
Lagonda V12 drophead coupé, body designed by Frank Feeley

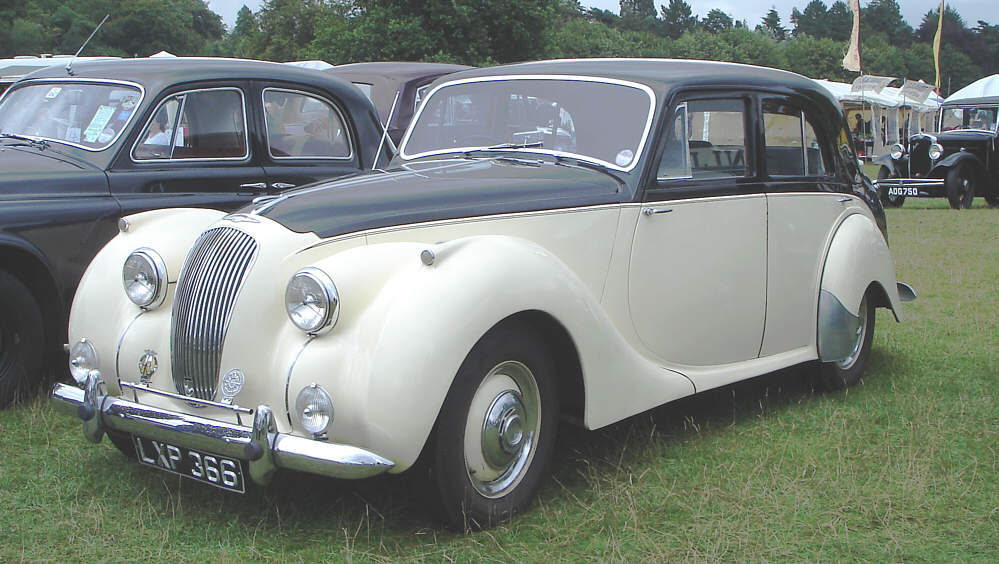
Lagonda 2.6-litre straight-six saloon

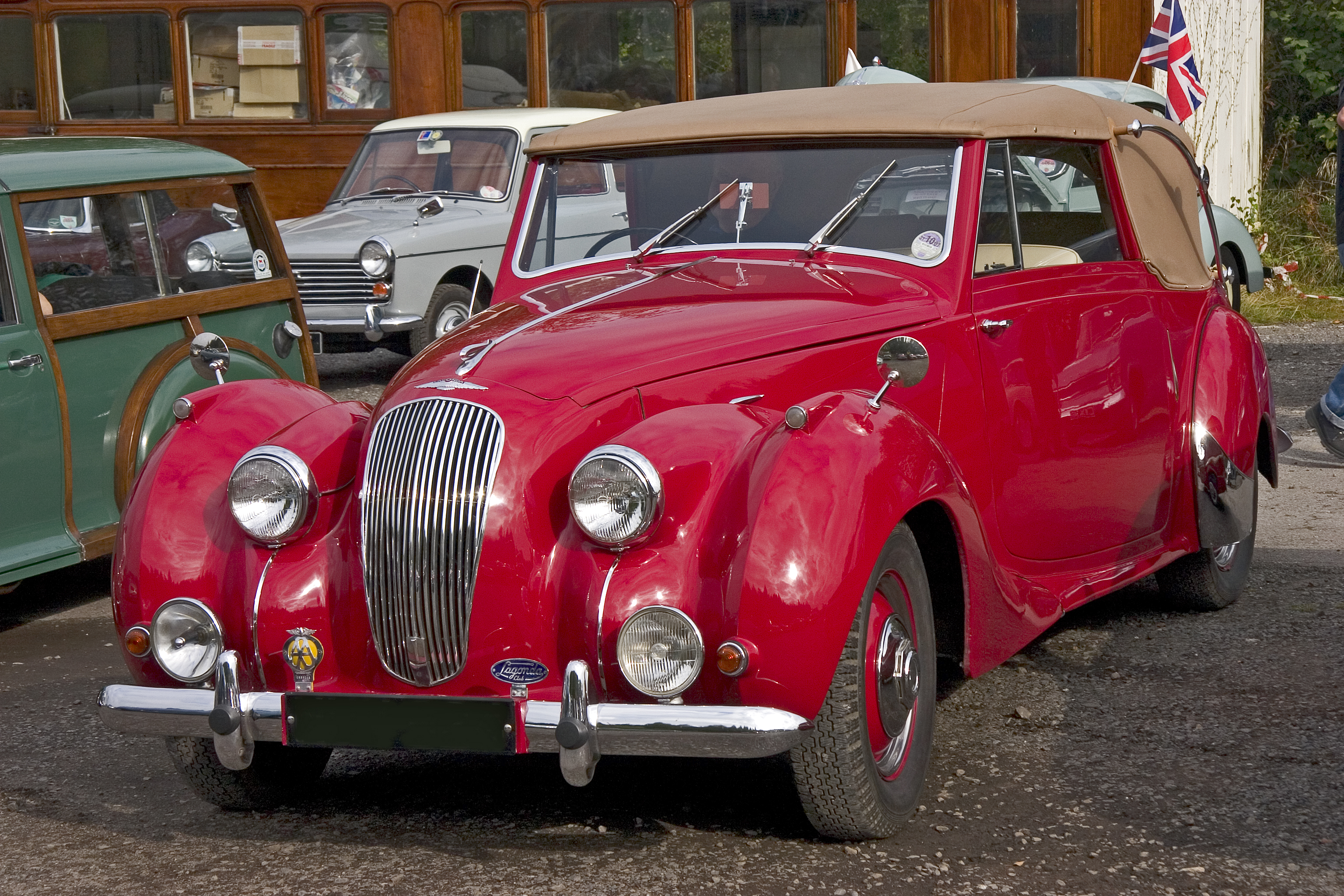
Lagonda 2.6-litre straight-six drophead coupé

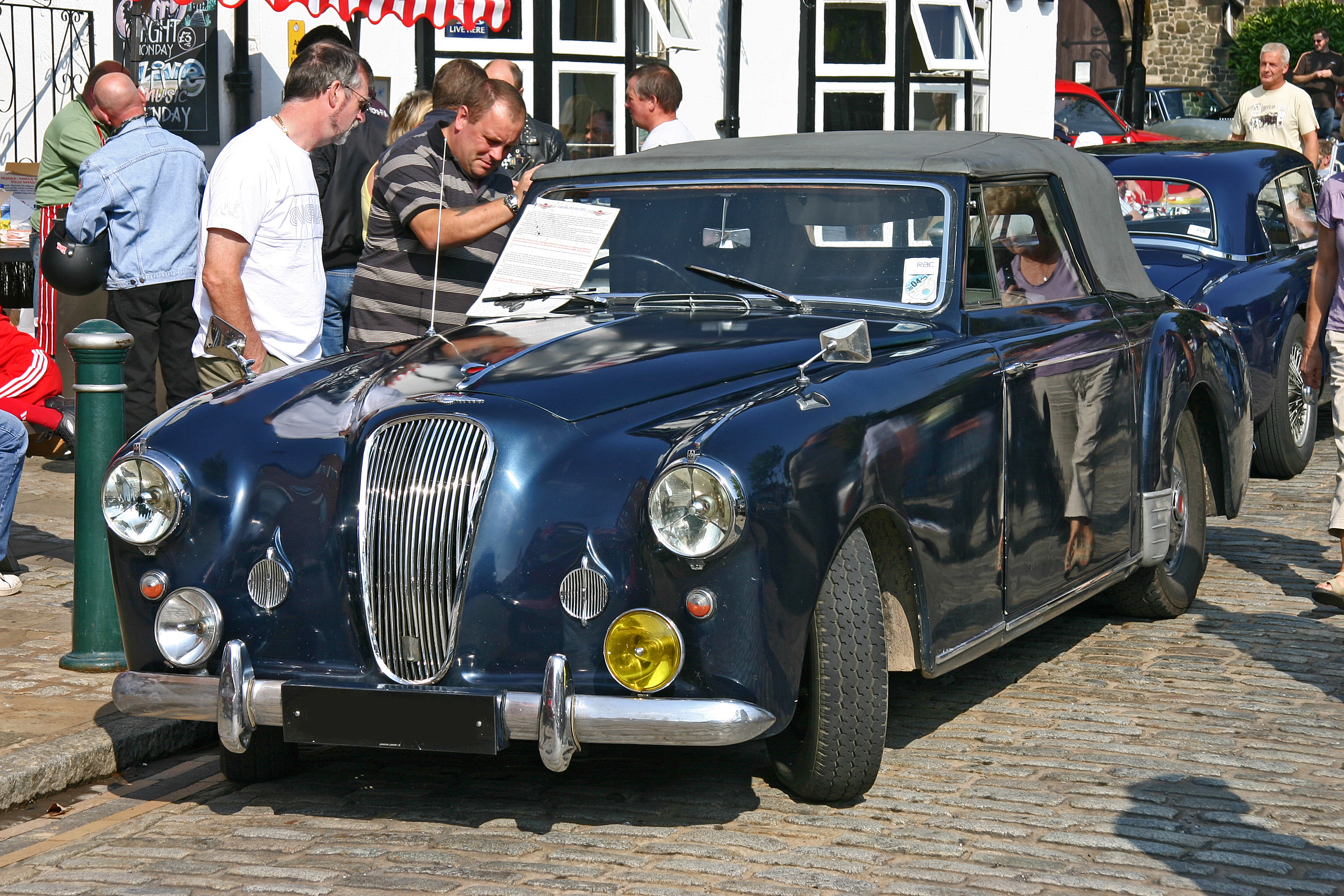
Lagonda 3-litre straight-six drophead coupé, coachwork by Graber for Peter Ustinov

== David Brown, Feltham, Middlesex ==
A month later, in mid-September it was announced that the Lagonda specification had been bought by David Brown & Sons (Huddersfield) Limited, gear-wheel manufacturer, which would combine production with Aston Martin bought earlier that year. Production was moved to Feltham, Middlesex.

Brown had purchased Lagonda largely to gain Bentley's engineering expertise, and immediately placed Bentley 's newest creation, his 2.6-litre Lagonda Straight-6 engine, under the bonnet of Brown's other new acquisition, the Frank Feeley-designed Aston Martin DB2. This durable DOHC engine would continue in Lagondas and Aston Martins until 1959 and, Bentley noted, important design details were carried on through to their V8.

Aston Martins engineered by W. O. Bentley
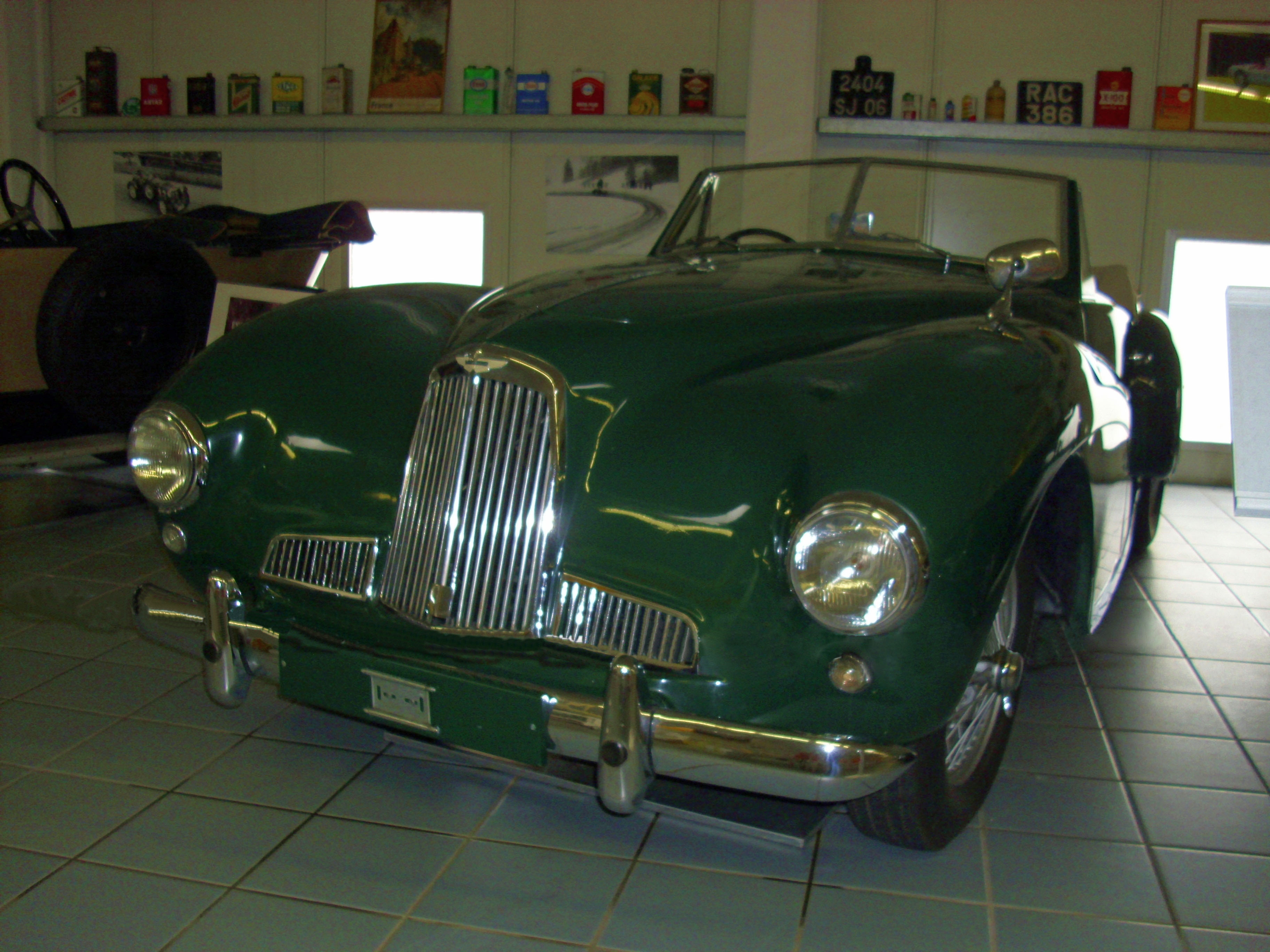
Aston Martin drophead coupé 2-Litre Sports 1950

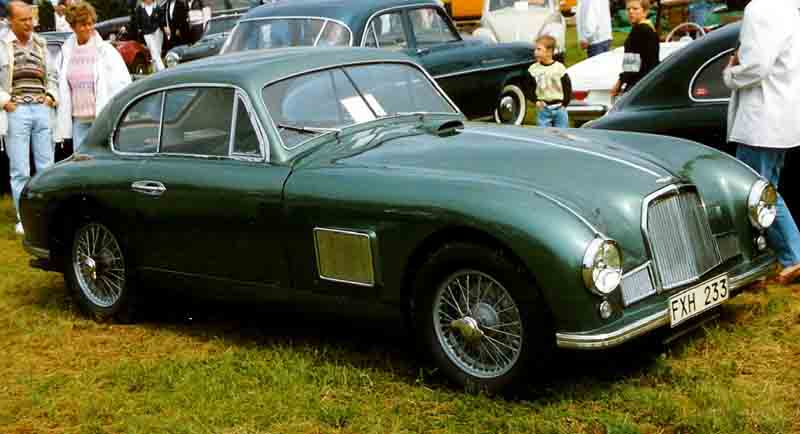
Aston Martin sports saloon 2.6-litre DB2 1950

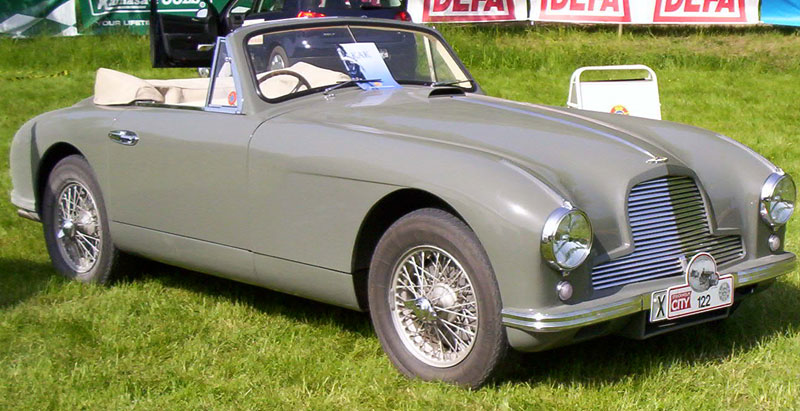
Aston Martin drophead coupé 2.6-litre DB2 1951

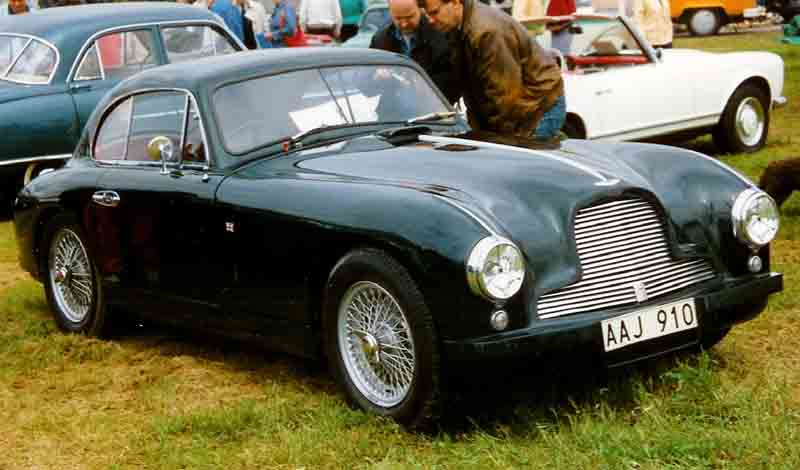
Aston Martin sports saloon 2.6-litre DB2 1952

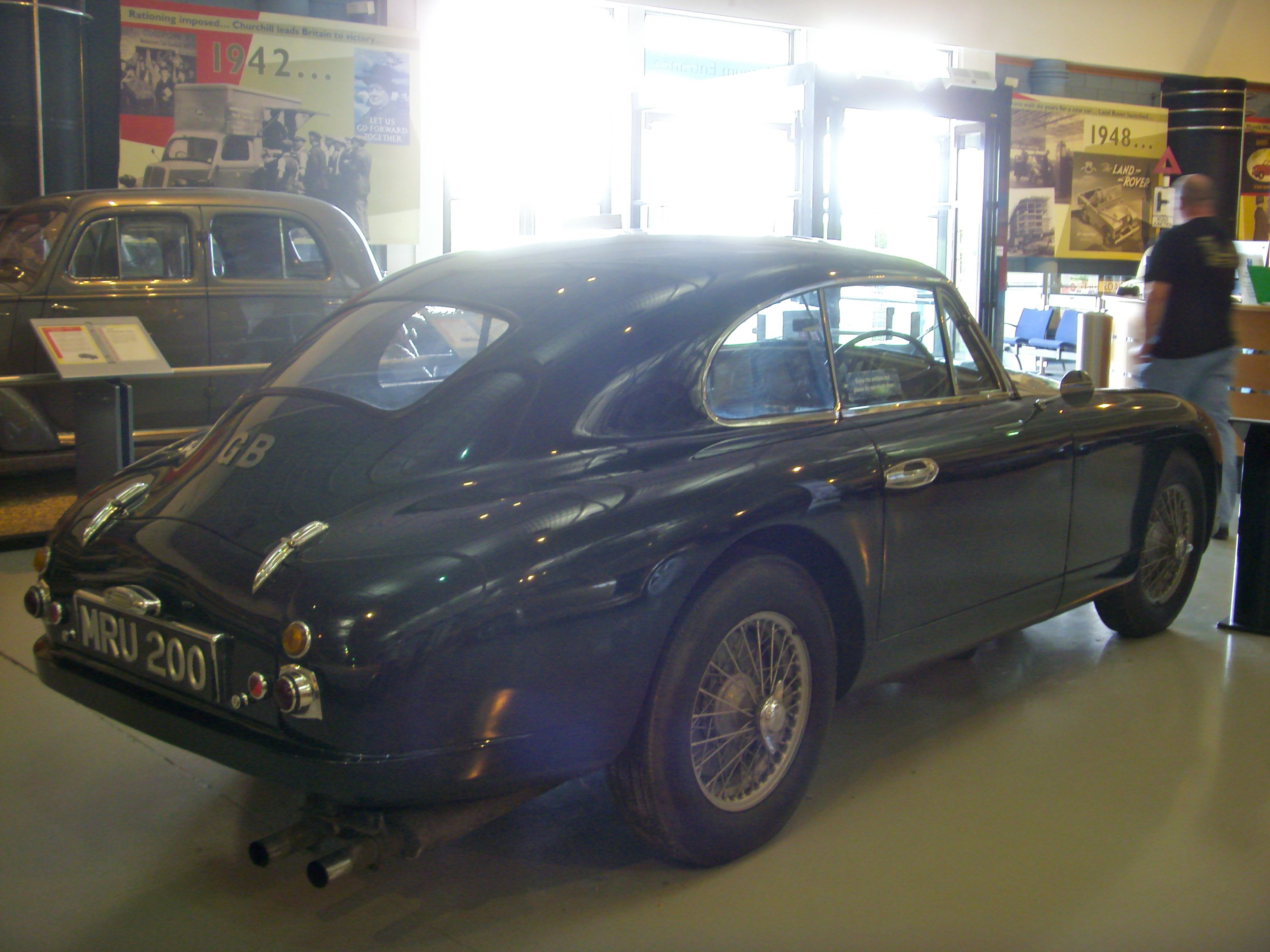
Aston Martin 2.6-litre DB2 1952

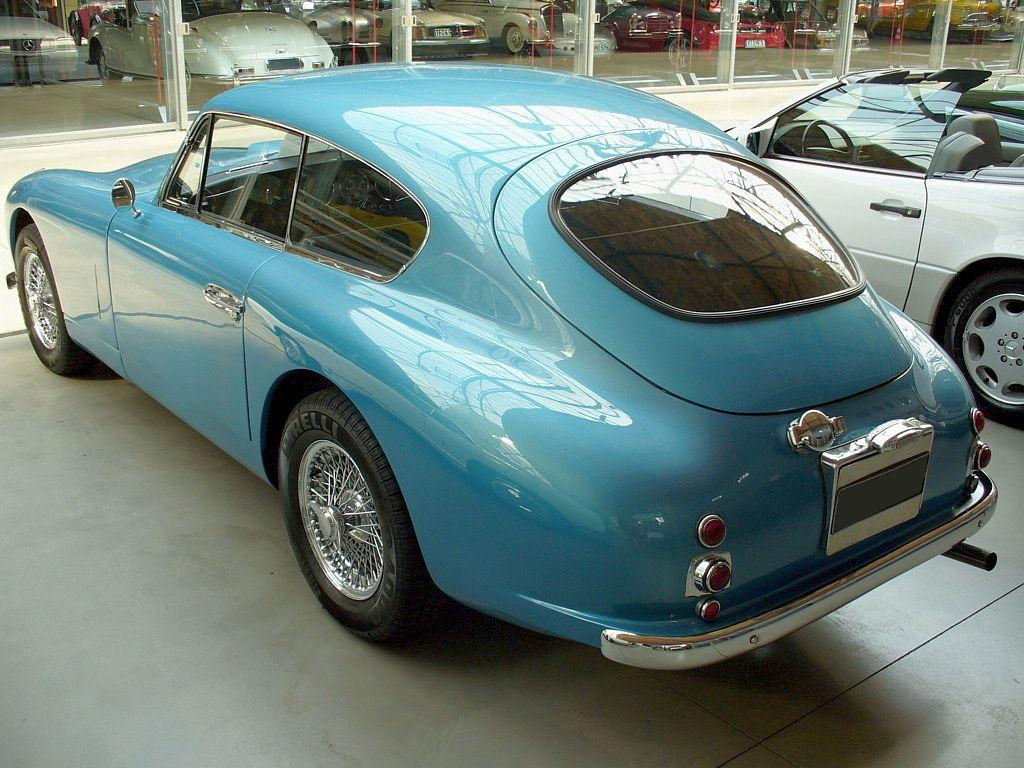
Aston Martin 3.0-litre DB2-4 Mark I

== Armstrong Siddeley ==
Bentley moved from Aston Martin-Lagonda to Armstrong Siddeley, where he designed another twin-overhead-cam 3-litre engine before retiring. His team included Donald Bastow. According to one report, the team's responsibility for the Sapphire project extended to the car's chassis, but by the time their work ended in 1949 they had contributed little more than detailed inspiration for the production version of the car that was announced in October 1952. Although Bentley's particular engine design was judged too costly for production, it was because of his involvement that the final Sapphire product received the respect of contemporary designers.

Armstrong Siddeleys engineered by W. O. Bentley
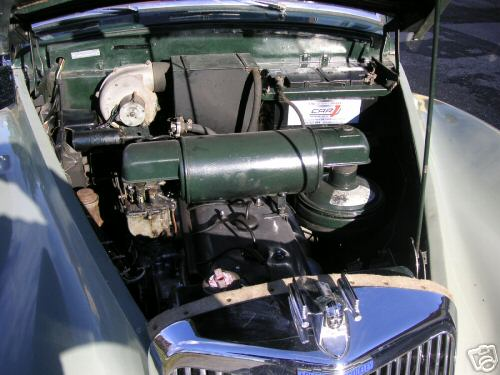
Armstrong Siddeley Sapphire engine

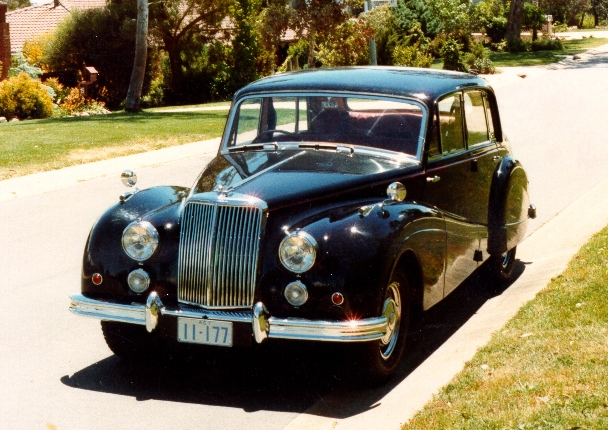
Armstrong Siddeley Sapphire

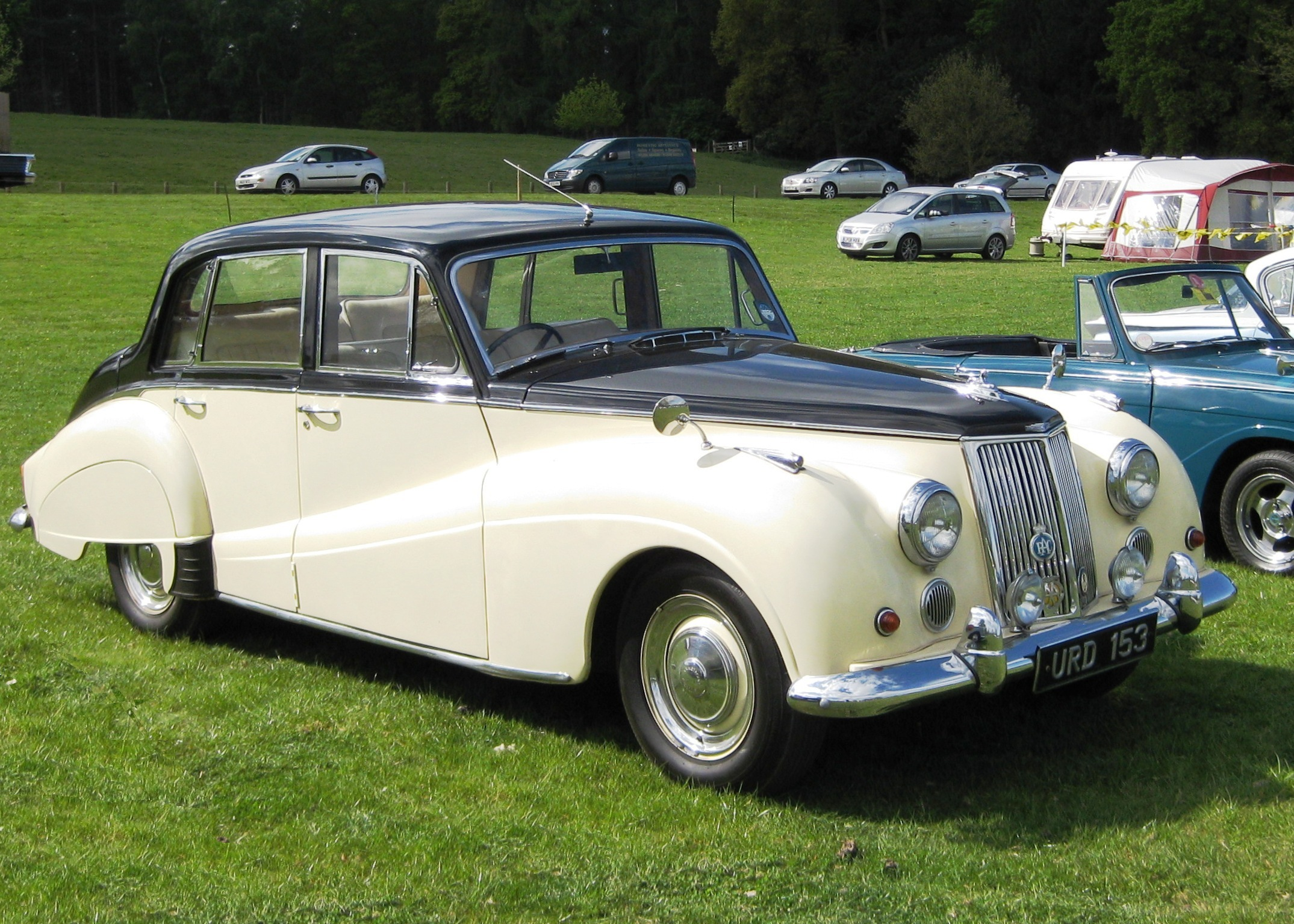
Armstrong Siddeley Star Sapphire

== Personal life ==
Bentley married three times and had no children. In 1914, he married Leonie Gore, daughter of Sir St George Ralph Gore, ninth baronet of Magherabegg. She died in the Spanish flu epidemic in 1919. In 1920, Bentley married Poppy (Audrey Hutchinson) (1895-1981), a fun-loving society woman who disliked factories (Bentley was said to love spending time in the workshop). They divorced soon after the business was sold in 1931. In 1934 Bentley married Margaret Roberts Hutton, née Murray; Margaret survived him by some 18 years.

Bentley died on Friday, 13 August 1971, shortly before his 83rd birthday, in Woking, Surrey. The 82 year old was, from 1947 until his death in 1971, patron of The Bentley Drivers' Club.

Bentley was inducted into the Automotive Hall of Fame in 1995.

== Obituaries ==
The Times printed a lengthy obituary on 16 August 1971. The same newspaper then printed two more contributions over the following week:

"... In the eyes of those who own, have owned, or aspire to own, one of the 3,040 Bentley cars designed and built by the 'old' Bentley company under the leadership of "W. O." he was admired and respected—indeed, I think, loved is not too strong a word—for to know his cars was to know him. During his working life "W. O." suffered a series of ups and downs which might have broken a lesser man. It certainly marked him and it was a disillusioned "W. O." I first met 25 years ago [1946].

... "W. O." has said that the pleasure he derived in the post-war years from Club activities; from making new friends among its members; and from seeing the loving care bestowed upon 'his' cars has more than compensated for all his earlier disappointments."

-- S. S.

The six years during which I worked for "W. O." were a period of education and pleasure. His modesty, lack of pretension, mental honesty and reasonableness endeared him to those in contact with him, and his over-riding interest in the improvement of the car provided the education in a period which included the post-war 2 1/2-litre Lagonda development, schemes for 4 and 8 cylinder derivatives, for the pursuit of shorter strokes in engines, for a small transverse-engined front wheel drive car and for a performance engine for the Morris Minor in place of the 850cc side valve engine it then endured.

Though normally of reflective habit his experience showed him when swift action was necessary, and he could be very determined in pursuing it. Big enough to admit mistakes when they had occurred, he also knew when to modify and when to start afresh in remedying them. It is a pity that circumstances prevented his influence on car development from being greater than it was. Though motoring and motor cars were his life he retained a keen interest in locomotives."

-- Mr Donald Bastow.

== The Bentley Drivers' Club ==
Woolf Barnato (1895–1948) served a term as president. Bentley agreed to become patron in 1947. Founded in 1936 the club now has nearly 4,000 members throughout the United Kingdom, Europe, US, Canada, Southern Africa, Australia, New Zealand and Japan.

A new website was set up, www.wobentley.club, that contains the archive of all current data related to known (and unknown) Bentleys in existence, with photographs and documents about each car's history.

== Bibliography ==
- Bentley, W. O. (1969). My Life and My Cars. Cranbury, New Jersey: A.S. Barnes. ISBN 0-498-07342-4.
- Bobbitt, Malcolm (2003). Bentley: The Man behind the Marque. Derby, United Kingdom: Breedon Books. ISBN 1-85983-352-7.
- Parissien, Steven (2013). The Life of the Automobile - A New History of the Motor Car (Hardback). London: Atlantic Books. ISBN 978-1-8488-7705-4.
- Reese, Peter (2022). Sir Henry Royce: Establishing Rolls-Royce, from Motor Cars to Aero Engines (Softcover). Cheltenham, Gloucestershire: The History Press. ISBN 978-0-7509-9900-7.
