= Aston Martin DB2 =

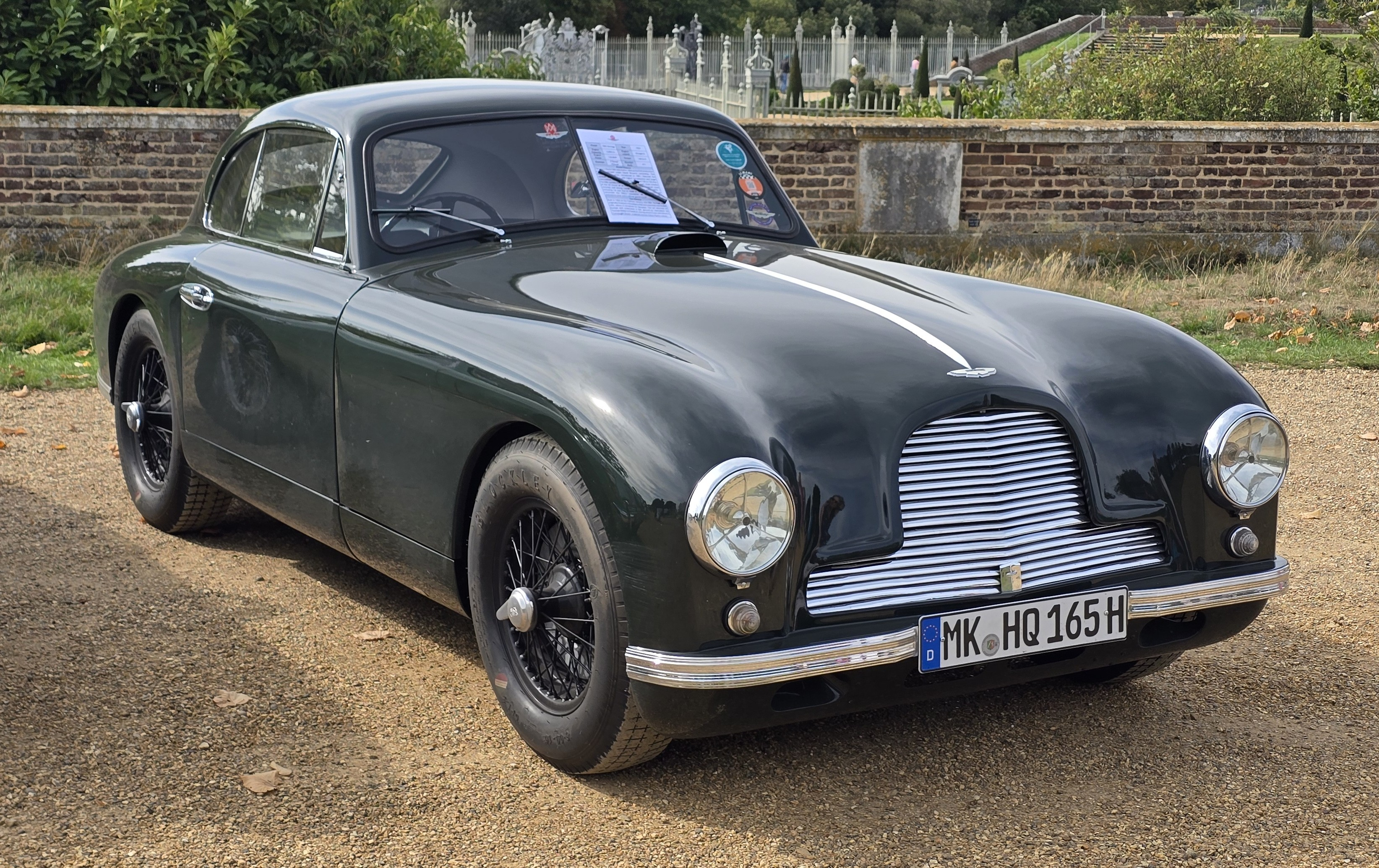
- Aston Martin DB2 Coupé

Overview
- Manufacturer: Aston Martin
- Production: May 1950 – April 1953; 411 produced
- Designer: Frank Feeley

Body and chassis
- Class: Grand tourer
- Body style: 2-seat coupé; 2-seat drophead coupé
- Layout: FR layout
- Related: Aston Martin DB3

Powertrain
- Engine: 2.6 L Lagonda I6

Dimensions
- Wheelbase: 99 in (2,500 mm)
- Length: 162.5 in (4,130 mm)
- Width: 65 in (1,700 mm)
- Height: 53.5 in (1,360 mm)

Chronology
- Predecessor: 2-Litre Sports "DB1"
- Successor: Aston Martin DB2/4

The Aston Martin DB2 is a grand tourer that was sold by Aston Martin from May 1950 until April 1953. The successor to the 2-Litre Sports model (retroactively referred to as the DB1), it had a comparatively advanced dual overhead cam 2.6 L Lagonda straight-six engine in place of the previous pushrod four-cylinder. It was available as a closed, 2-seater coupé which Aston Martin called a sports saloon, and later also as a drophead coupé, which accounted for a quarter of the model's total sales. The closed version had some success in racing.

== Development and racing ==
In 1947 David Brown bought the Aston Martin and Lagonda companies and incorporated them as Aston Martin Lagonda Ltd. Lagonda's 2.6 L (2580 cc/157 in^{3}), dual overhead cam, straight-six engine, more powerful than the pushrod 2.0 L straight-four in the Aston Martin 2-Litre Sports, was the main objective in Brown's acquisition of the company. W. O. Bentley had supervised the engine's design, which was largely by William (Willie) Watson, an engineer with the pre-war Invicta company who had collaborated on Lagonda's pre-war V12 and also designed the short-lived post-war version.

In its original form the Lagonda straight-6 had a 78 mm (3.07 in) bore and 90 mm (3.543 in) stroke, and produced about 105 hp (78 kW) with dual SU carburettors. The DB2 utilized it in a shortened version of the tube-frame chassis designed by Claude Hill for the Aston Martin 2-Litre Sports, with a fastback coupé body designed by Frank Feeley.

Three pre-production cars were entered for the 1949 24 Hours of Le Mans. One, which would become the development car for the production DB2, had the Lagonda straight-6, while the four-cylinder Aston Martin 2-litre unit powered the other two. After six laps the Lagonda-powered car, driven by Leslie Johnson, retired with overheating caused by failure of the water pump. One of the 2-litre cars was in 4th place and running without brakes when it crashed two hours short of the finish, fatally injuring driver Pierre Maréchal. The other finished 7th, crewed by Arthur Jones and Nick Haines. A month later, the larger-engined car, driven by Leslie Johnson and Charles Brackenbury, finished 3rd in the Spa 24-hour race, where one of the 2-litre cars was driven to 5th by Nick Haines and Lance Macklin.

For 1950 all three factory team cars were equipped with the Lagonda engine. At the 1950 Le Mans race the one driven by George Abecassis and Lance Macklin finished 5th, with Brackenbury and Reg Parnell bringing another home 6th, which won Aston Martin 1st and 2nd in the 3-litre class. Across the Atlantic, Briggs Cunningham drove his DB2 to 2nd in its class at the inaugural Sebring race meeting in December 1950. The factory team cars continued racing in Europe throughout 1951, including at Le Mans, where Macklin and Eric Thompson took 3rd overall, with Abecassis and Brian Shawe-Taylor 5th.

David Brown soon embarked on a series of Aston Martins designed specifically for competition use, starting with the DB3.

== Production ==
The DB2 debuted at the New York Auto Show in April 1950 and continued in production until April 1953, by which time 411 had been made. The first 49 had a chrome-framed front grille in three separate parts, and large rectangular cooling vents in the front wings. Subsequent cars had a one-piece grille with horizontal chrome slats, and no side vents.

The single-piece bonnet was hinged at the front. At the rear of the fixed-head coupé (FHC) a small top-hinged lid gave access to the spare wheel, and luggage space was behind the front seats, accessible only from inside the car.

Later in 1950, a Drophead Coupé (DHC) variant was introduced. At least 102 were built.

In April 1950, an engine with larger carburettors, inlet camshaft the same as the exhaust (for increased duration), and higher compression ratio pistons (8.16:1) was made available. Aston Martin's first Vantage upgrade option, it offered 125 hp (93 kW). Initially the higher compression ratio made the engine unsuitable for the British market, as the postwar austerity measures of the early 1950s restricted UK vehicles to 72 octane "Pool petrol". The first DB2 Vantage, LML 50/21, was delivered to, and raced by, Briggs Cunningham in the United States.

== Performance ==
A closed coupé tested by the British magazine The Motor in 1950 had a top speed of 116.4 mph (187.3 km/h) and could accelerate from 0-60 mph (97 km/h) in 11.2 seconds. A fuel consumption of 20 miles per imperial gallon (14 L/100 km; 17 mpg_{‑US}) was recorded. The test car cost £1914 including taxes.

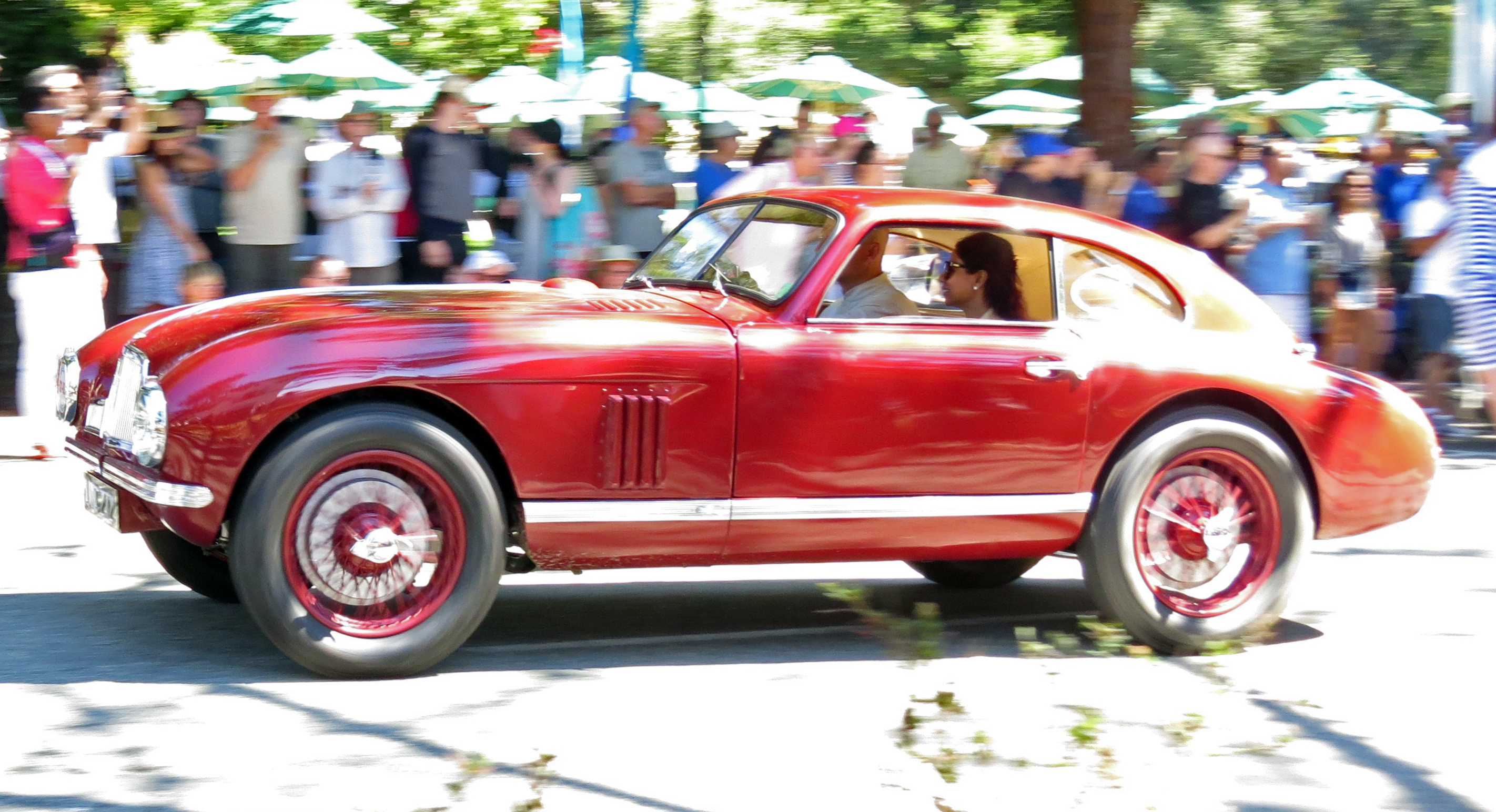
The fourth and last DB2 prototype, built in 1949 for David Brown's personal use

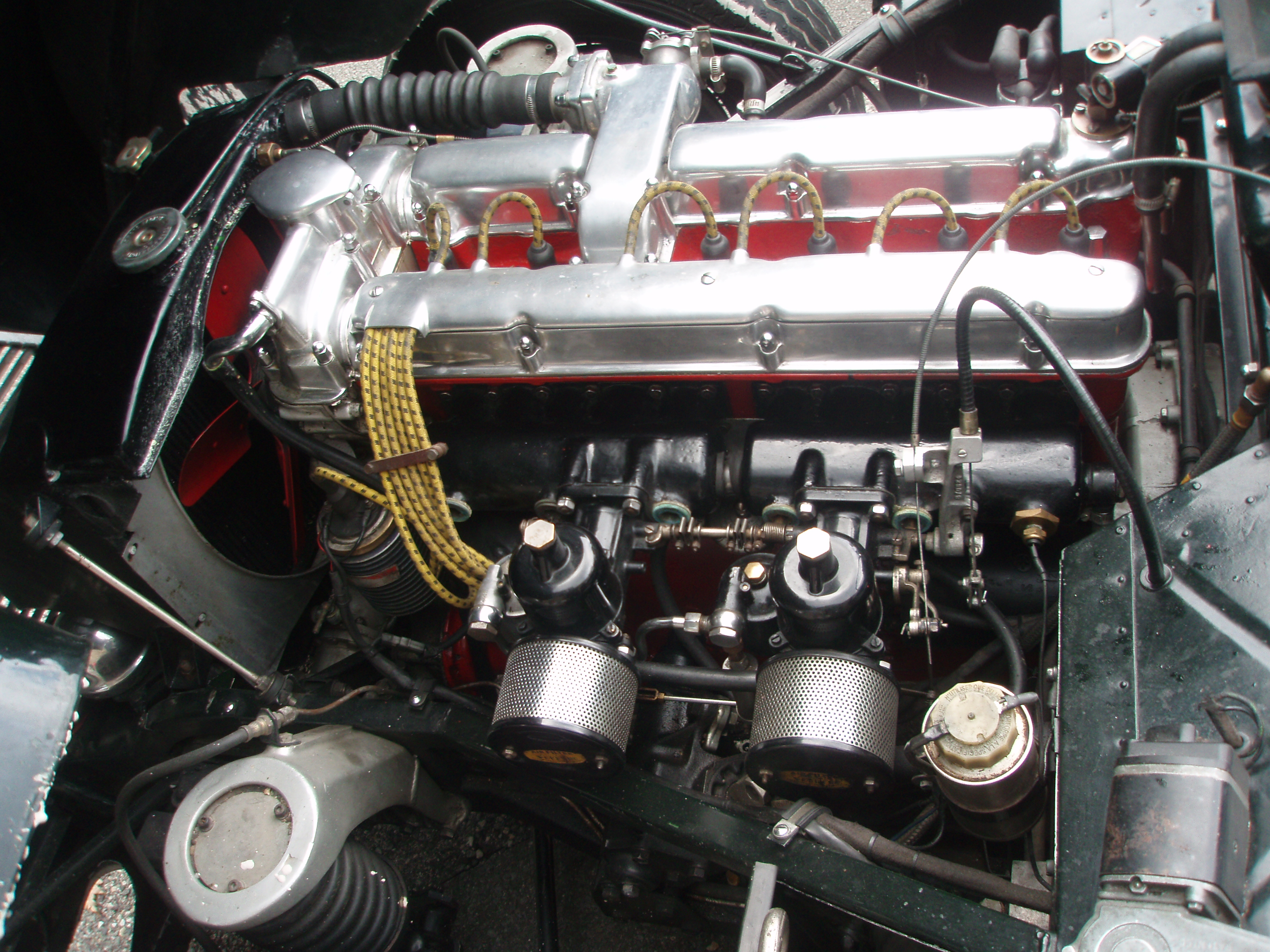
Aston Martin DB2 straight-6 engine

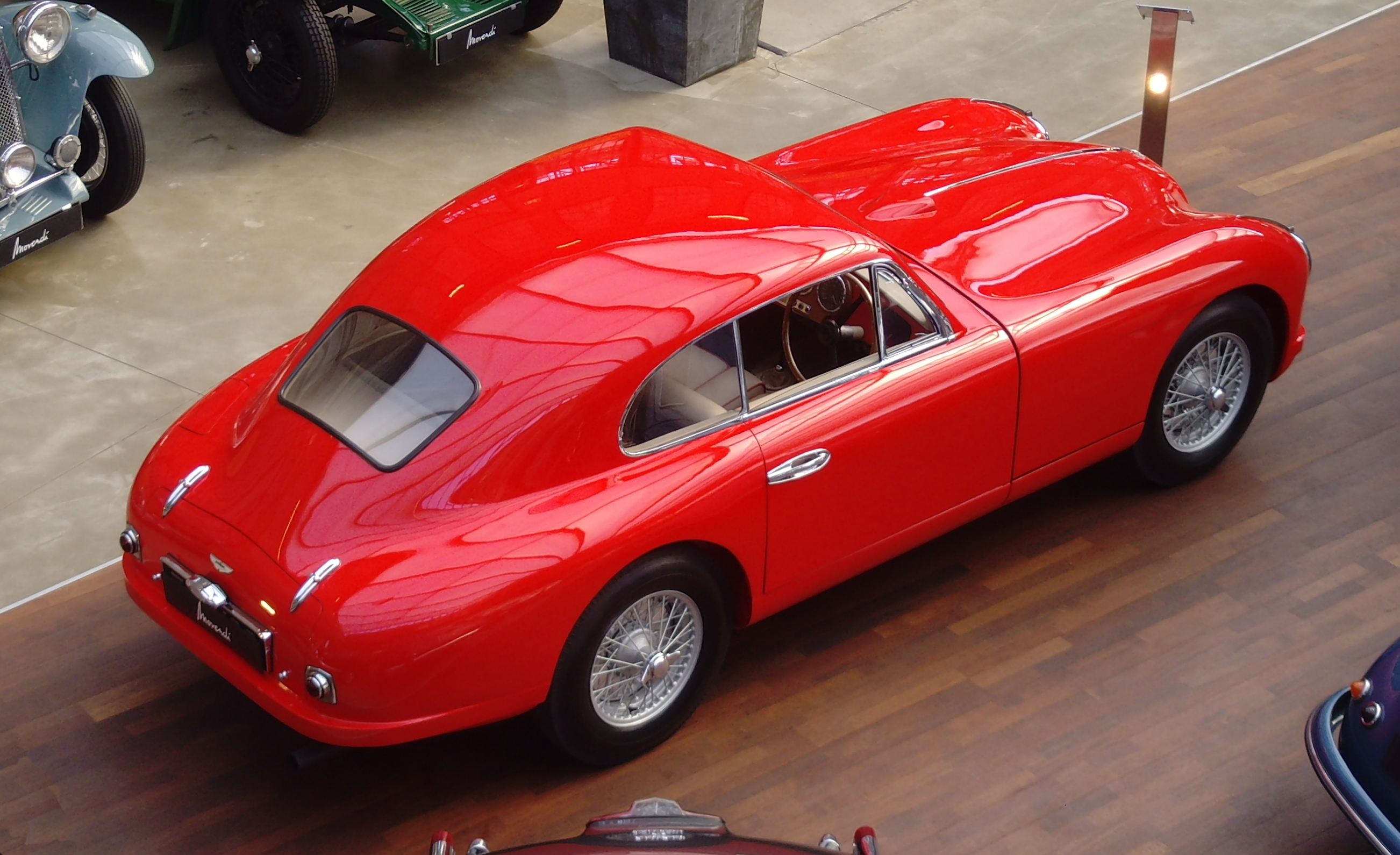
The Aston Martin DB2 closed coupé body was a fastback design by Frank Feeley

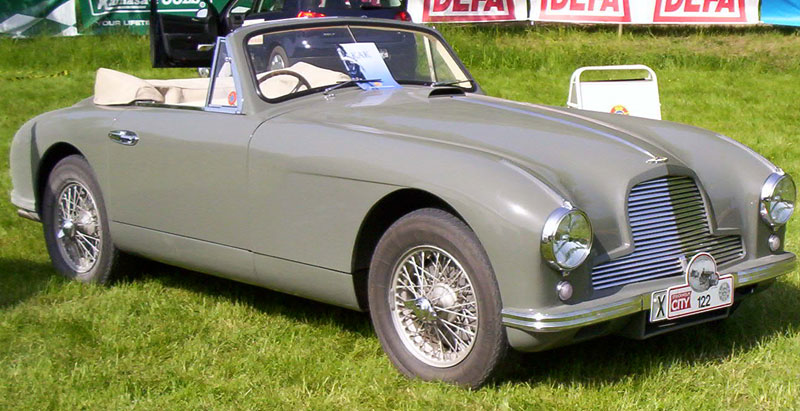
1951 Aston Martin DB2 Drophead Coupé

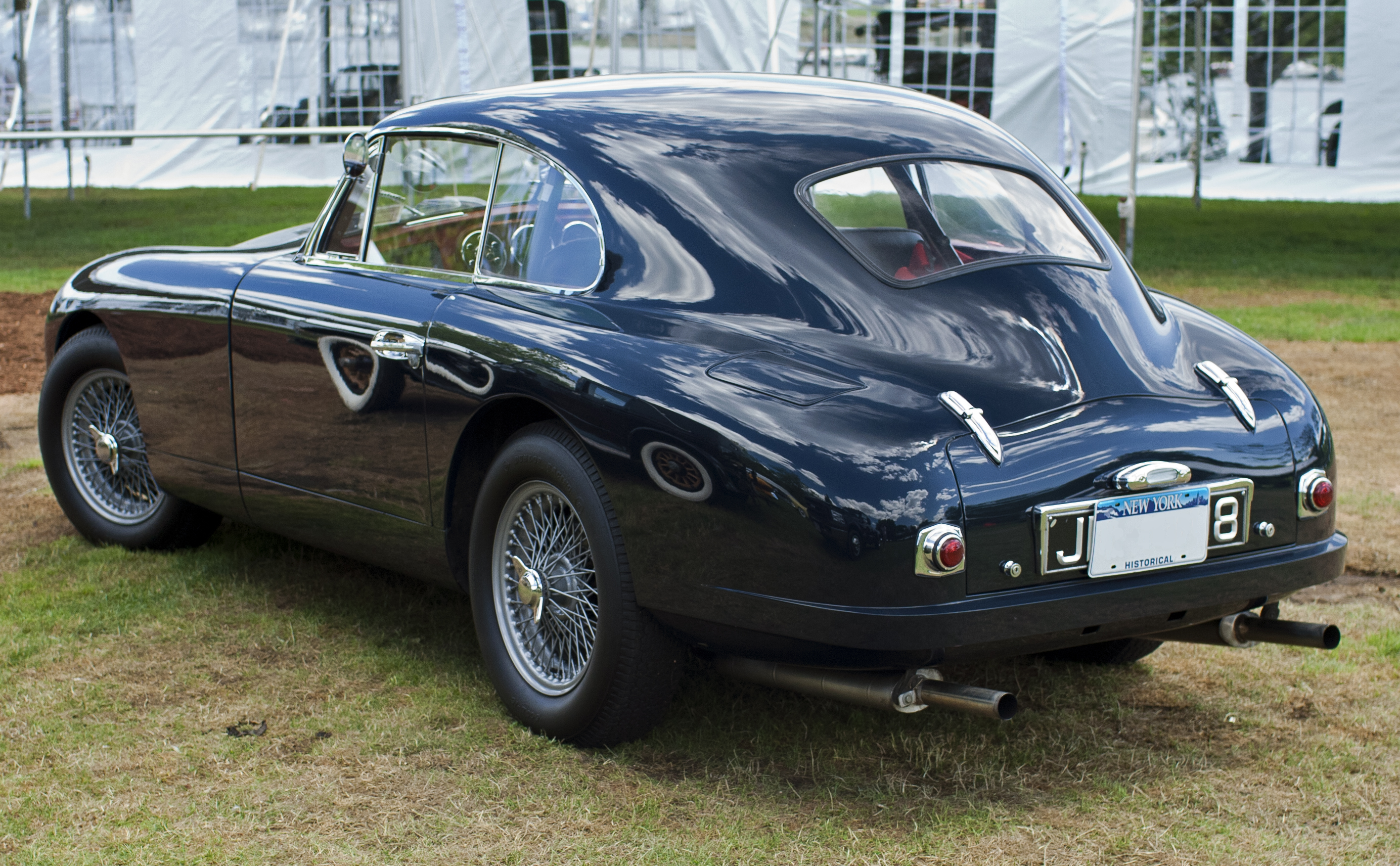
1953 Aston Martin DB
