= Aston Martin DB2/4 =

Aston Martin DB2/4 Mark I
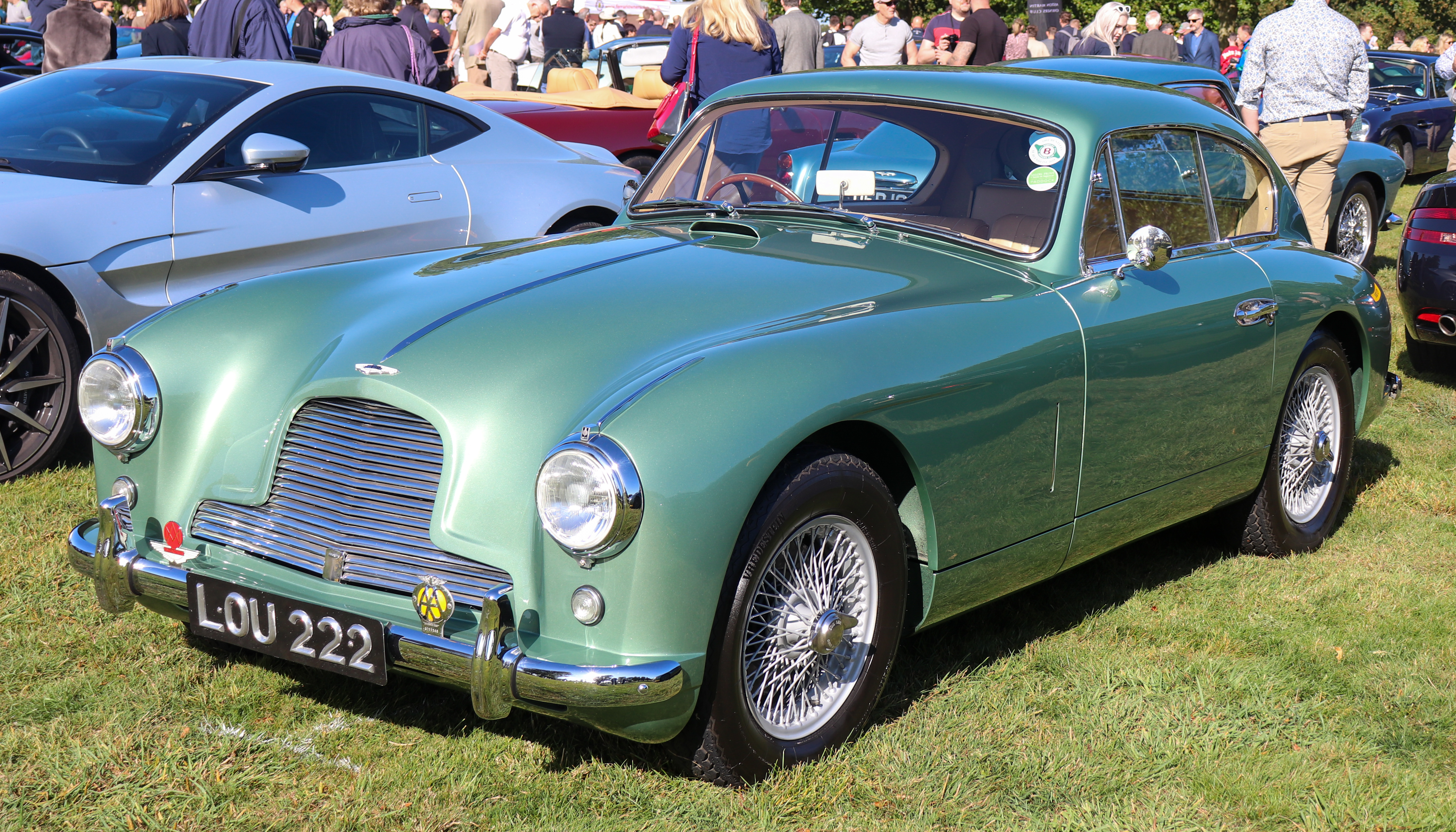
- Aston Martin DB2/4 Mark I

Overview
- Manufacturer: Aston Martin
- Production: 1953–1957; 764 produced
- Designer: Frank Feeley

Body and chassis
- Class: Grand tourer
- Body style: 2+2 hatchback; 2-seat drophead coupé; 2-seat fixed head
- Layout: FR layout

Powertrain
- Engine: 2.6 L Lagonda I6; 2.9 L Lagonda I6

Dimensions
- Wheelbase: 99 in (2,515 mm)
- Length: 169.5 in (4,305 mm)
- Width: 65 in (1,651 mm)
- Height: 53.5 in (1,359 mm)

Chronology
- Predecessor: Aston Martin DB2
- Successor: Aston Martin DB Mark III

The Aston Martin DB2/4 is a grand tourer produced by Aston Martin from 1953 until 1957. It was available as a 2+2 hatchback saloon, drophead coupé (DHC) and 2-seat fixed-head coupé. A small number of Bertone bodied spiders and a coupé were commissioned by American businessman Stanley H. Arnolt II.

== Overview ==
The DB2/4 was based on the DB2, which it replaced. The key change was the addition of two small rear seats and an opening rear tailgate giving access to the luggage space. Other changes included a single-piece windscreen, larger bumpers, and repositioned headlights.

The Lagonda straight-6 engine, designated the VB6E, was initially the same dual overhead cam straight-6 designed by W. O. Bentley and used in the Vantage version of the DB2. Displacement was 2.6 L (2,580 cc/157 in^{3}), giving 125 hp (93 kW). In September 1953 the Saloon received a 140 hp (104 kW) 2.9 L (2,922 cc/178 in^{3}) VB6J variant, followed by the Drophead in April 1954. Maximum speed was raised to 120 mph (193 km/h).

Of the 565 Mark I models produced, 102 were Drophead Coupés.

A 2.9 litre DB2/4 tested by British magazine The Motor in 1954 had a top speed of 118.5 mph (190.7 km/h) and accelerated from 0-60 mph (97 km/h) in 10.5 seconds. A fuel consumption of 23.0 miles per imperial gallon (12.3 L/100 km; 19.2 mpg_{‑US}) was recorded. The test car cost £2621 including taxes.

Three works cars were prepared for the 1955 Monte Carlo Rally and two for the Mille Miglia. Aston Martin pursued its competitive ambitions more intently with the DB3, which was designed specifically for sports-car racing.

A DB2/4 Mk I Drophead Coupé appeared in the 1963 Alfred Hitchcock film The Birds

== Mark II ==
The DB2/4 Mk II model, introduced in 1955, offered an optional large-valve, high compression (8.6:1) 165 hp (123 kW) engine. Other changes included small tailfins, bubble-type tail lights as on the Morris Minor, and added chrome. The bonnet horizontal split line was also changed from door sill height to a line carried backwards from the top of the front wheel arch.

A 2-seat Fixed Head Coupé (FHC) was new, in addition to the continued Drophead. 34 of the 199 Mark II models used this new coupé body, a style favored by David Brown for his own car. Three Mark II chassis were sent to Carrozzeria Touring in Italy to be bodied as Spider models. Touring would later help Aston with the Superleggera design of the DB4.

One significant behind-the-scenes change for the Mark II was the relocation of coachbuilding responsibilities from Mulliner's of Feltham to Tickford's works in Newport Pagnell. Brown had purchased Tickford in 1954 and would move all of Aston Martin's operations there with the start of DB4 production.

== Production ==
  - Mark I: 565
    - Drophead Coupé: 102
    - Bertone Spider: 6, plus 1 Coupé
  - Mark II: 199
    - Fixed Head Coupé: 34
    - Drophead Coupé: 16
    - Touring Spider: 3
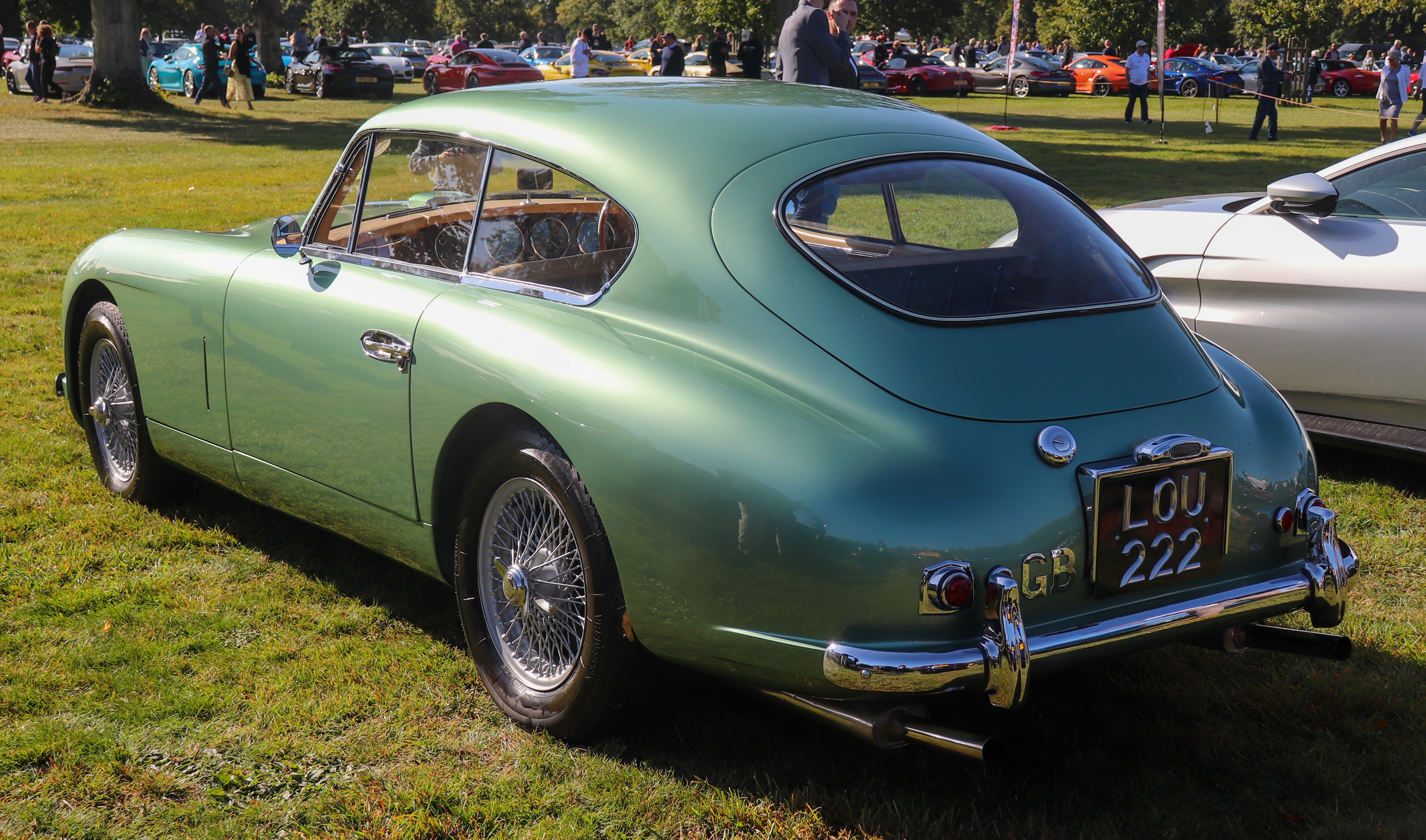
Aston Martin DB2/4 "Mark I" Saloon

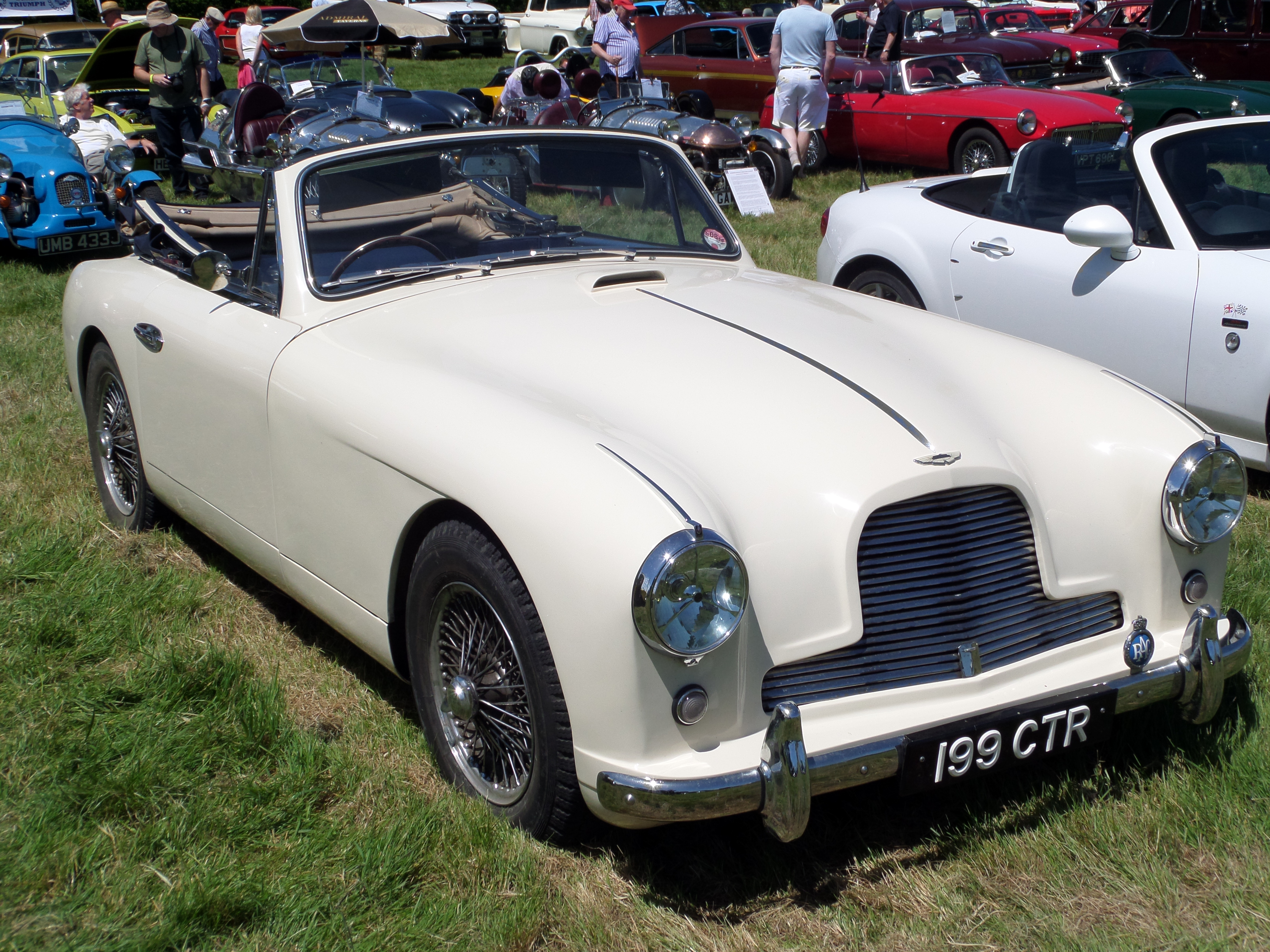
1954 Aston Martin DB2/4 "Mark I" Drophead Coupé

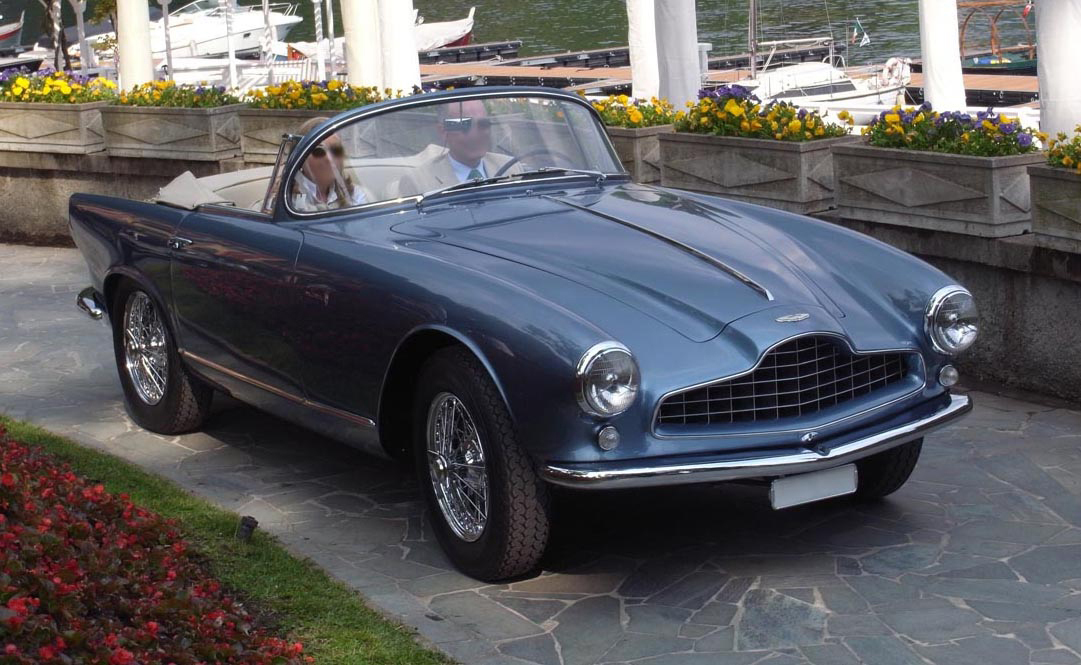
1954 Aston Martin DB2/4 Bertone Spider

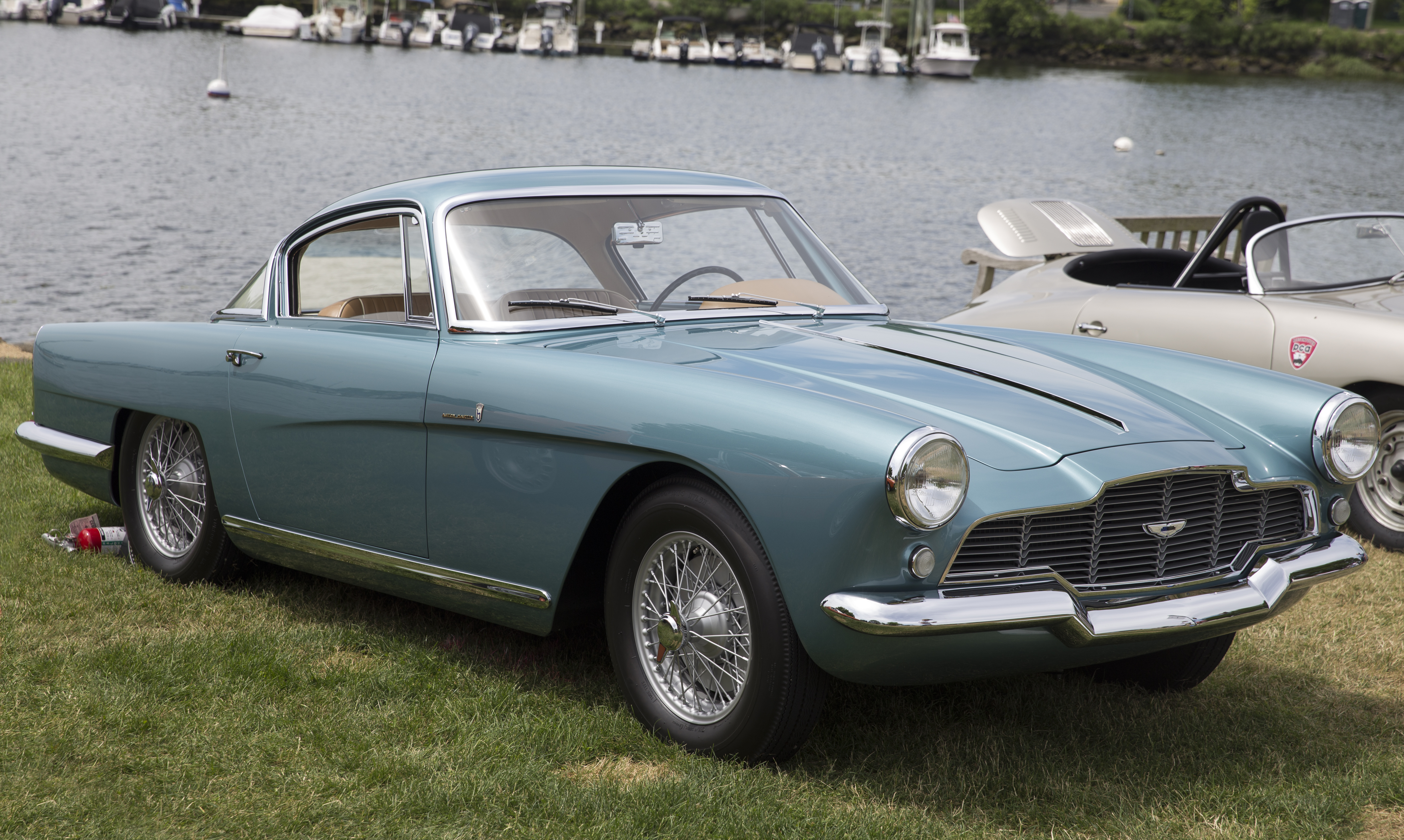
The sole Aston Martin DB2/4 Bertone Coupé (1954)

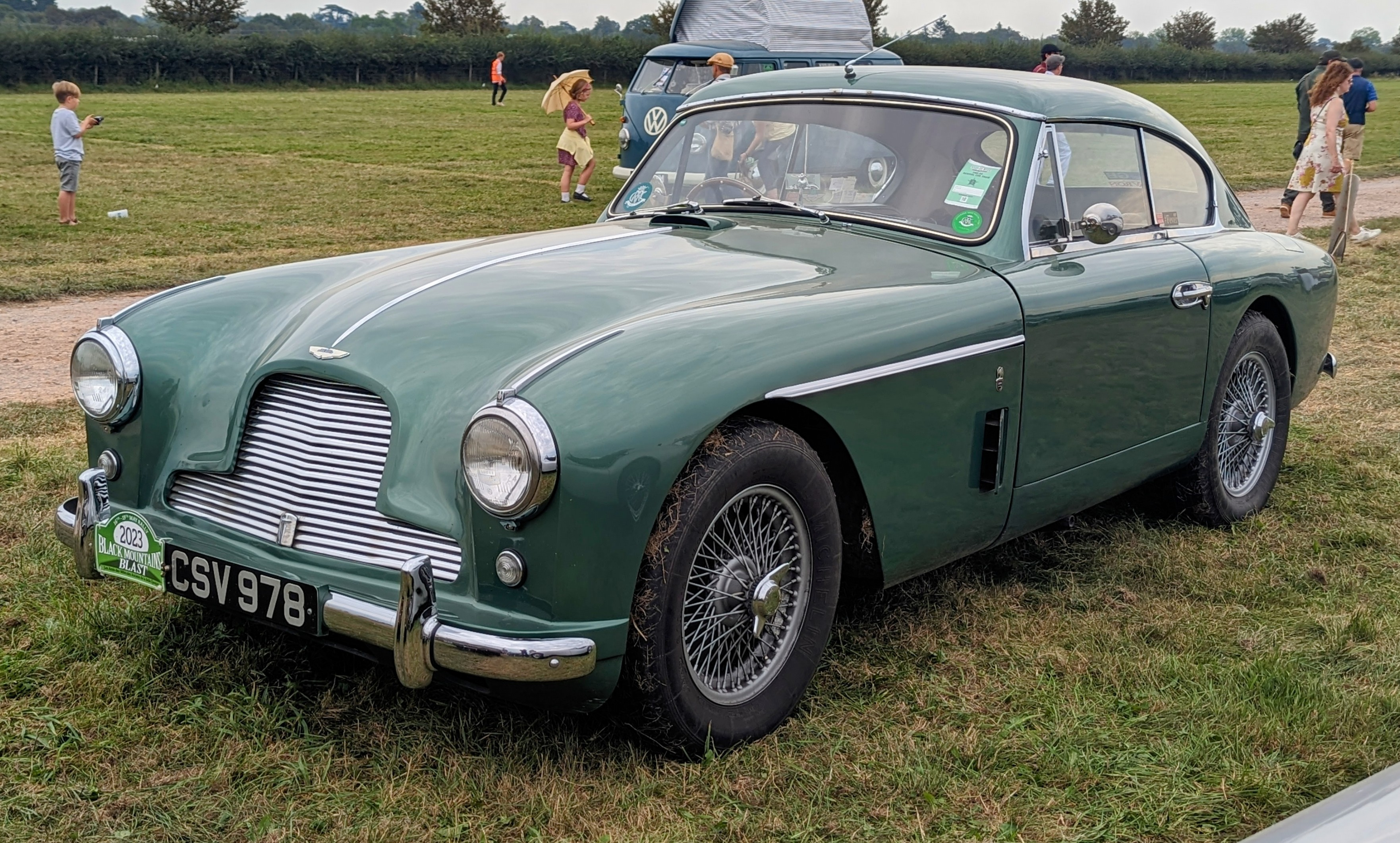
Aston Martin DB2/4 Mark II Saloon

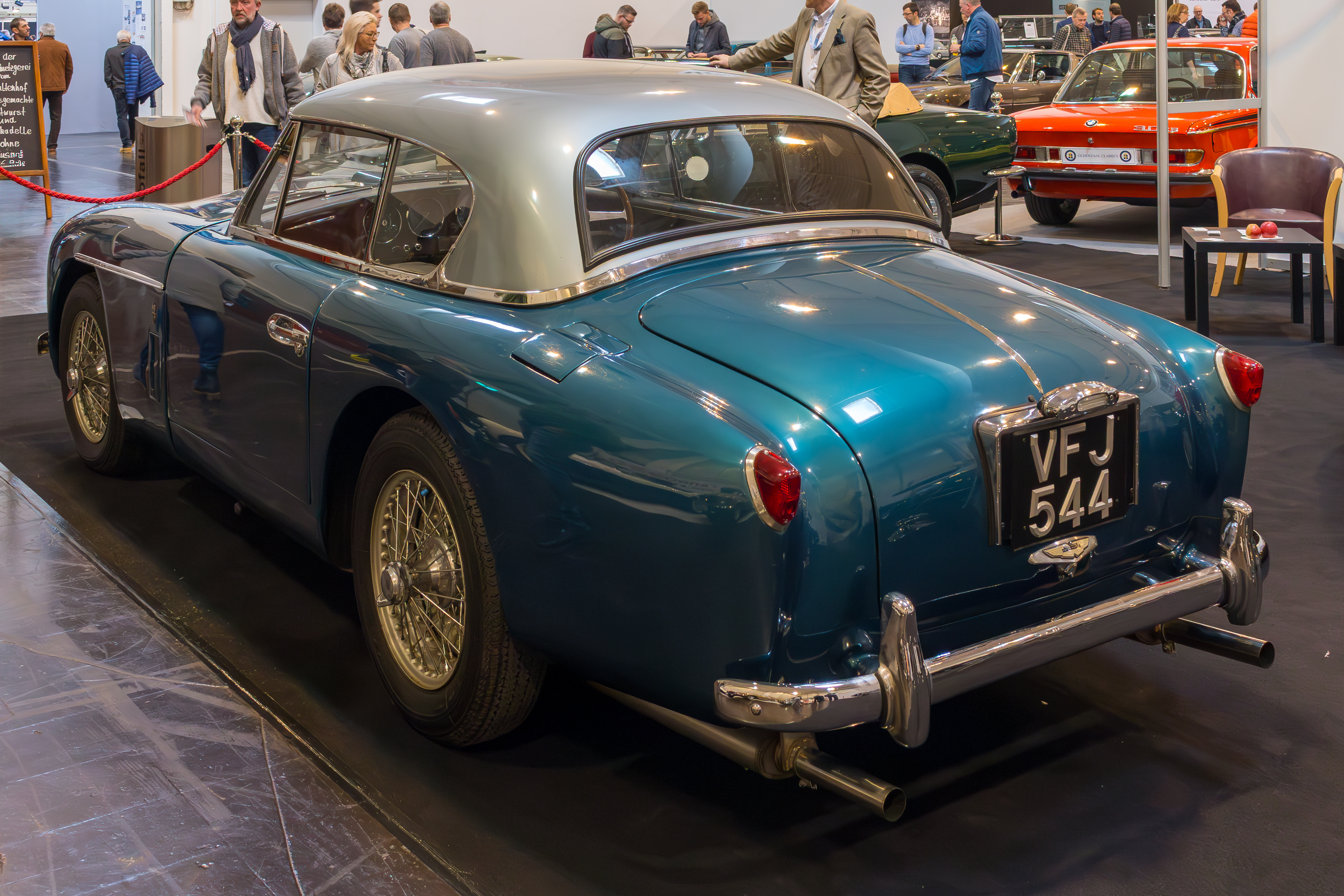
Aston Martin DB2/4 Mark II Fixed Head Coupé by Tickford, one of 34 produced

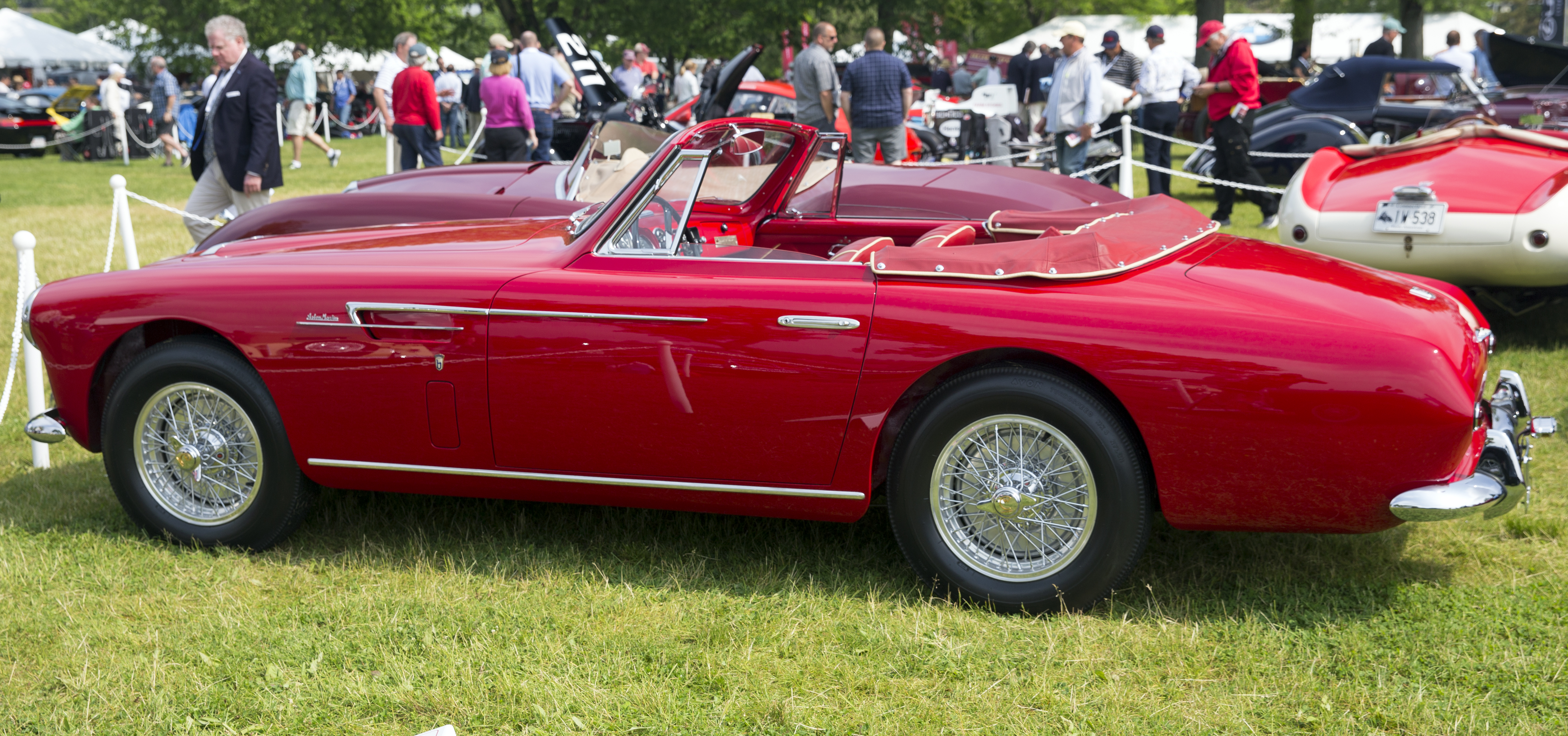
Drophead Coupé designed by Giovanni Michelotti for Bertone

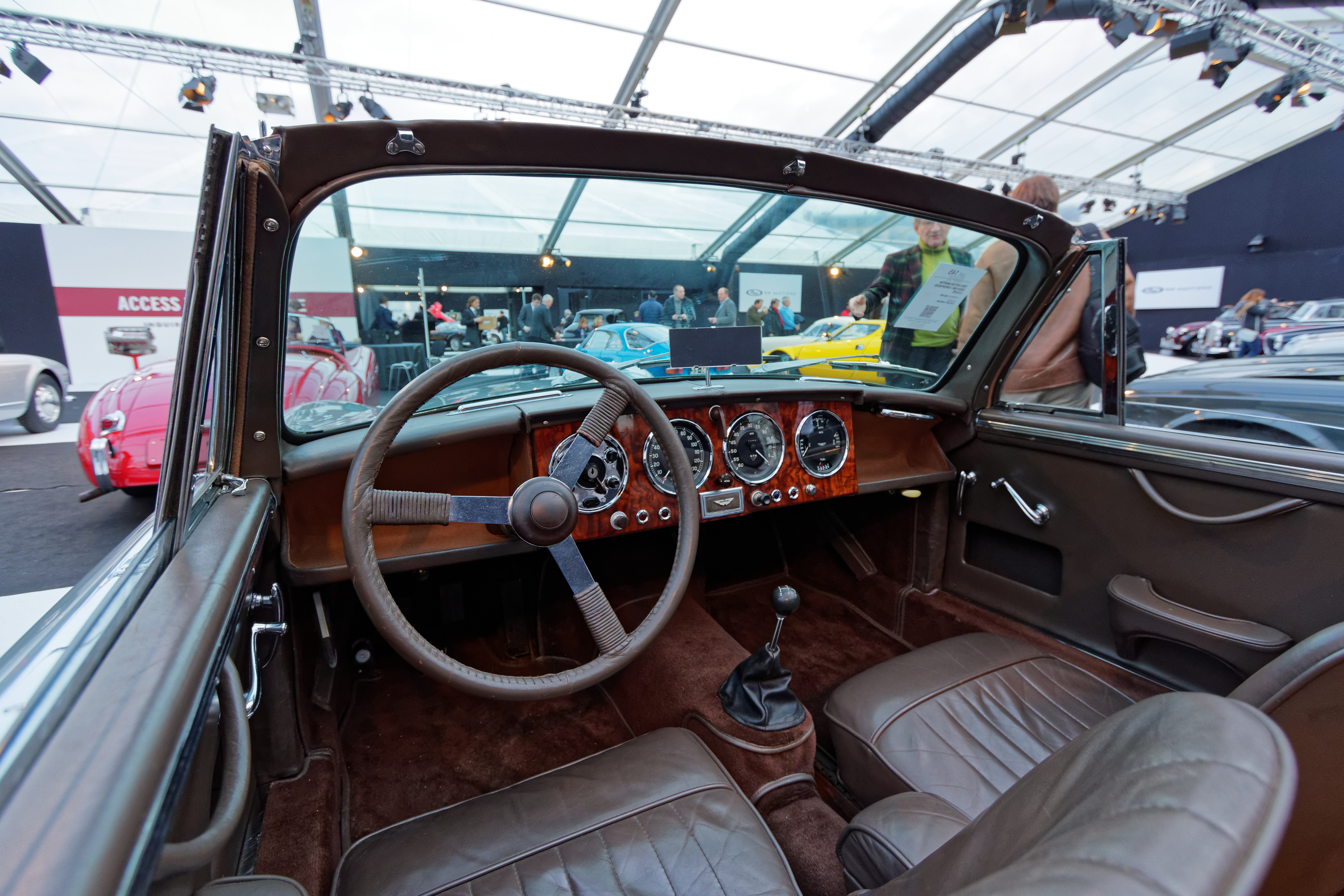
1955 Aston Martin DB2/4 Drophead Coupé interior
