= Aston Martin DB3 =

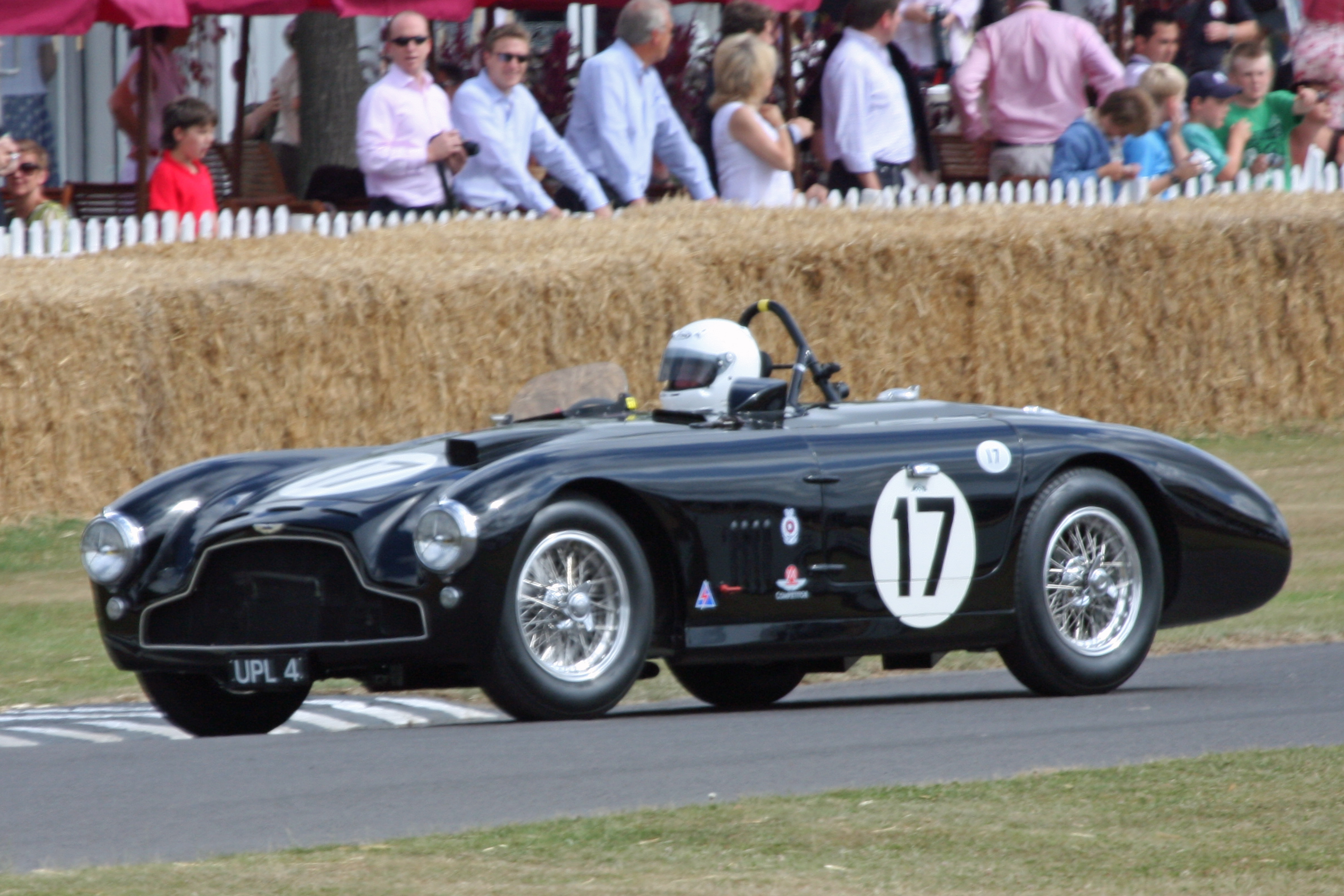
- Aston Martin DB3/5, at Goodwood Festival of Speed 2009
- Category: Le Mans Racer Sports car racing
- Constructor: Aston Martin Lagonda LTD
- Designer: Robert Eberan von Eberhorst

Technical specifications
- Chassis: Twin-tubular, aluminium body, open two seater
- Suspension (front): Torsion bar and trailing arms
- Suspension (rear): Torsion bars, parallel links, panhard rod, De Dion axle
- Length: 13 ft 2½ in (4,026 mm)
- Width: 5 ft 1½ in (1,562 mm)
- Height: 3 ft 4 in (1,016 mm)
- Axle track: 4 ft 3 in (1,295 mm)
- Wheelbase: 7 ft 9 in (2,362 mm)
- Engine: Lagonda 2,580 cc/2.9L Straight 6, Twin OHC, FR Layout, 3 twin-choke Weber 36 DCF5 carburettors
- Transmission: David Brown S527, 5-speed Manual, later a David Brown S430/63R, 4-speed Manual, 9" single clutch
- Tyres: Dunlop 16 x 6

Competition history
- Notable entrants: (United Kingdom) David Brown
- Notable drivers: (United Kingdom) Reg Parnell

See Aston Martin DB Mark III for the road car often called "DB3"

The Aston Martin DB3 and later DB3S were sports racing cars built in the 1950s. Although they used some DB2 parts, they were quite different, being designed specially for racing. The original modifications were done by ex-Auto Union engineer, Eberan von Eberhorst, though others handled the later DB3S work.

== DB3 ==
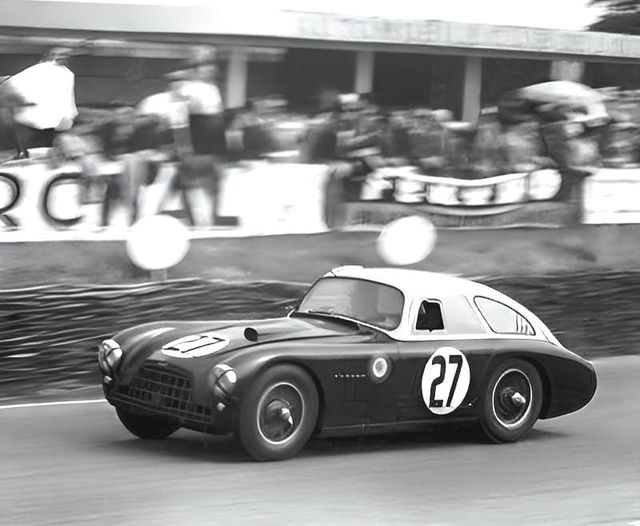
DB3/1 at Le Mans in 1952, driven by Reg Parnell and Eric Thompson.

The DB3 was originally going to be fitted with "a new V12 commissioned at around the same time", however "funds had to be spent on making the DB3 competitive". The DB3 was introduced in 1951 with a 133 hp (99 kW) 2.6 L Lagonda straight-6 engine from the DB2 Vantage. The car was unsuccessful, so a larger 2.9 L engine, producing 163 hp (122 kW), was introduced in June 1952. The car was placed 2nd, 3rd, and 4th at Silverstone May 1952 (in 2.6 L form) that year behind a Jaguar C-Type. The cars were forced out of Le Mans, but did claim the 9-hour race at Goodwood.

In 1953 a DB3 driven by Parnell/Abecassis placed 2nd at the Sebring 12 Hours, the opening race in the World Sports Car Championship, behind a Cunningham CR4 and then at the second round at the Mille Miglia, Reg Parnell drove a DB3 to 5th place, the highest position ever reached by a British sports car in the Italian classic. The car was then replaced as Astons front line car by the DB3S.

=== Chassis numbers ===
In total 10 DB3s were made between 1951 and 1953, with chassis numbers from DB3/1 to DB3/10. Cars 1 to 5 being used as works cars and cars 6 to 10 being sold as customer cars. Ended her sporting life, chassis number 1 was sold to Eric Forrest Greene in 1953; unfortunately he only used once, at the 1954 1000 km Buenos Aires. The car crashed and fired, causing the death of his pilot. After the accident, the chassis 1 was repaired and reformed, and used in competition by the son Jack.

=== Coupés ===
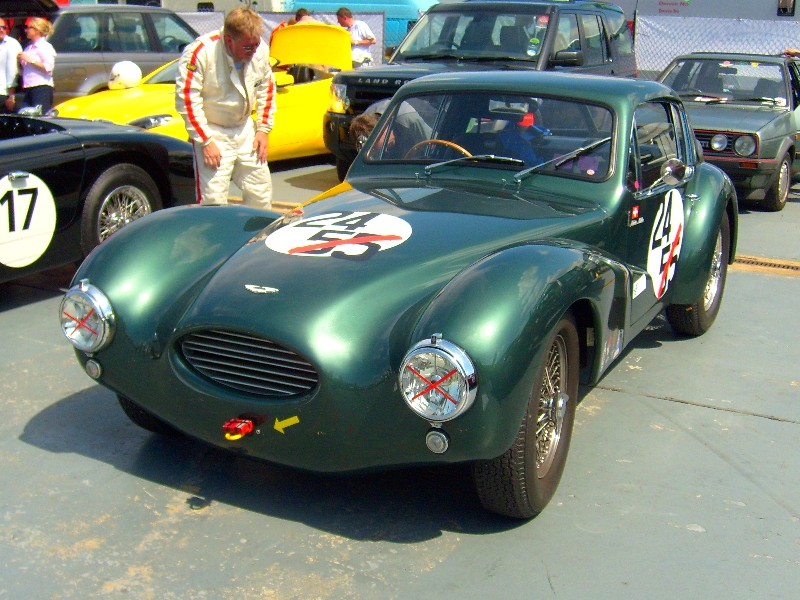
Aston Martin DB3 Coupe

Several Aston Martin DB3s have received coupé style bodies over the years. Pictured left is Aston Martin DB3/7 Coupé at Silverstone Classic 2008

== DB3S ==
The DB3S was a lighter version of the car, introduced in 1953. It was somewhat more successful, and was produced until 1956.

Originally two 'works' coupé versions were also built.

In 1956 the DB3S was replaced by the DBR1, which claimed victory in the 1959 24 Hours of Le Mans.

1952 Aston Martin DB3
Aston Martin DB3 at Goodwood Festival of Speed 2009
