= Lagonda straight-6 engine =

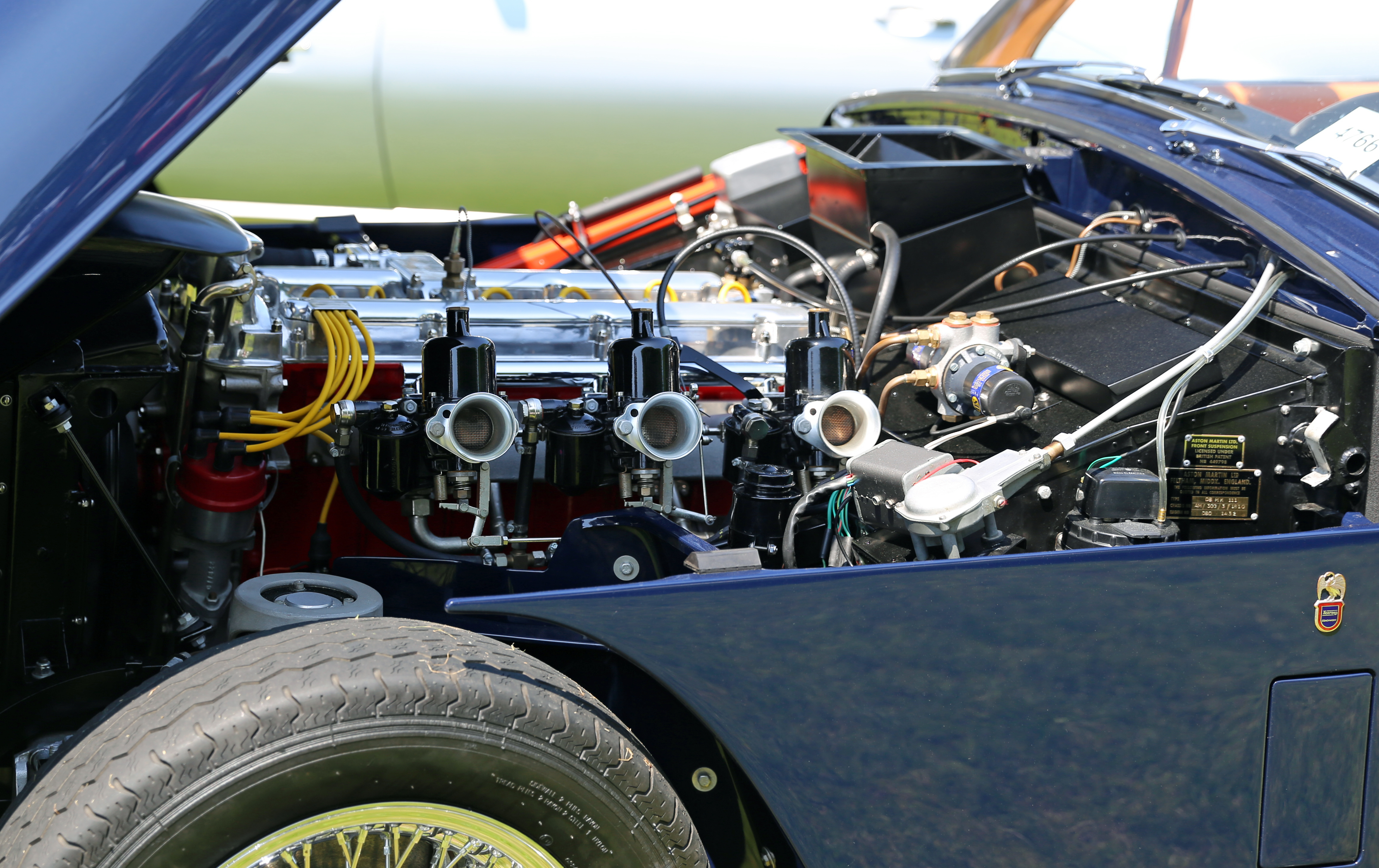
Aston Martin Lagonda DBD engine in a 1959 DB 2/4 Mark III

The Lagonda Straight-6 is a famous automobile engine used by Aston Martin and Lagonda marques in the 1950s. Designed by Willie Watson under the supervision of Walter Owen Bentley of Bentley Motors Limited, it vaulted Aston Martin to fame as a maker of desirable sports and racing cars.

== History ==
Towards the end of World War II, W. O. Bentley began working on a new straight-six engine for the Lagonda marque. Bentley had taken a seat on Lagonda's board of directors when Alan Good bought and re-organised Lagonda in June 1935. Bentley had completed his obligatory three years term with former rival Rolls-Royce following their 1931 acquisition of his former business. They had refused to return it to racing and had replaced many of his chassis and engine designs with their own. It was clear Lagonda's successful V12 would be seen as too extravagant for the postwar market.

Bentley and his team developed a modern dual overhead cam straight-six engine. It initially displaced 2.6 L (2580 cc/157 in^{3}) with a 78 mm (3.07 in) bore and 90 mm (3.543 in) stroke and produced roughly 105 hp (78 kW) with dual SU carburettors.

The Lagonda straight-6 caught the attention of David Brown, who had purchased Aston Martin in 1947. Aston's Claude Hill-designed four-cylinder was not powerful enough for Brown, who desired a powerful, and high-tech, powerplant for Aston Martin. So Brown purchased Lagonda as well, incorporating Aston Martin Lagonda Ltd. that same year.

The first production vehicle to use Bentley's new engine was the 1948 Lagonda 2.6-Litre. This was a large car for the place and time, available as either a 4-door saloon or 2-door convertible, and it could only reach 84 mph (135 km/h).

Sales were slow, but Aston's 4-cylinder 2-Litre Sports model was barely selling at all. Brown decided to share the straight-6 with Aston, creating the wildly successful DB2 model. This car placed first and second in class at the 24 Hours of Le Mans on its introduction in 1950, propelling Aston Martin into the top tier of post-war sports car companies.

The 2.6 L straight-6 went on to power the DB3 racing car and DB2/4 road car, before being enlarged to 2.9 L (2922 cc/178 in^{3} 83 mm x 90 mm) in 1952 for the DB3, in 1953 for the DB2/4 Mk1 Saloon in September 1953 & April 1954 for the DB2/4 Mk1 DHC. Power eventually reached 195 hp the (145 kW) with triple twin-choke Weber carburettors in the "DBB"-spec DB Mark III after a Tadek Marek substantial redesign, but the engine by then was showing its age. It was replaced for the DB4 and later cars by a 3.7 L straight-6 designed by Tadek Marek.

== Applications ==
- 2.6 L (2580 cc/157 in^{3})
  - 1948–1953 Lagonda 2.6-Litre
  - 1950–1953 Aston Martin DB2
  - 1950–1952 Aston Martin DB3 in 1952 – Mille Miglia, Silverstone, Prix de Bern, Empire Trophy (Isle of Man), Le Mans 14/15.6.52, Jersey 10.07.52, Boreham 02.08.52, Goodwood 9 hrs (2 cars)
  - 1953–1954 Aston Martin DB2/4
- 2.9 L (2922 cc/178 in^{3})
  - 1952–1953 Aston Martin DB3 used 1st time Monaco 02.06.52 (3 cars) & then Goodwood 9 hrs 16.08.52 (1 car)
  - 1953–1956 Aston Martin DB3S
  - 1953–1958 Lagonda 3-Litre
  - 1954–1955 Aston Martin DB2/4
  - 1955–1957 Aston Martin DB2/4 Mark II
  - 1957–1959 Aston Martin DB Mark III after Marek redesign

== Performance ==
Application	Version	Displacement	Carburettor	Power output	Torque	Year
Lagonda 2.6-Litre	Mark I	2,580 cc (157 cu in) (78 mm × 90 mm (3.1 in × 3.5 in))	2 x SU H4	105 bhp (78 kW)	180 N⋅m (133 lb⋅ft)	1948-1952
Lagonda 2.6-Litre	Mark II	2,580 cc (157 cu in) (78 mm × 90 mm (3.1 in × 3.5 in))	2 x SU H6	125 bhp (93 kW)	195 N⋅m (144 lb⋅ft)	1952-1953
Aston Martin DB2	Series I	2,580 cc (157 cu in) (78 mm × 90 mm (3.1 in × 3.5 in))	2 x SU H4	105 bhp (78 kW)	180 N⋅m (133 lb⋅ft)	1950-1951
Aston Martin DB2	Series II	2,580 cc (157 cu in) (78 mm × 90 mm (3.1 in × 3.5 in))	2 x SU H4	107 bhp (80 kW)	180 N⋅m (133 lb⋅ft)	1951-1953
Aston Martin DB2	Series II Vantage	2,580 cc (157 cu in) (78 mm × 90 mm (3.1 in × 3.5 in))	2 x SU H6	125 bhp (93 kW)	195 N⋅m (144 lb⋅ft)	1951-1953
Aston Martin DB2/4	Mark I	2,580 cc (157 cu in) (78 mm × 90 mm (3.1 in × 3.5 in))	2 x SU H6	125 bhp (93 kW)	195 N⋅m (144 lb⋅ft)	1953-1954
Aston Martin DB3		2,580 cc (157 cu in) (78 mm × 90 mm (3.1 in × 3.5 in))	3 x Weber 35 DCO	140 bhp (104 kW)	195 N⋅m (144 lb⋅ft)	1951-1954
Lagonda 3-Litre	Mark I	2,922 cc (178.3 cu in) (83 mm × 90 mm (3.3 in × 3.5 in))	2 x SU H6	140 bhp (104 kW)	241 N⋅m (178 lb⋅ft)	1953-1955
Lagonda 3-Litre	Mark II	2,922 cc (178.3 cu in) (83 mm × 90 mm (3.3 in × 3.5 in))	2 x SU H6	165 bhp (123 kW)	250 N⋅m (184 lb⋅ft)	1955-1958
Aston Martin DB2/4	Mark I 3-Litre	2,922 cc (178.3 cu in) (83 mm × 90 mm (3.3 in × 3.5 in))	2 x SU H6	140 bhp (104 kW)	241 N⋅m (178 lb⋅ft)	1954-1955
Aston Martin DB2/4	Mark II	2,922 cc (178.3 cu in) (83 mm × 90 mm (3.3 in × 3.5 in))	2 x SU H6	140 bhp (104 kW)	241 N⋅m (178 lb⋅ft)	1955-1957
Aston Martin DB2/4	Mark II Special Series	2,922 cc (178.3 cu in) (83 mm × 90 mm (3.3 in × 3.5 in))	2 x SU H6	165 bhp (123 kW)	250 N⋅m (184 lb⋅ft)	1955-1957
Aston Martin DB2/4	Mark III DBA	2,922 cc (178.3 cu in) (83 mm × 90 mm (3.3 in × 3.5 in))	2 x SU H6	162 bhp (121 kW)	238 N⋅m (176 lb⋅ft)	1957-1959
Aston Martin DB2/4	Mark III DBA Dual Exhaust	2,922 cc (178.3 cu in) (83 mm × 90 mm (3.3 in × 3.5 in))	2 x SU H6	178 bhp (133 kW)	238 N⋅m (176 lb⋅ft)	1957-1959
Aston Martin DB2/4	Mark III DBB	2,922 cc (178.3 cu in) (83 mm × 90 mm (3.3 in × 3.5 in))	3 x Weber 35 DCO	195 bhp (145 kW)	264 N⋅m (195 lb⋅ft)	1958-1959
Aston Martin DB2/4	Mark III DBC	2,922 cc (178.3 cu in) (83 mm × 90 mm (3.3 in × 3.5 in))	3 x Weber 45 DCO	214 bhp (160 kW)		1958
Aston Martin DB2/4	Mark III DBD	2,922 cc (178.3 cu in) (83 mm × 90 mm (3.3 in × 3.5 in))	3 x SU H6	180 bhp (134 kW)	244 N⋅m (180 lb⋅ft)	1958-1959
Aston Martin DB3S		2,922 cc (178.3 cu in) (83 mm × 90 mm (3.3 in × 3.5 in))	3 x Weber 40 DCO	180 bhp (134 kW)		1954-1956
