= Lagonda 2.6-Litre =

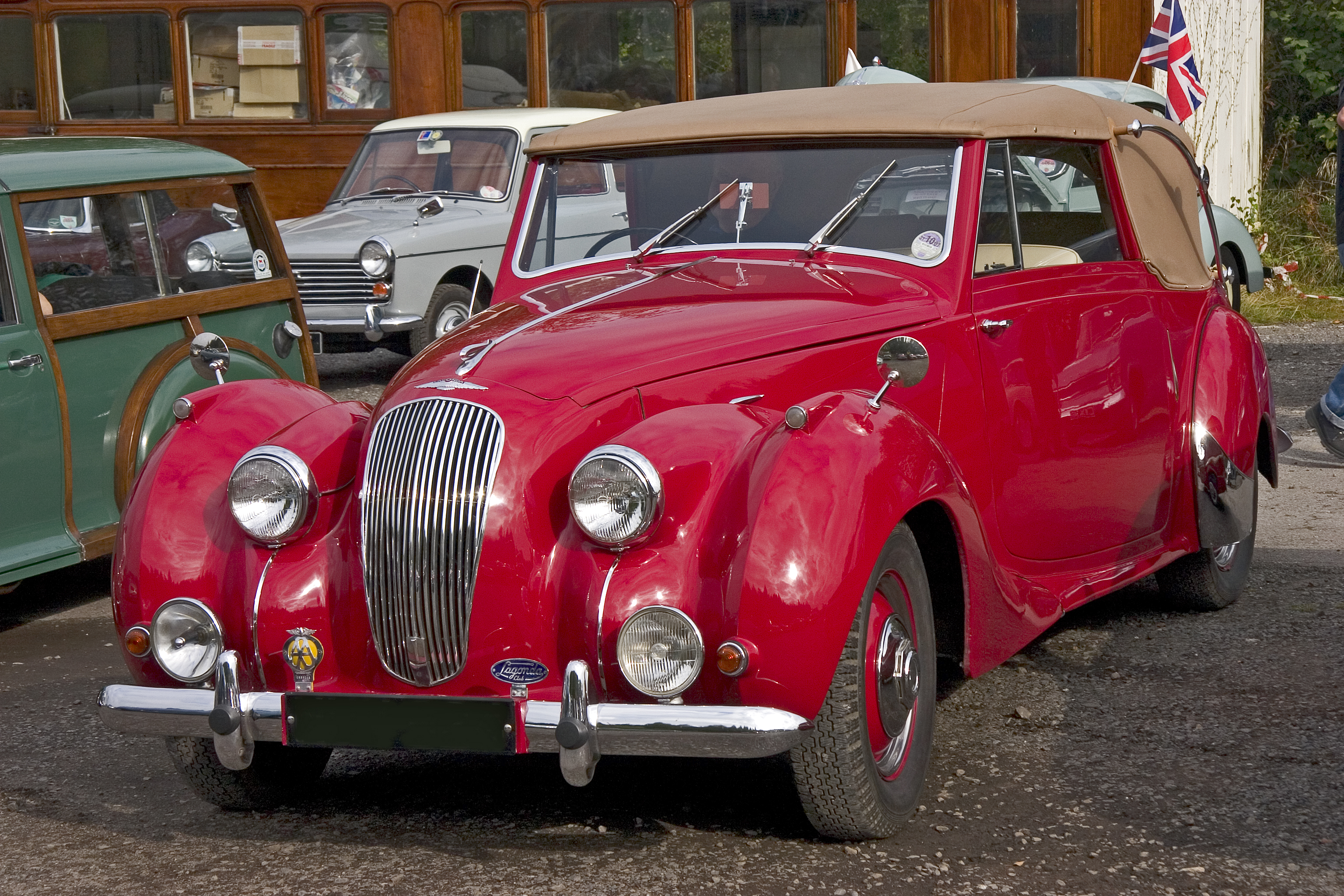
- Lagonda 2.6-Litre Drophead Coupé

Overview
- Manufacturer: Aston Martin Lagonda
- Production: 1948–1953; 510 produced
- Assembly: United Kingdom: Feltham, Middlesex

Body and chassis
- Class: Luxury car
- Body style: 4-door saloon; 2-door 4-seat drophead coupé

Powertrain
- Engine: 2.6 L Lagonda I6

Dimensions
- Wheelbase: 113.5 in (2,883 mm)
- Length: 188 in (4,775 mm)
- Width: 68 in (1,727 mm)
- Height: 61 in (1,549 mm)

Chronology
- Successor: Lagonda 3-Litre

The Lagonda 2.6-Litre was a luxury automobile produced in England by Lagonda from 1948 to 1953. It was the first model from that company following its purchase by David Brown in 1947, and was named for the new Lagonda straight-6 engine engine which debuted with the car. Designed by W. O. Bentley, it would propel Lagonda's new parent company, Aston Martin, to fame.

The 2.6-Litre (105 bhp) was a larger car than the Aston Martin models which were being produced under David Brown's ownership and was available as a 4-door saloon and, from 1949, as 2-door drophead coupé, both with 4 seats. The drophead was bodied by Tickford, at the time not part of Aston Martin. A Mark II version appeared in 1952, in saloon form only, with engine power increased to 125 bhp.

The car sold reasonably well, in spite of being both expensive and launched so soon after the war, with 510 examples made when production ended in 1953.

The 2.6-Litre was body-on-frame, and had fully independent suspension using coil springs at the front and torsion bars at the rear. At introduction, it was believed to be the only all-independently sprung British car. The Lockheed brakes had 12 in (305 mm) drums at the front and 11 in (279 mm) at the rear with the latter being mounted inboard. Rack and pinion steering was used.

A drophead version tested by The Motor magazine in 1949 had a top speed of 90.2 mph (145.2 km/h) and could accelerate from 0-60 mph (97 km/h) in 17.6 seconds. A fuel consumption of 17 miles per imperial gallon (17 L/100 km; 14 mpg_{‑US}) was recorded. The test car cost £3,420 including taxes.

== Gallery ==
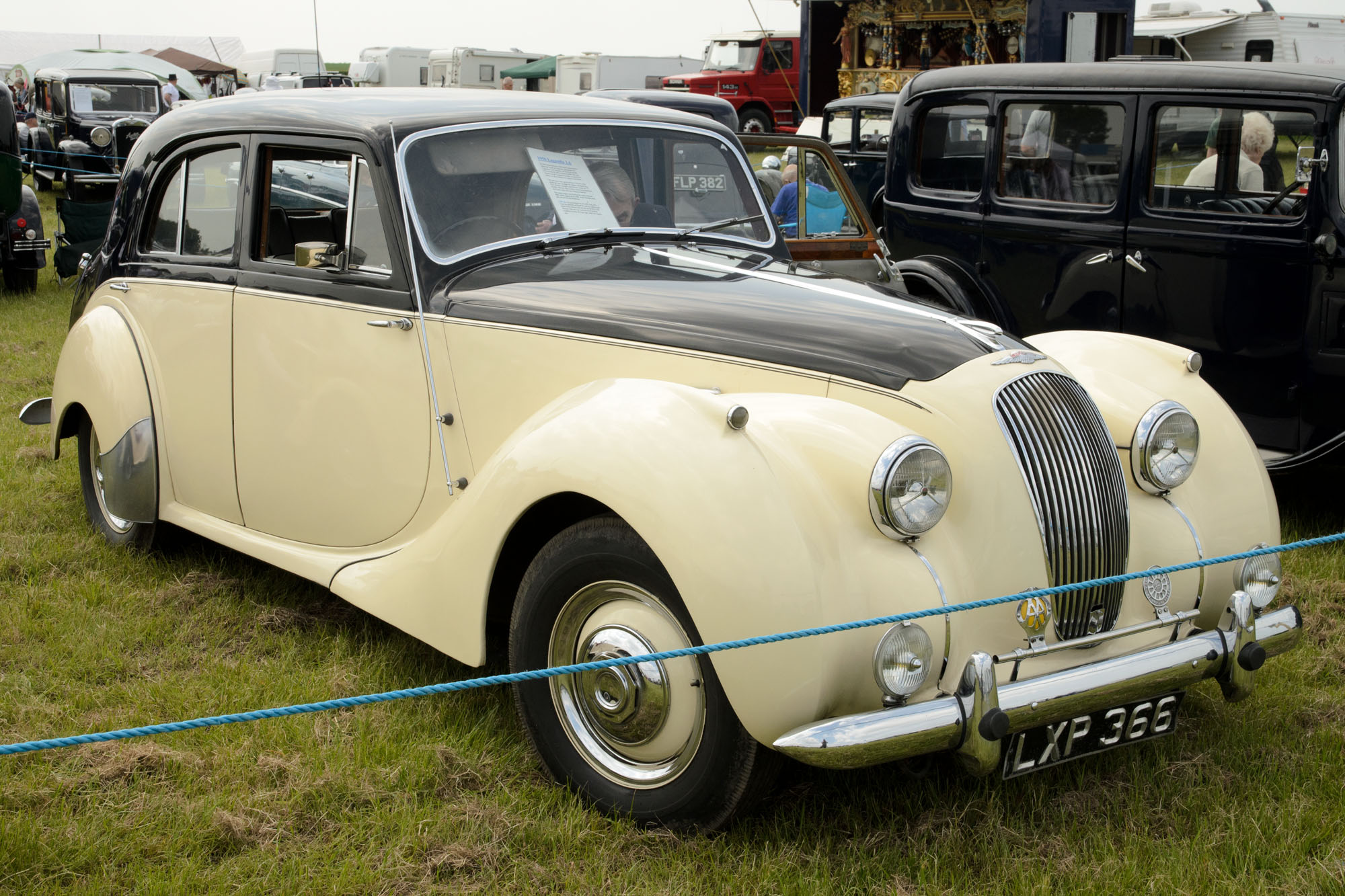
2.6-litre saloon by Frank Feeley

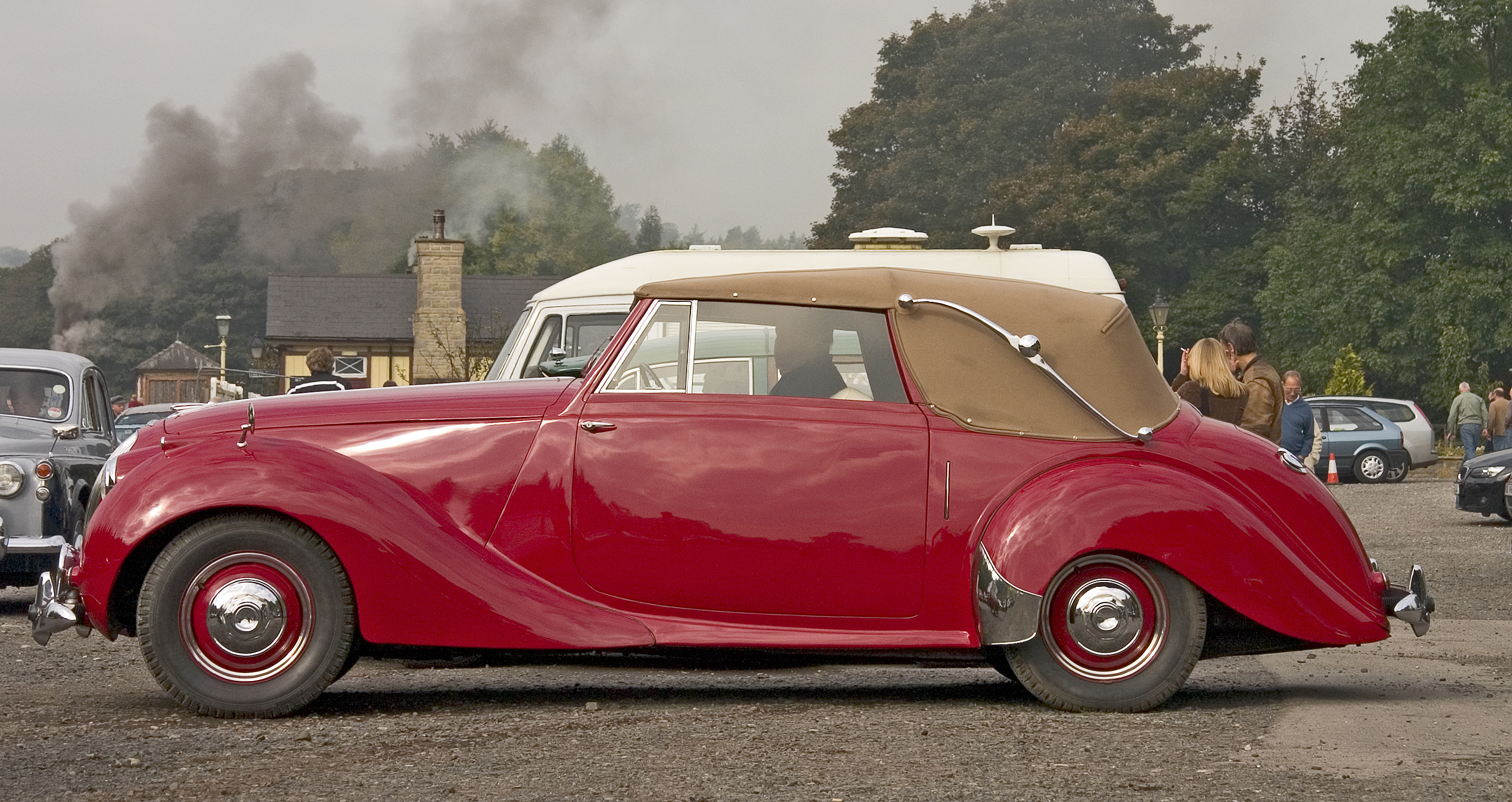
Drophead coupé by Tickford

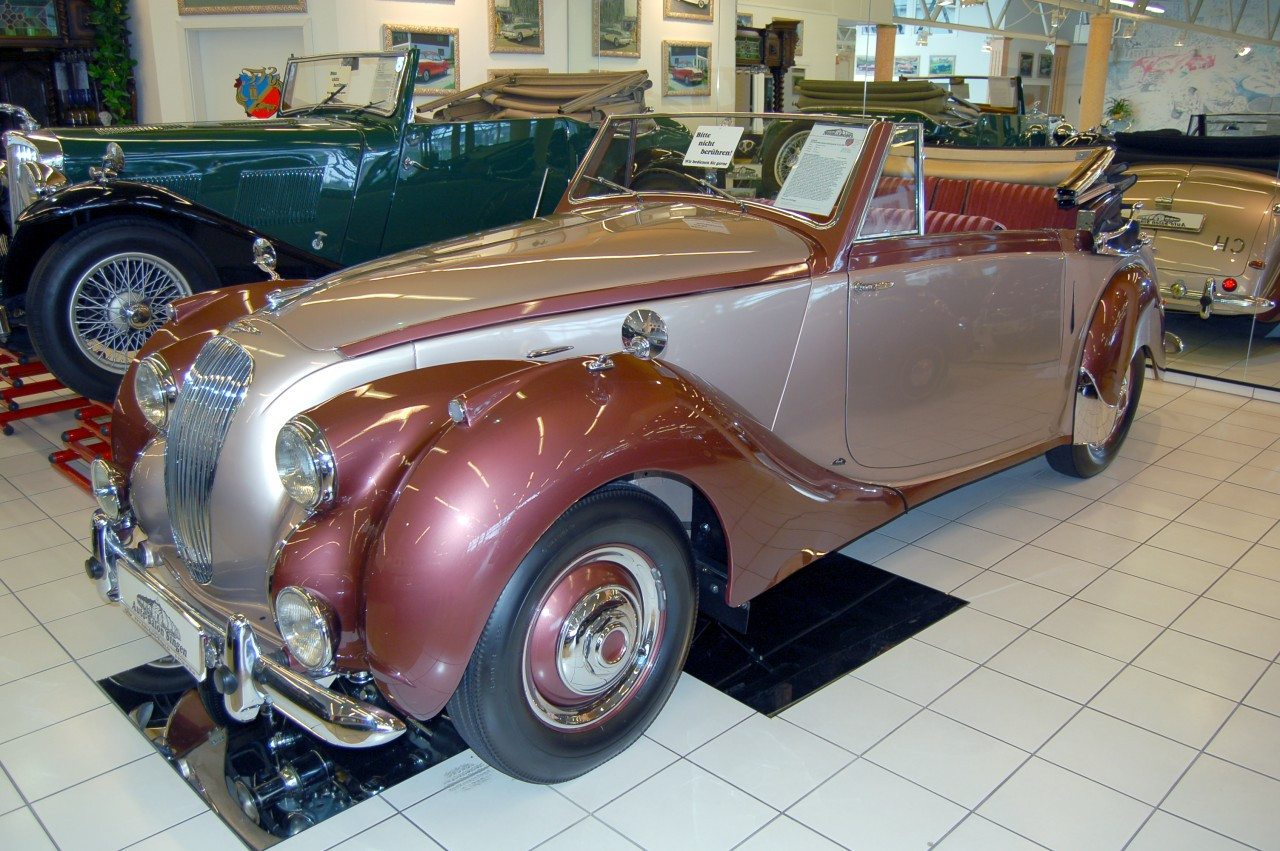
Body design by Frank Feeley

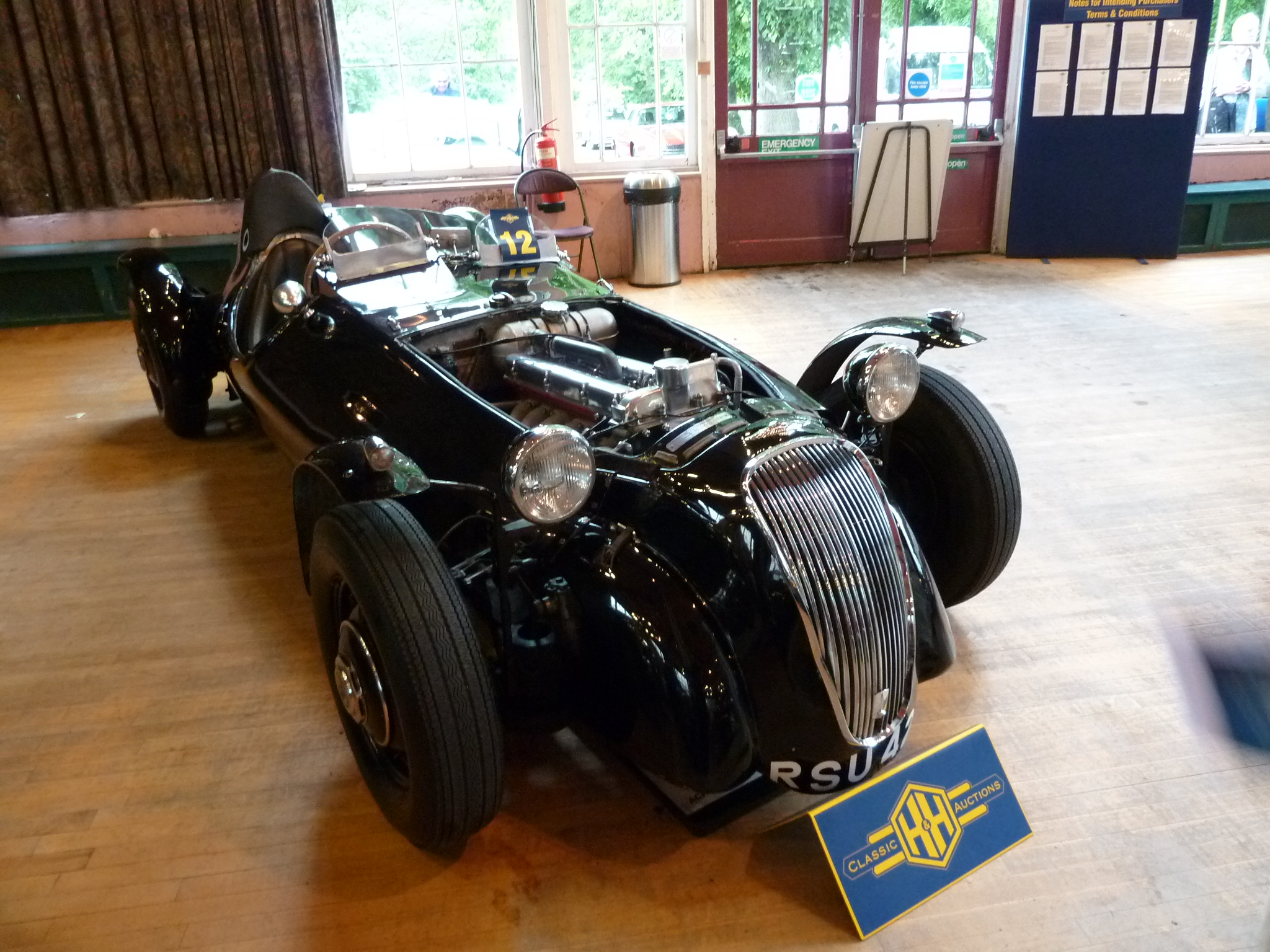
Prototype EX1
Drophead coupé by Tickford

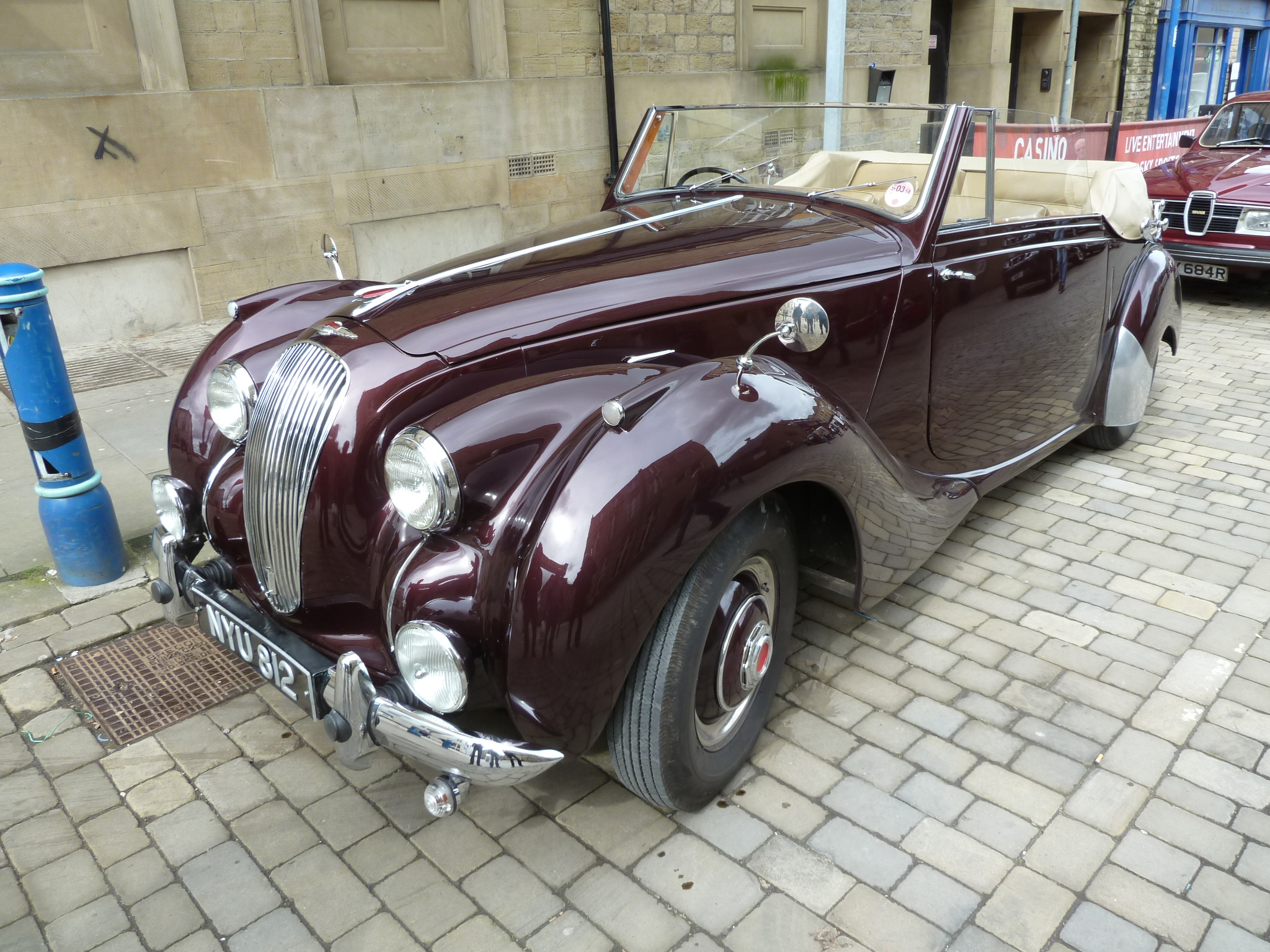

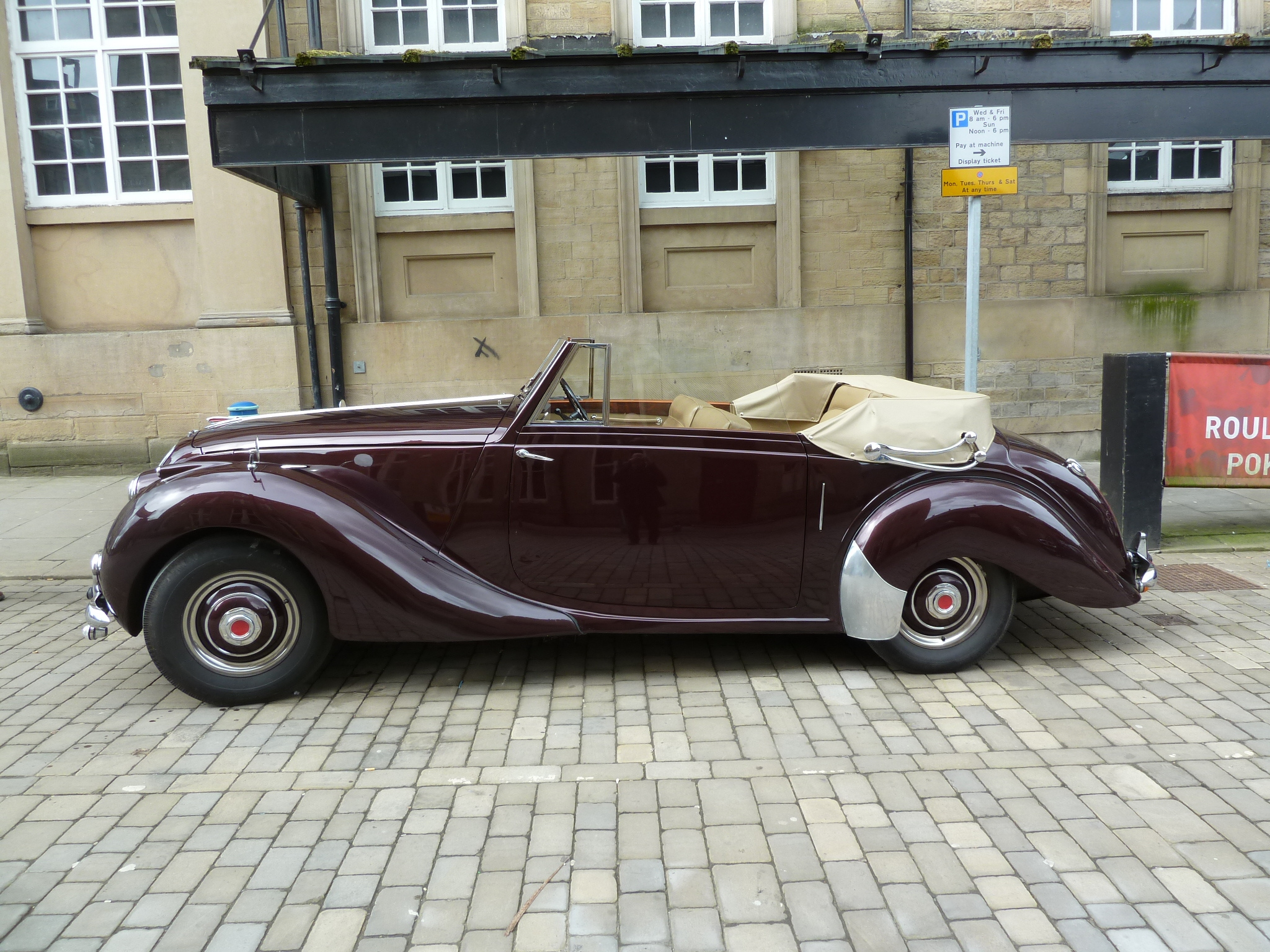

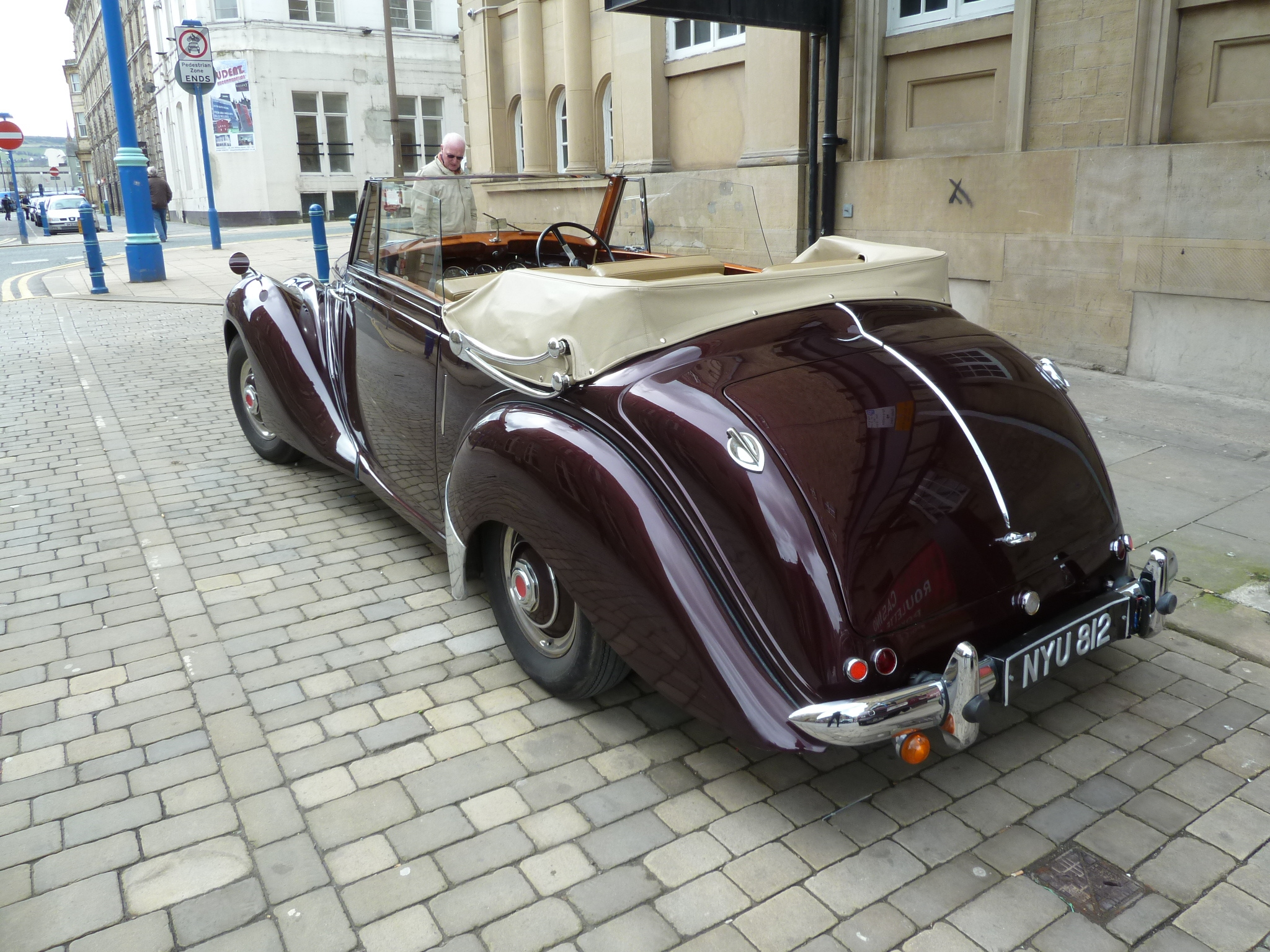

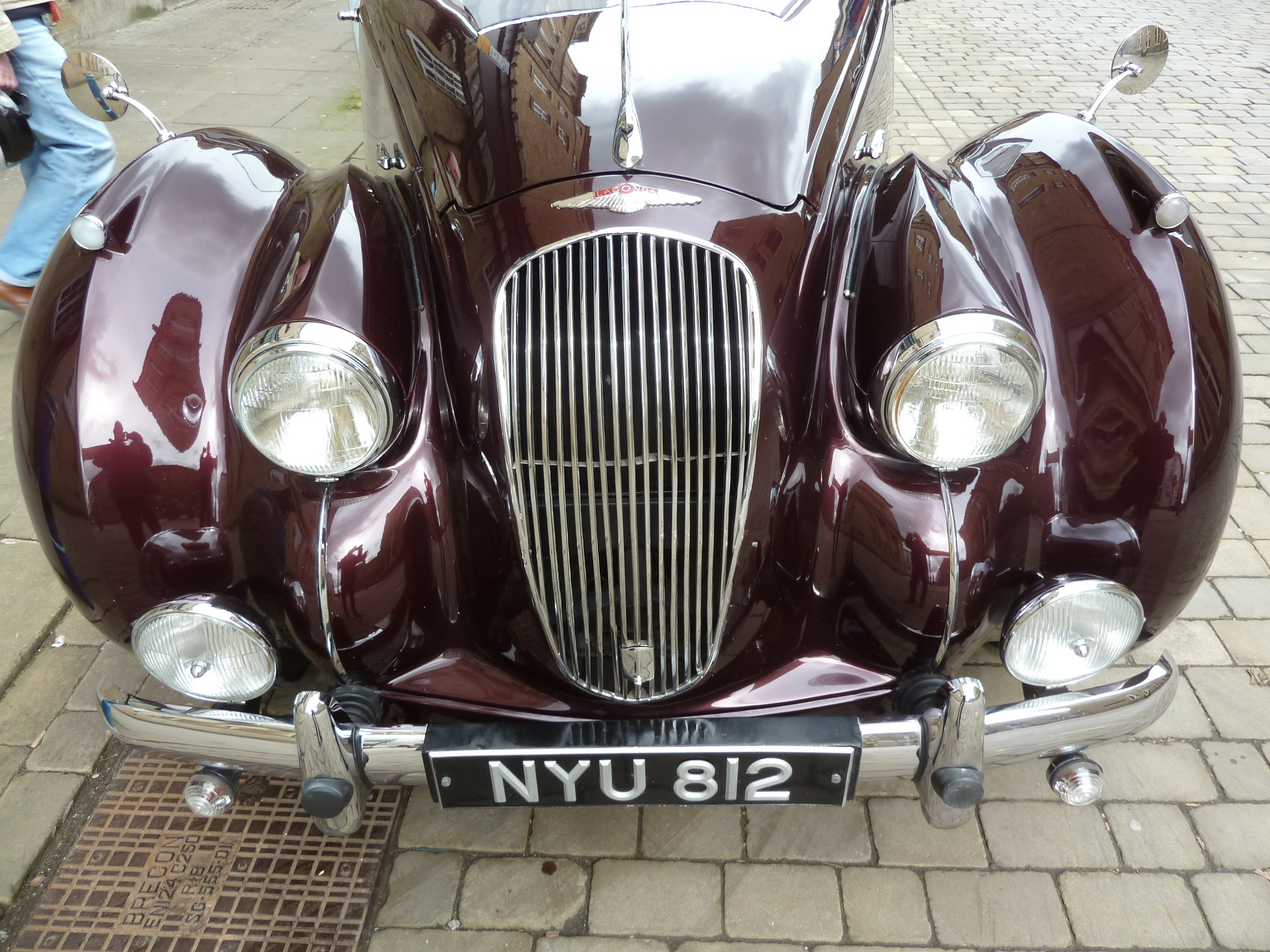

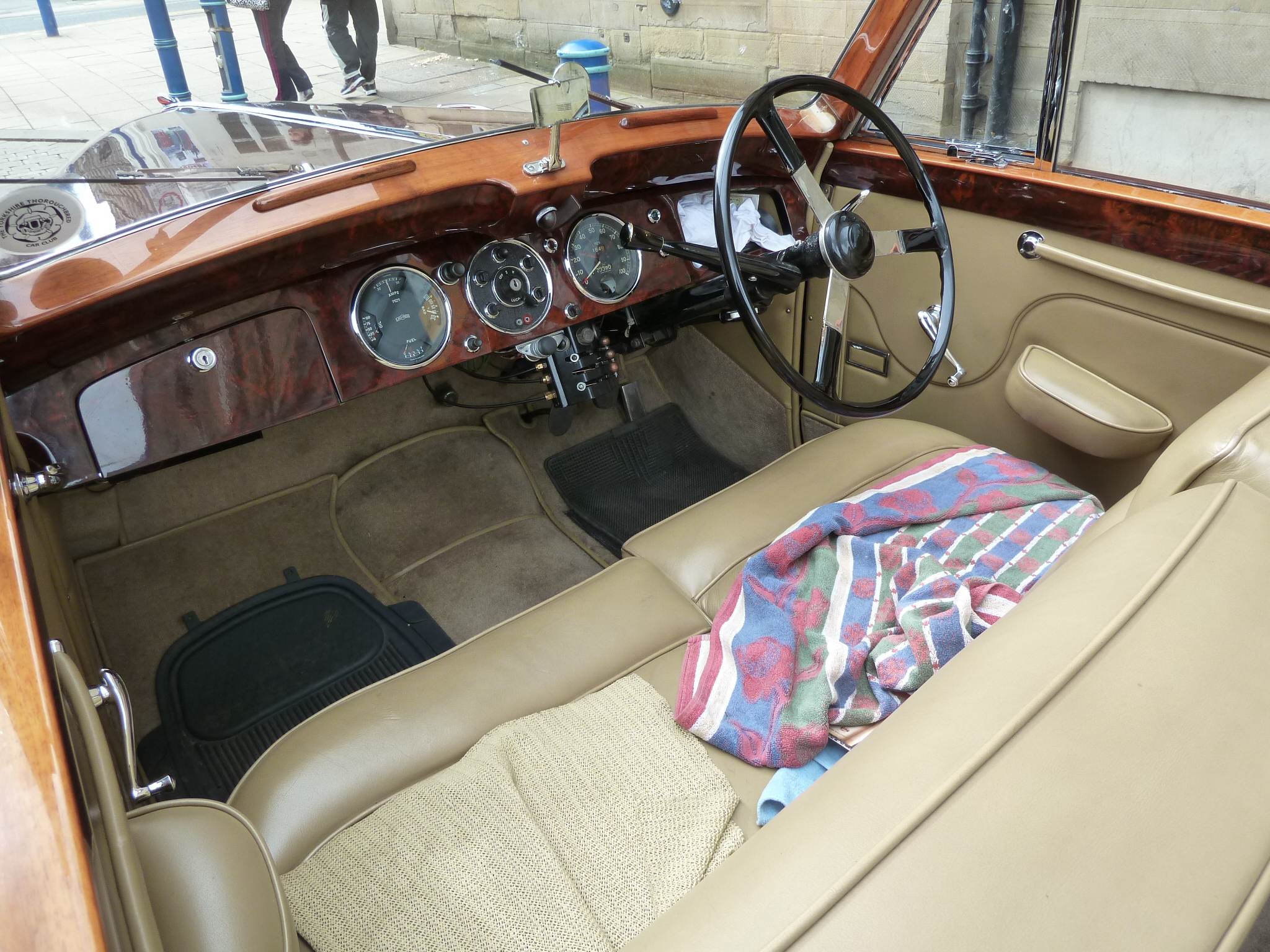
