= Lagonda 3-Litre =

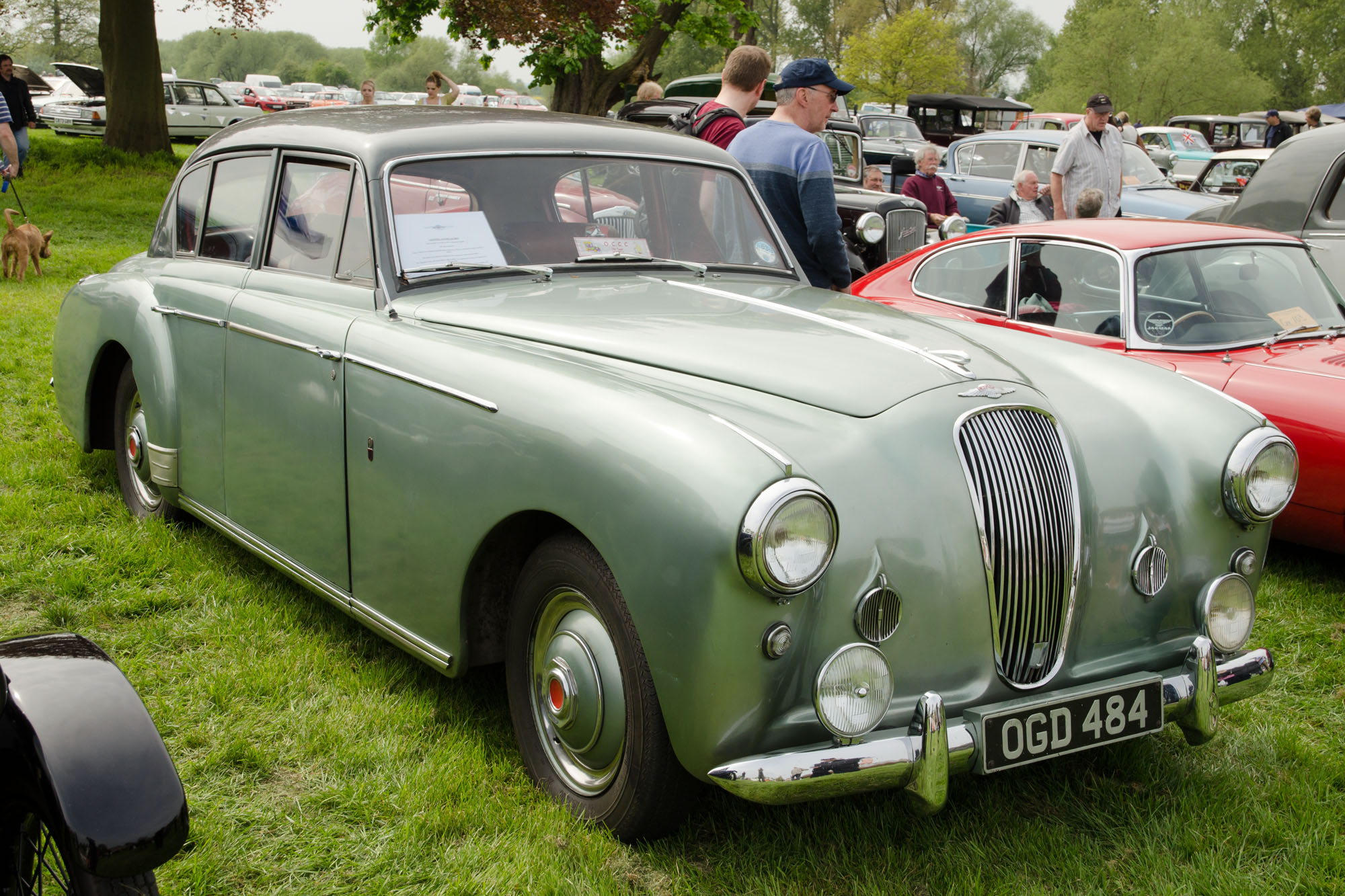
- 1955 Lagonda 3-Litre 4-door saloon

Overview
- Manufacturer: Aston Martin Lagonda
- Production: 1953–1958; 270 produced
- Assembly: United Kingdom: Feltham, Middlesex

Body and chassis
- Class: Luxury car
- Body style: 2-door 4-seat coupé; 4-door 4-seat saloon; 2-door 4-seat drophead coupé

Powertrain
- Engine: 2.9 L Lagonda I6'

Dimensions
- Wheelbase: 113.5 in (2,883 mm)
- Length: 195.5 in (4,966 mm)
- Width: 70 in (1,778 mm)
- Height: 62 in (1,575 mm)

Chronology
- Predecessor: Lagonda 2.6-Litre
- Successor: Lagonda Rapide

The Lagonda 3-Litre is an automobile which was produced by Aston Martin Lagonda from 1953 until 1958. It was the second Lagonda model of the David Brown/Aston Martin era. The 3-Litre was fitted with a higher displacement 2.9 L 140 bhp version of the twin overhead camshaft Lagonda Straight-6 engine designed by Walter Owen Bentley.

Like its predecessor, the 3-Litre was available as a 4-seat 2-door coupé, built by David Brown subsidiary engineering company Tickford or as a drophead coupé produced by the same coach builders. A 4-door saloon was introduced in 1954 and the 2-door coupé was discontinued in 1956. In early 1955, the Mark II version introduced a floor-mounted gear lever.

The car had a separate cruciform braced chassis and the suspension was independent all round, unusual for a car of its time, but utilising this form the previous 2.6-litre car, with the addition of a Jackall system. At the front there were coil springs and at the rear torsion bars and a swing axle. The Lockheed drum brakes, 12 in (305 mm) at the front and 11 in (279 mm) at the rear were servo assisted and steering was by a rack and pinion system with fore and aft adjustment on the steering column.

The interior was luxurious with polished walnut for the dashboard and door trims and leather seats, individual in the front and a bench at the rear with a central fold down arm rest. There were also adjustable arm rests on the front doors. A heater, radio and built in hydraulic jacks were standard equipment. Single or two tone paint schemes were available.

The 3-Litre was more expensive than its competitors and a total of just 270 of the three bodystyles were sold. The convertible ended production in 1957 (ca. 55 made), with the saloon following one year later. Despite the model's rarity, one Lagonda 3-Litre was destroyed in a "classic banger" race in 2014.

The Lagonda Rapide of 1961 was a final attempt to revive the Lagonda name as a luxury saloon counterpart to Aston Martin's GT cars.

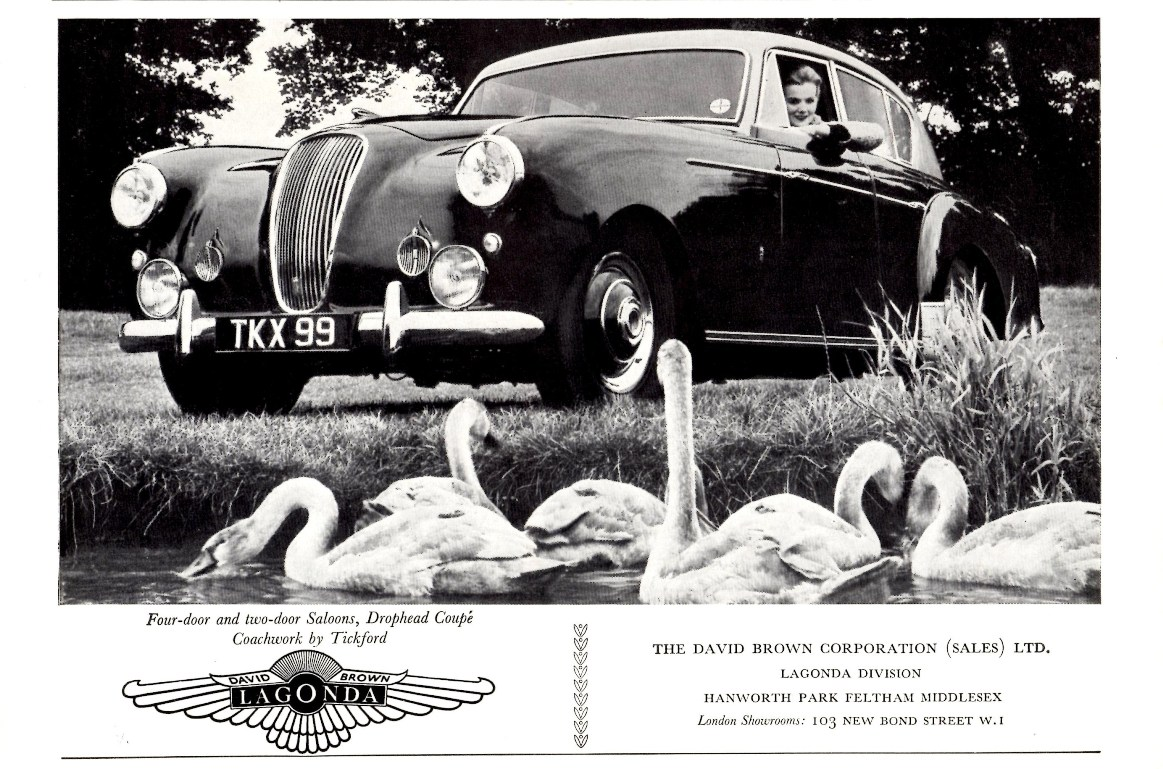
Lagonda 4-door saloon advertising

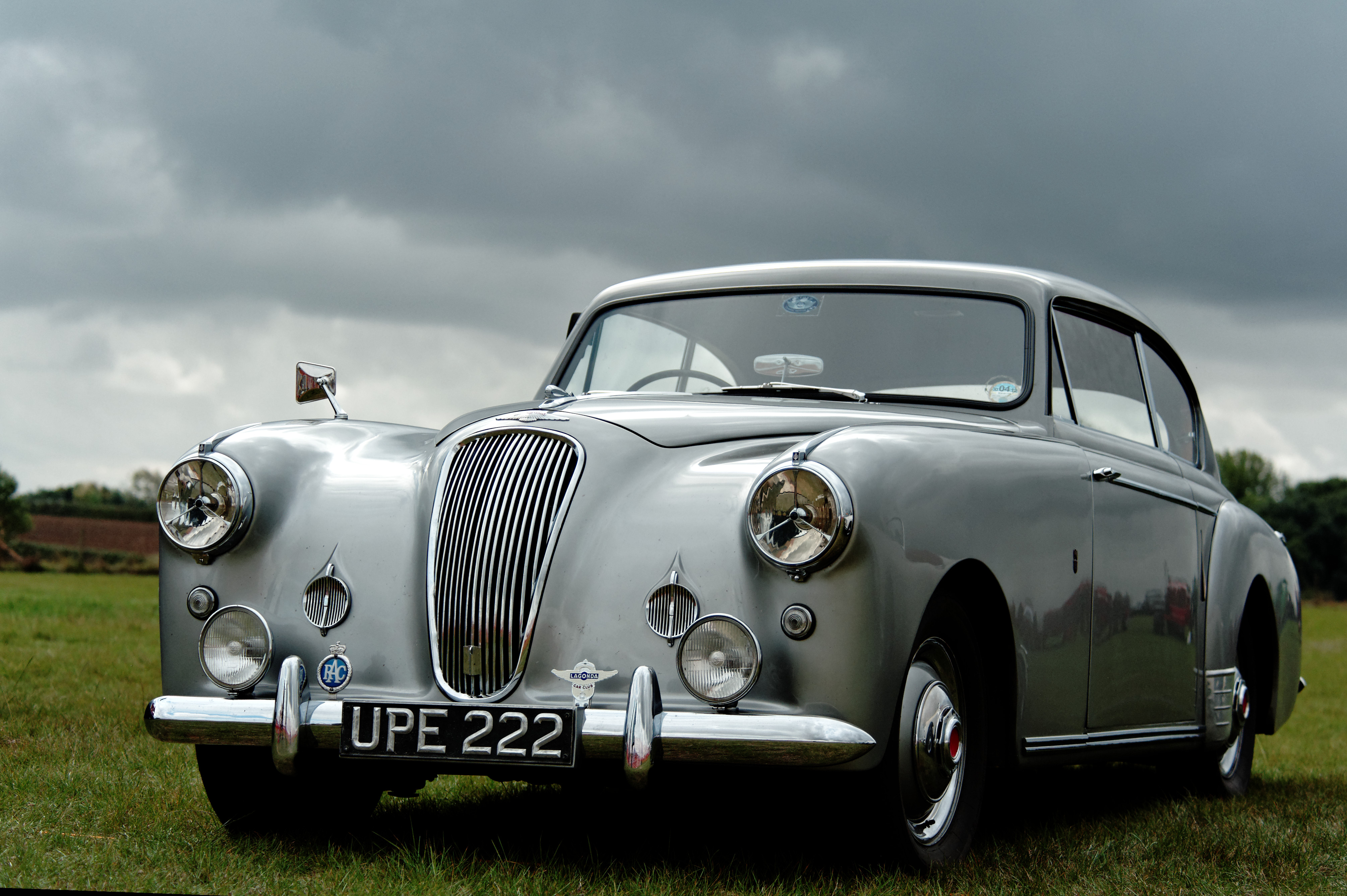
Lagonda 3-Litre 2-door sports saloon

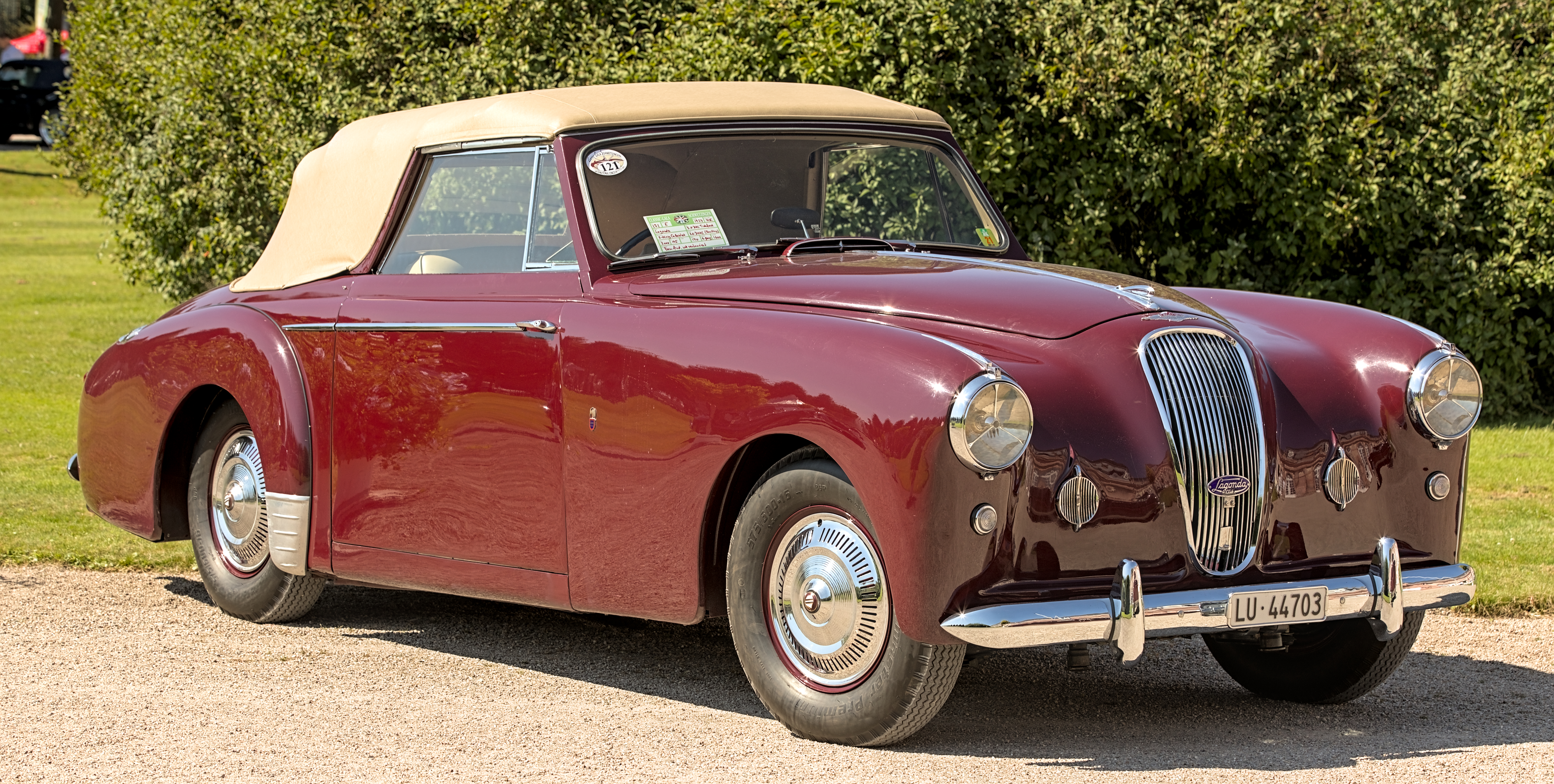
Lagonda 3-Litre drophead coupé by Tickford

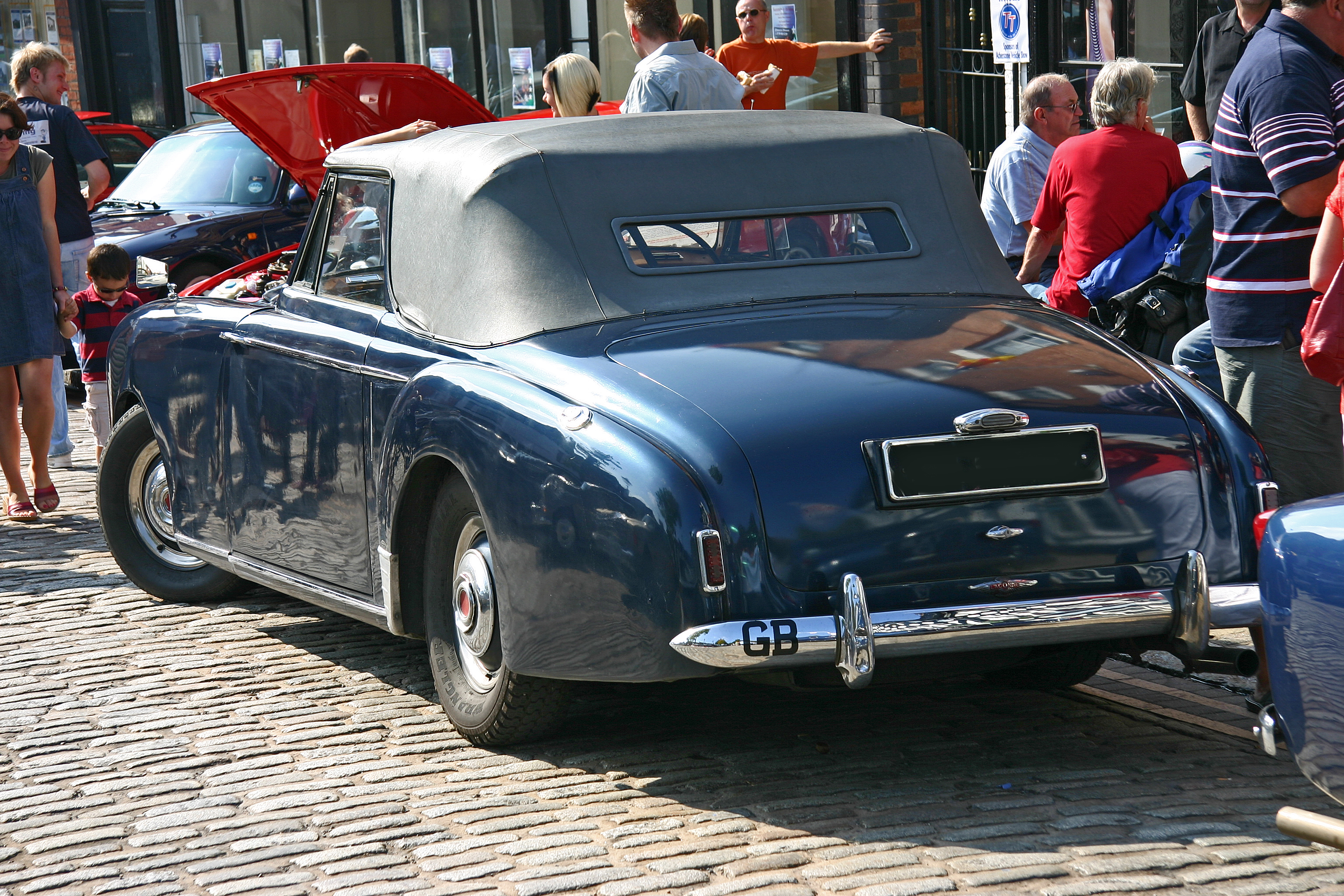
Lagonda 3-Litre drophead coupé by Graber (rear view)

== Performance ==
A car was tested by the British Motor magazine in 1956 and was found to have a top speed of 104 mph (167 km/h) and could accelerate from 0-60 mph (97 km/h) in 12.9 seconds. A fuel consumption of 19.9 miles per imperial gallon (14.2 L/100 km; 16.6 mpg_{‑US}) was recorded. The test car cost £2993 including taxes of £998.
