= Aston Martin DB Mark III =

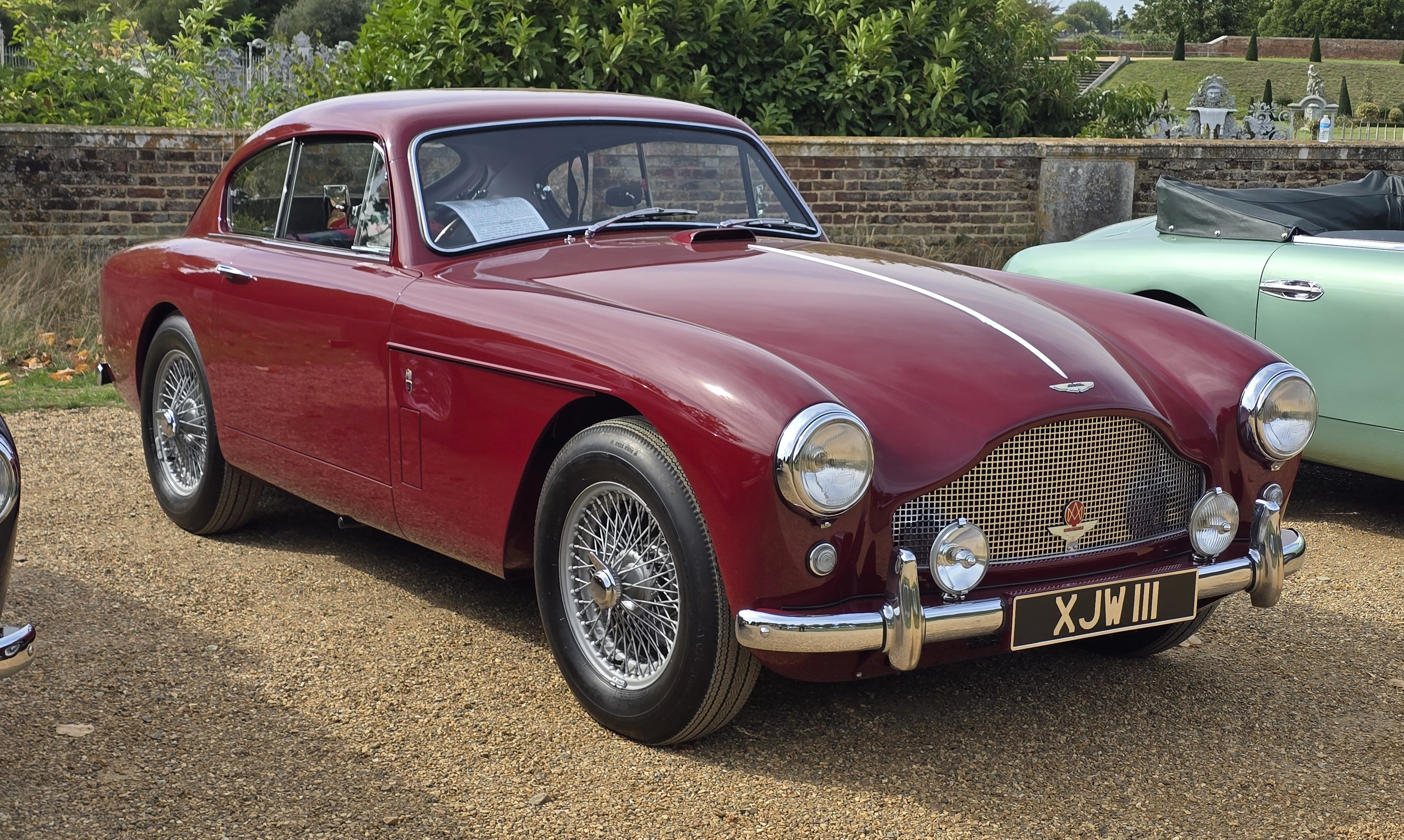
- 1958 Aston Martin DB Mark III

Overview
- Manufacturer: Aston Martin
- Production: 1957–1959; 551 produced
- Assembly: United Kingdom: Newport Pagnell, England
- Designer: John Turner

Body and chassis
- Class: Grand tourer
- Body style: 2+2 hatchback; 2-seat coupé; 2-seat drophead
- Layout: FR layout

Powertrain
- Engine: 2.9 L Lagonda I6

Dimensions
- Wheelbase: 99 in (2,515 mm)
- Length: 172 in (4,369 mm)
- Width: 65 in (1,651 mm)
- Height: 53.5 in (1,359 mm)
- Kerb weight: 3,000 lb (1,361 kg)

Chronology
- Predecessor: Aston Martin DB2/4 Mk II
- Successor: Aston Martin DB4

The Aston Martin DB Mark III (sometimes also referred to as the DB 2/4 Mark III) is a grand tourer sold by Aston Martin from 1957 until 1959. It was an evolution of the DB2/4 Mark II model it replaced, using an evolution of that car's 2.9-litre Lagonda straight-6 engine.

It was succeeded by the Aston Martin DB4 in 1958.

== Overview ==
Changes included the front grille (designed by Bert Thickpenny and first seen on the DB3S) that would become the shape of all future Aston Martin models, a new instrument panel that replicated the shape of the grille, and after the first 100 cars Girling disc brakes. The hydraulically operated clutch was new as well, and an optional Laycock-de Normanville overdrive was offered with the standard four-speed gearbox, even an automatic transmission was available. Worm-and-sector steering and a live axle rear end were carryovers. The hatchback bodystyle used on over five sixths of the Mark IIIs built, complete with fold-down rear seats, had been first introduced in the 2/4 MkI in 1953. At the rear, the DB2/4 Mark II's tailfins grew (after the 100 cars) and were altered to use the larger Lucas rear lights from the Humber Hawk which were also used on the Alvis TD21.

At the time Aston Martin had already started to consider a replacement for the Frank Feeley designed DB2 series of cars ultimately resulting in the DB4. However, a quick update of the DB2/4 was also necessary and young designer John Turner, who was 17 at the time, suggested grafting the front of the DB3S onto the rear of the DB2/4. Thus the basic design for the DB Mark III was conceived.

The Willie Watson/W.O. Bentley-designed 2.9 L (2,922 cc; 178.3 cu in) Lagonda straight-6 engine, redesigned by Tadek Marek, was carried over from the DB2/4 Mark II predecessor. The standard DBA engine with twin SU carburettors produced 162 bhp (121 kW), though an optional dual-exhaust system raised this to a reputed 178 bhp (133 kW). Thus equipped, the car could reach 60 mph (97 km/h) in 9.3 seconds and hit 120 mph (193 km/h).

A mid-level DBD option with triple SU 1.75-inch carbs and dual exhaust produced 180 bhp (134 kW), and was fitted to 47 cars.

A high-output DBB engine with three twin-choke Weber 35 DCO 3 carburettors, special long duration camshafts, high compression 8.6:1 pistons and the dual-exhaust system was rated at 195 bhp (145 kW) and ordered on just 10 cars.

One car was fitted with the special DBC competition engine with a reputed 214 bhp (160 kW), this was fitted with racing camshafts, special connecting rods, very high compression pistons (possibly 9.5:1) & three twin-choke Weber 45 DCO 3 carburettors.

Girling disc brakes were fitted as standard to the front wheels of all Mark III Astons after the first 100 had been made. Many cars were upgraded later. Only five automatic cars were made from a total of 551.

A 1959 review by The US automobile magazine Road & Track praised the car for everything but its $7,450 price. "A car for connoisseurs," they called it. "The Aston has many virtues and few faults." Among the faults was too-heavy steering effort, high door sills, and a stiff ride.

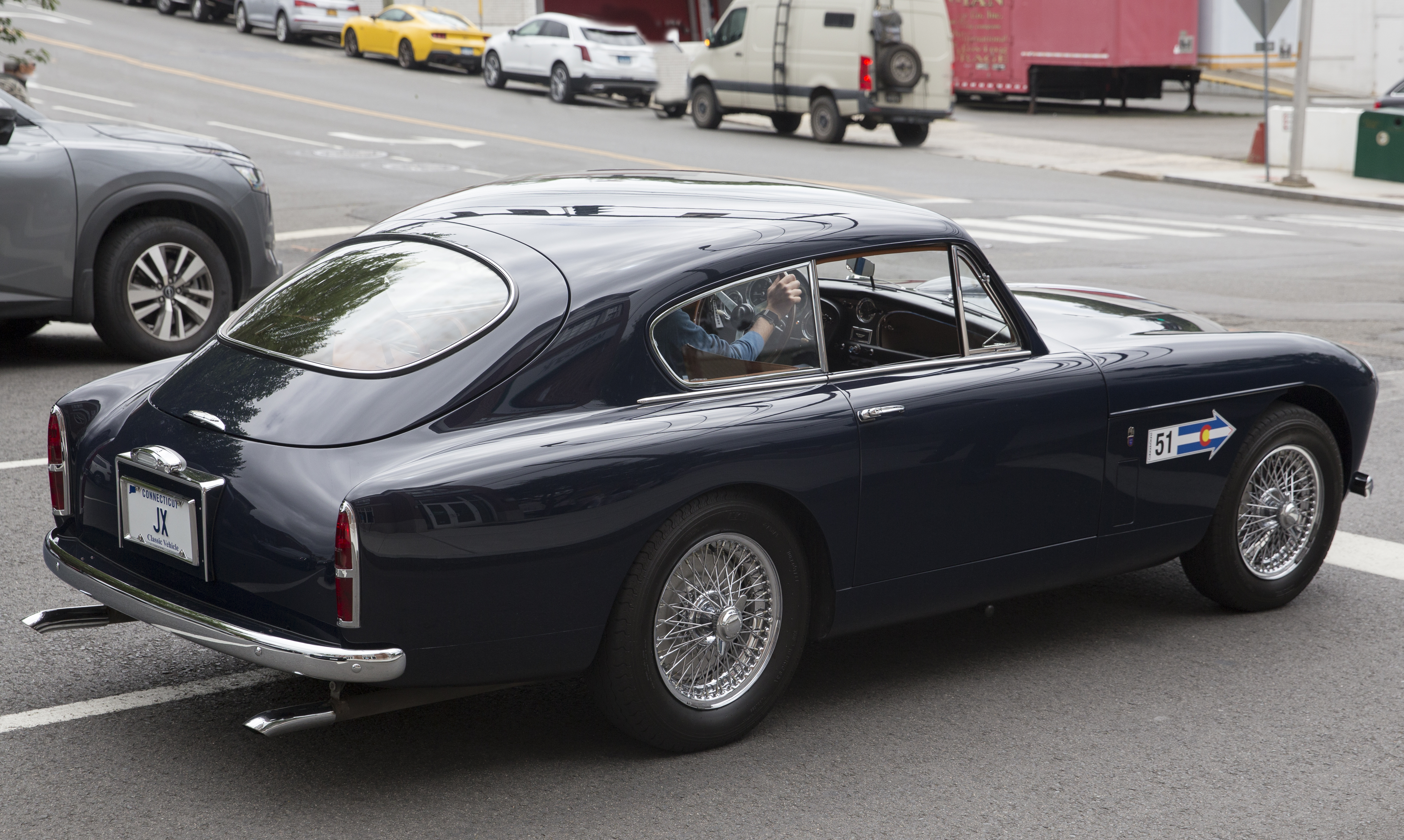
The DB Mark III featured a hatchback body first seen on the DB2/4

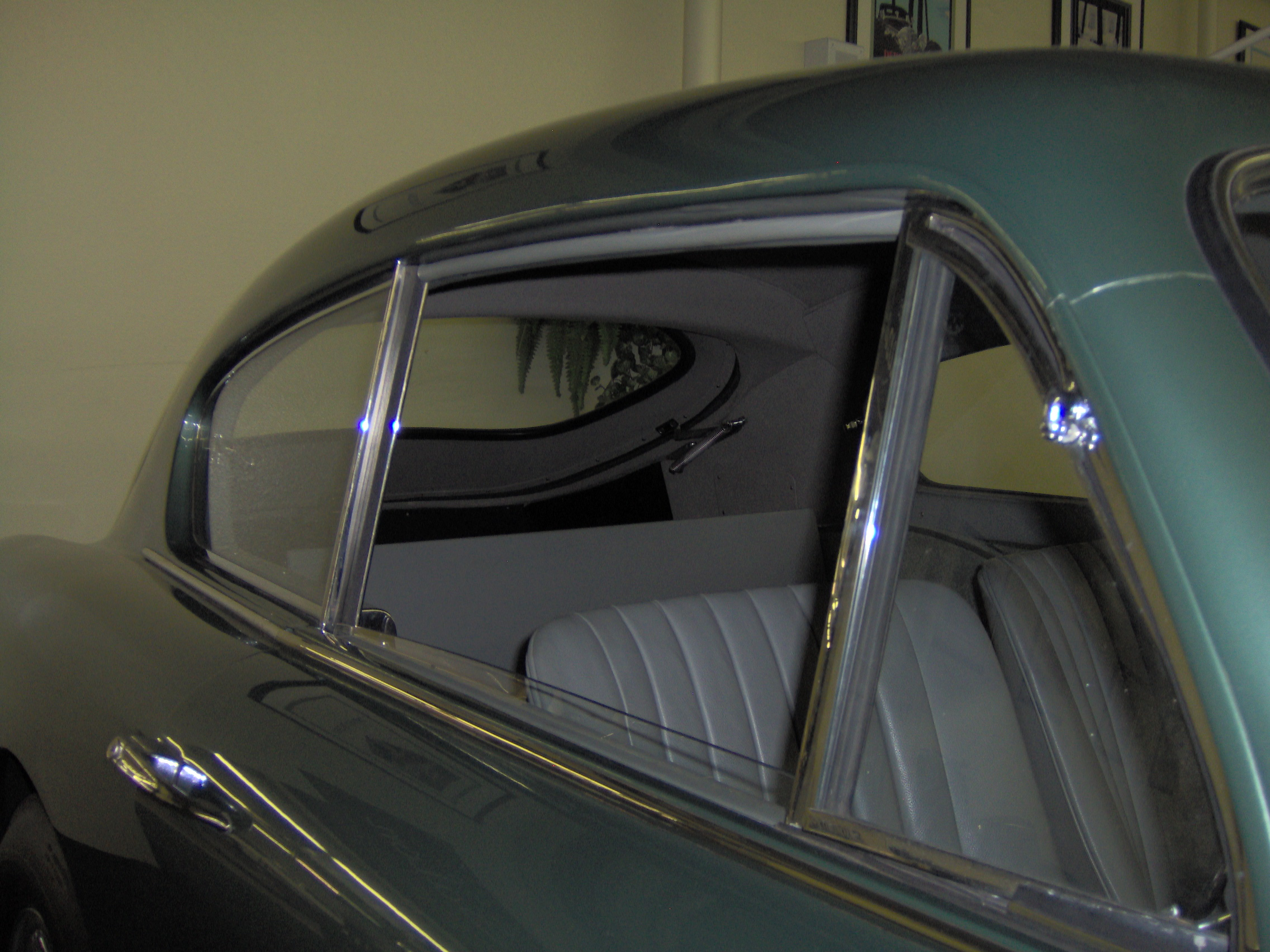
The hatch's struts and springs are visible from inside

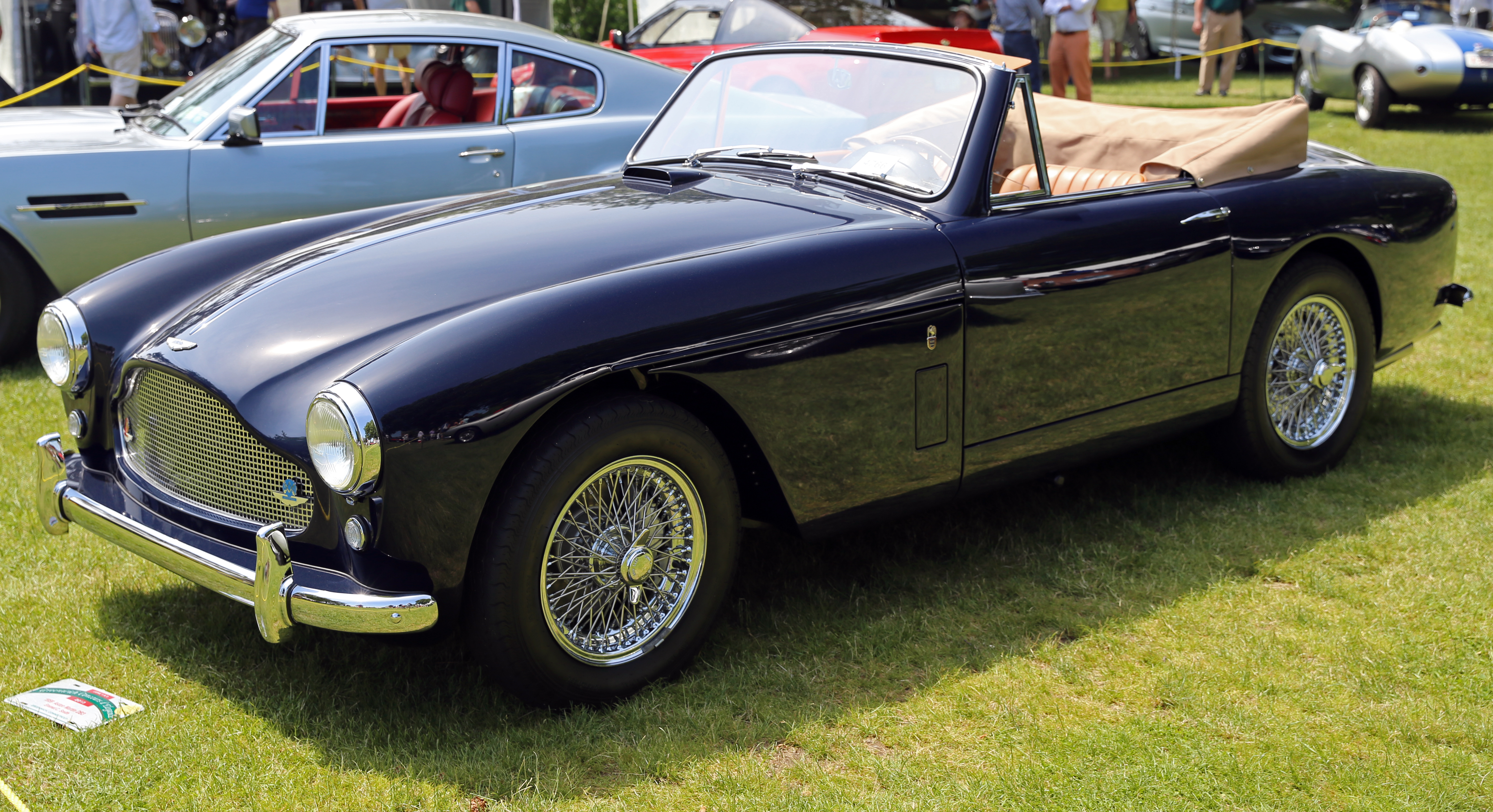
1959 DB Mark III Drophead Coupé with the DBD engine

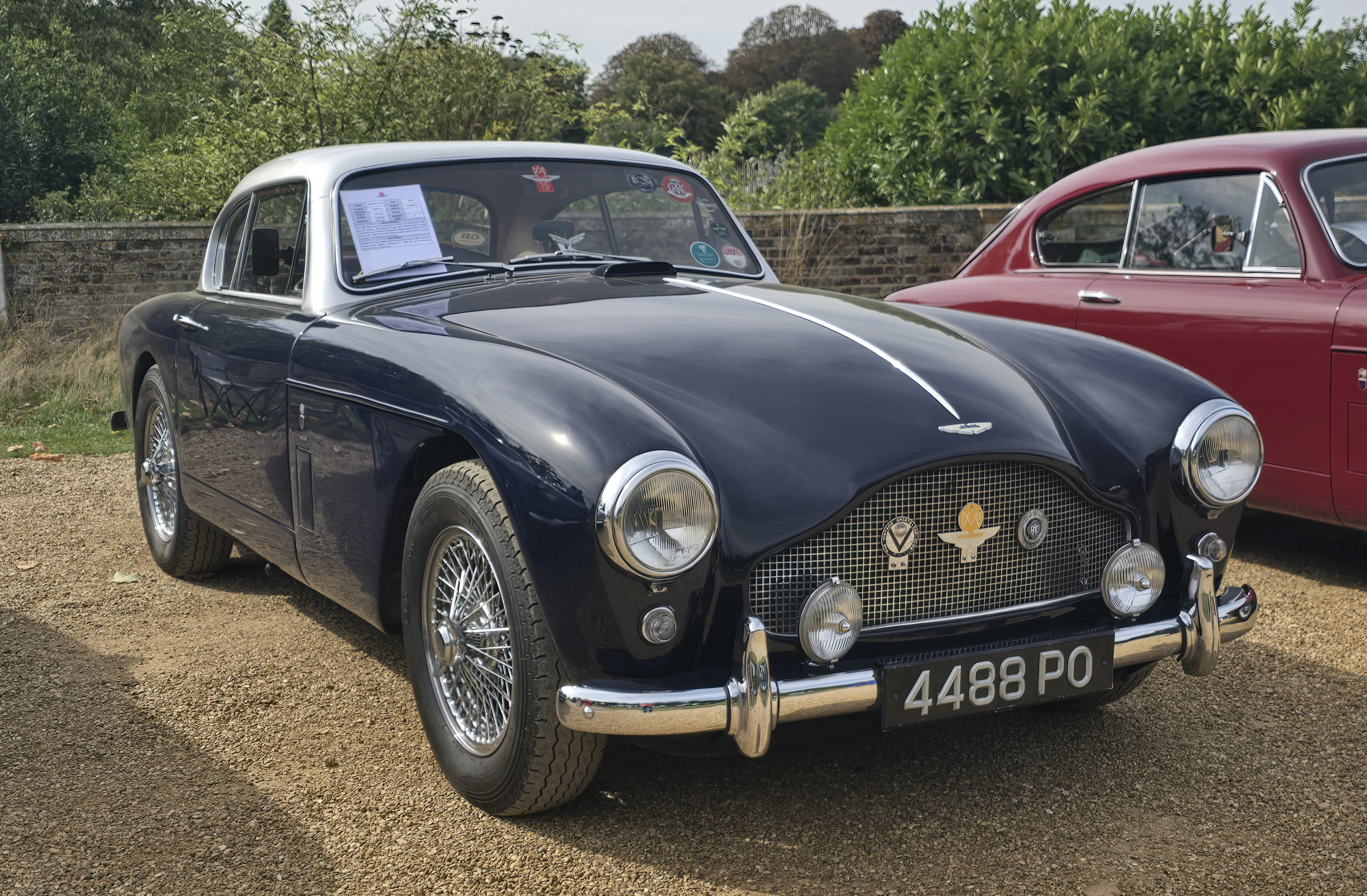
One of the five Fixed Head Coupés built

== Coupé, convertible ==
Along with the hatchback, two two-seater coupé variants of the Mark III were also produced. A "drophead coupé" convertible, while not common, still considerably outnumbers the "fixed head coupé" – 84 of the former were produced, while just five of the latter were built. All five Fixed Head Coupés were built close to the end of Mark III production and feature the mid-spec DBD engine. Both of these body styles feature conventional hinged boot lids rather than the innovative hatchback.

== James Bond ==
James Bond drives an Aston Martin DB Mark III in the novel version of Goldfinger, though it is referred to as a "DB III" in the book – the chapter in which he drives to his famous golf-course encounter with the villain is entitled 'Thoughts in a DB III'. It is the only Bond car in the Ian Fleming novels to have gadgets installed. For the film adaptation five years later, the car was updated to the Aston Martin DB5 model and the array of gadgetry was much expanded; that model would become one of the most iconic classic cars as a result.

== Production ==
- DB Mark III: 551
  - Hatchback: 462
  - Drophead Coupé: 84
    - DBA: 68
    - DBB: 2
    - DBD: 14
  - Fixed Head Coupé: 5

LHD: 83

== Die-cast models ==
The DB Mk III was included in the Spot-on range in the early 1960s.

Oxford Die-Cast have issued models of both the hatchback and the drophead.

Spark Models have issued 1/43 models of the drophead, labelled "DB2/4 Cabriolet 1959".
