= Aston Martin Rapide Bertone Jet 2+2 =

Aston Martin Bertone Jet 2+2
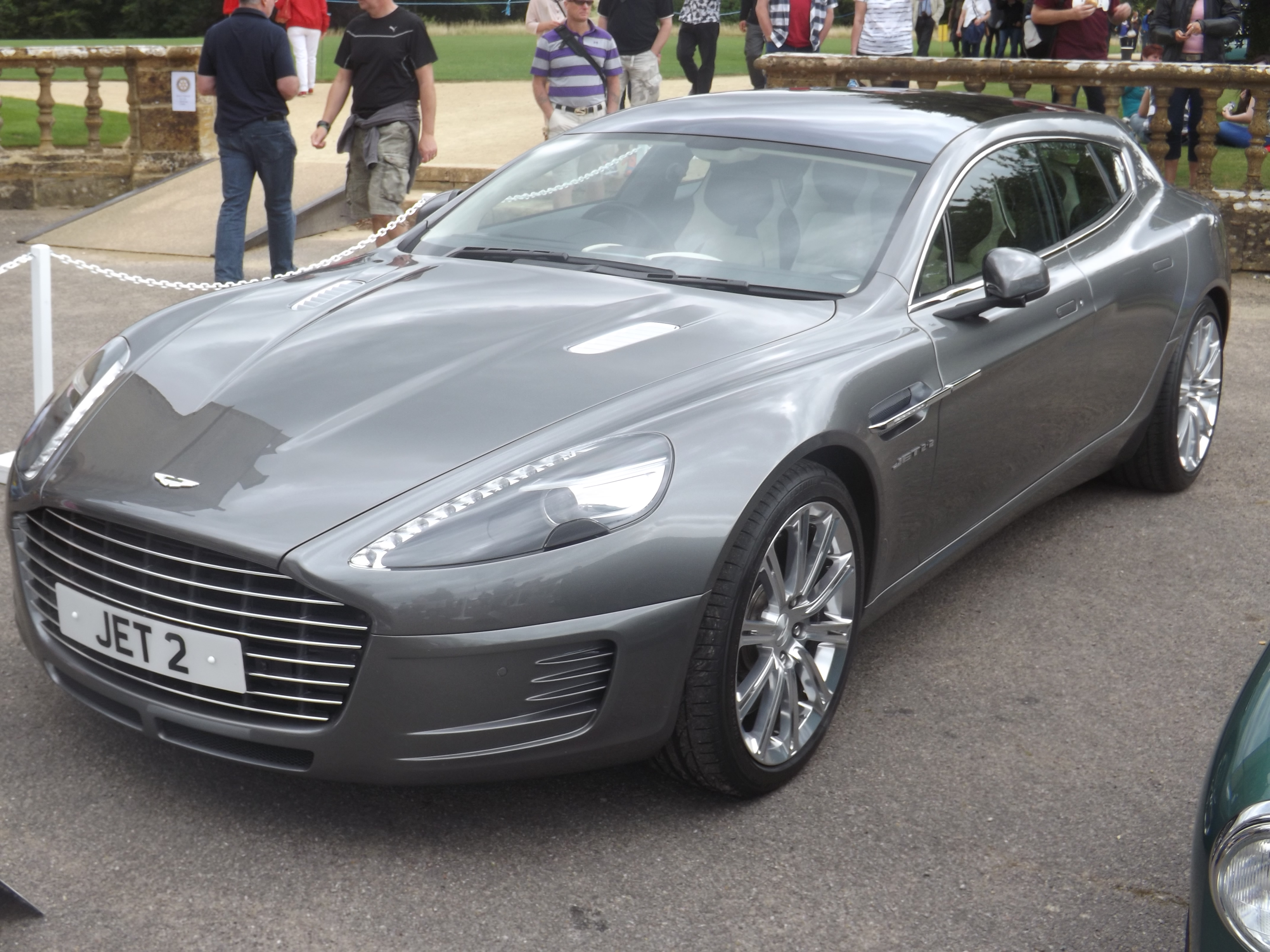

Overview
- Manufacturer: Aston Martin Lagonda Limited; Gruppo Bertone
- Production: 2013
- Assembly: United Kingdom: Gaydon, Warwickshire (original assembly); Italy: Turin (coach building)
- Designer: Barry Weir; Mike Robinson

Body and chassis
- Class: Grand tourer (S)
- Body style: 5-door shooting brake
- Layout: Front mid-engine, rear-wheel-drive
- Platform: VH Generation IV
- Doors: Swan doors
- Related: Aston Martin Rapide; Aston Martin DB4 GT Jet

Powertrain
- Engine: 5.9 L V12
- Transmission: 6-speed ZF 6HP 26 (Touchtronic II) automatic

The Aston Martin Rapide Bertone Jet 2+2 is a one-off shooting brake designed by car enthusiast Barry Weir and the last ever vehicle to be built by car maker Bertone. It was shown at the 2013 Geneva Motor Show.

The car was intended as a one-off special only but considering the positive response, Bertone decided to put the car into small scale production. The company went into receivership shortly after and the production run did not come to fruition. The Bertone Jet 2+2 pays homage to the original Aston Martin DB4 GT Jet which was launched in 1961.

== History ==
The project was undertaken at the request of renowned car collector Barry Weir in the summer of 2012. Mr Weir designed the car on the back of a serviette as he came up with the idea of reshaping the back of an Aston Martin Rapide to turn it into a shooting brake vehicle. The rear of the car took three and a half months to design and the final design was frozen because Aston Martin's chief designer Marek Reichman urged the designers at Bertone to use the updated grille design of the Rapide for the front of the car.

The final design was shown to the design team at Aston Martin and after approval, a full size clay model was built in order to smoothen out any imperfections. After the design was finalised, the coach work was performed by hand and the car was completed in 2013. The Aston Martin Jet 2+2 was unveiled to critical acclaim at the 2013 Geneva Motor Show.

== Specifications ==
The Bertone Jet features aluminium body panels shaped by hand and carbon fibre body work. The car also features a panoramic sunroof made entirely of glass and folding rear seats. A roof dimming system was said to have been in development as well as electric folding rear seats. The headroom is improved at the rear seats due to the car's shooting brake body style but the legroom remains the same because the engineers and designers did not want to change the overall proportions of the donor car. The car's mechanical components remain unchanged and it utilises the same 5.9-litre V12 engine found in a Rapide while having the same weight at 1,990 kg (4,387 lb).

The rear lights are similar to the Vanquish and a small integrated rear spoiler is installed to improve aerodynamics.

== Gallery ==
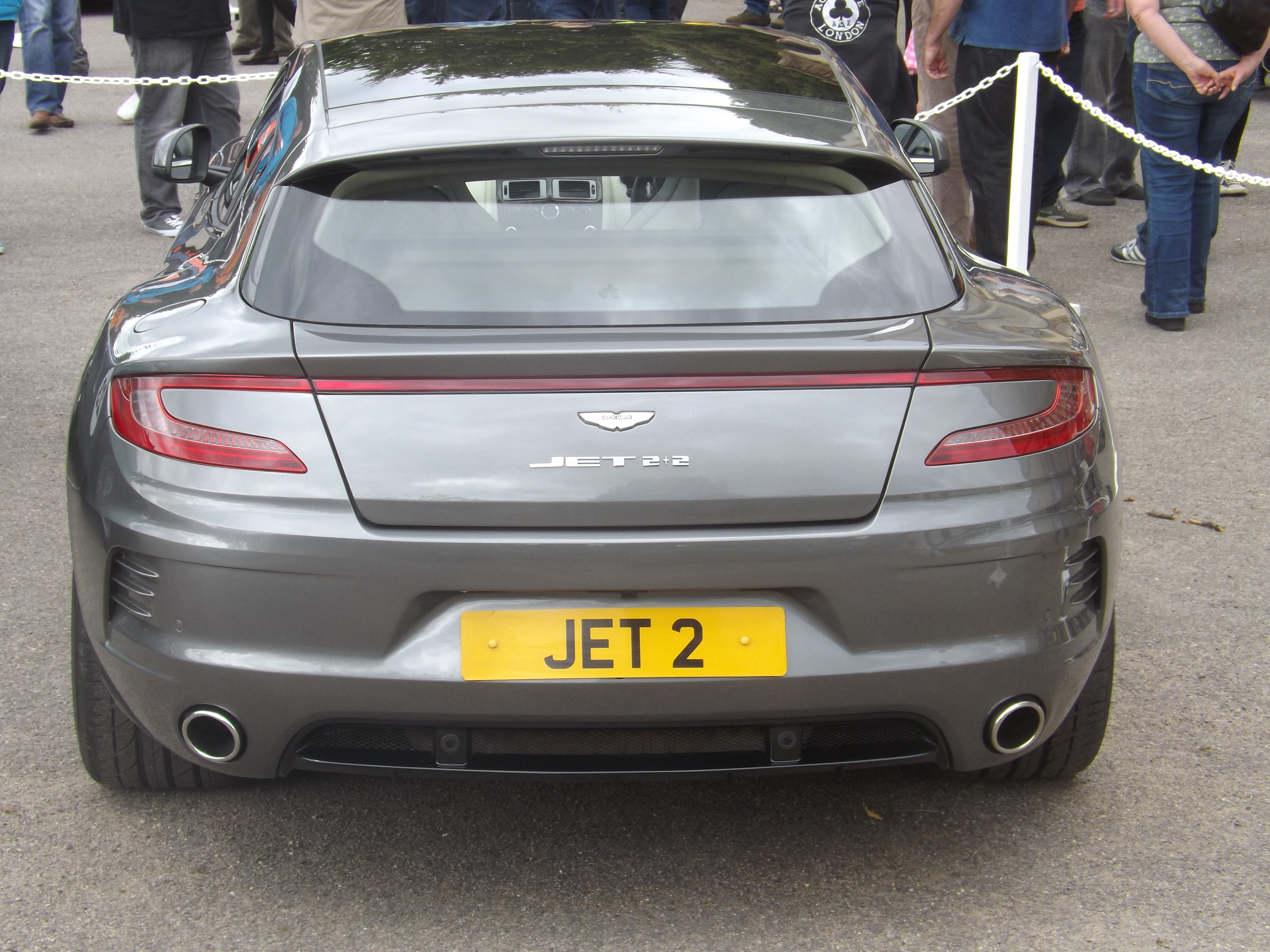
Rear view

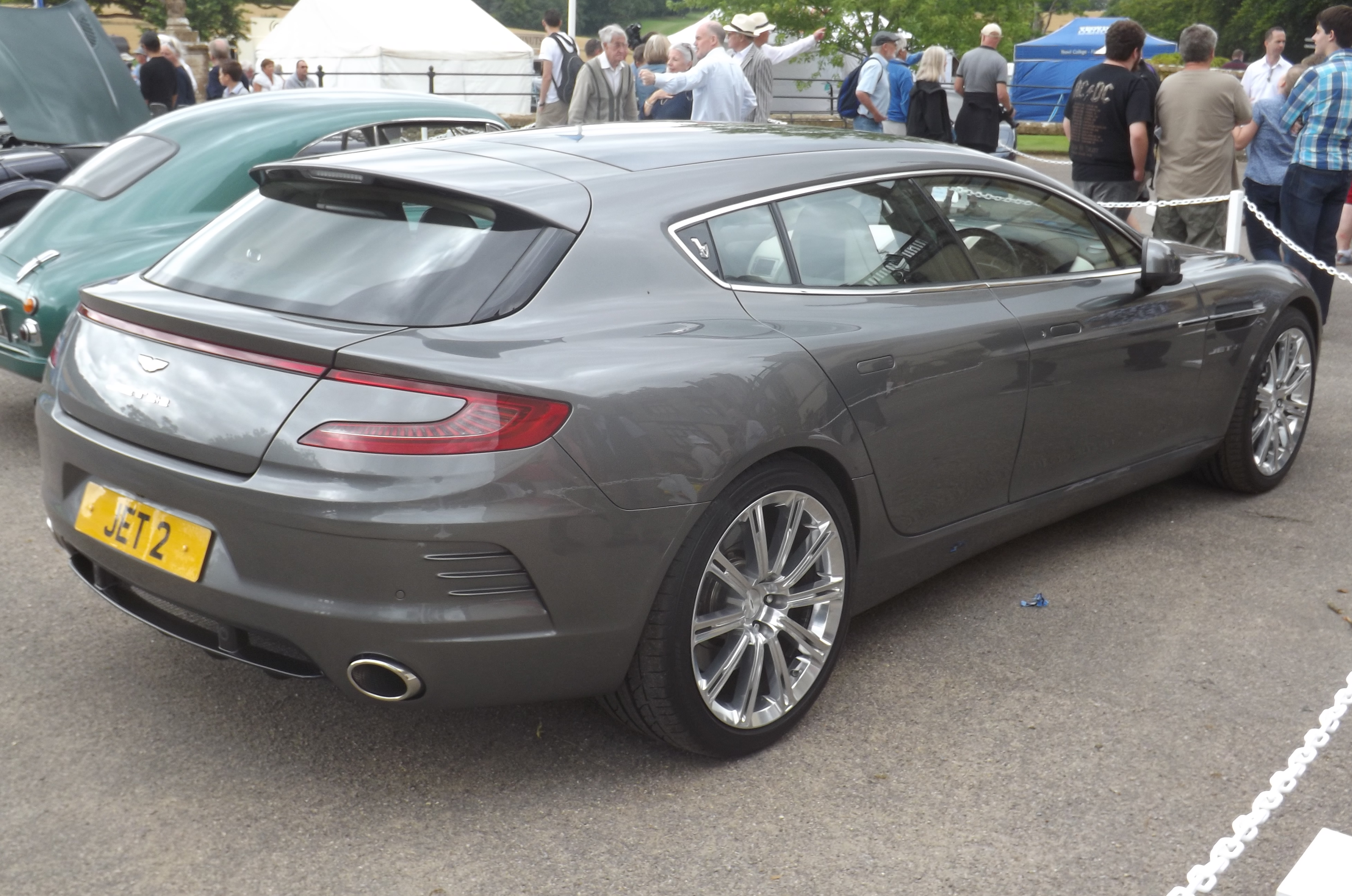
Three-quarter view

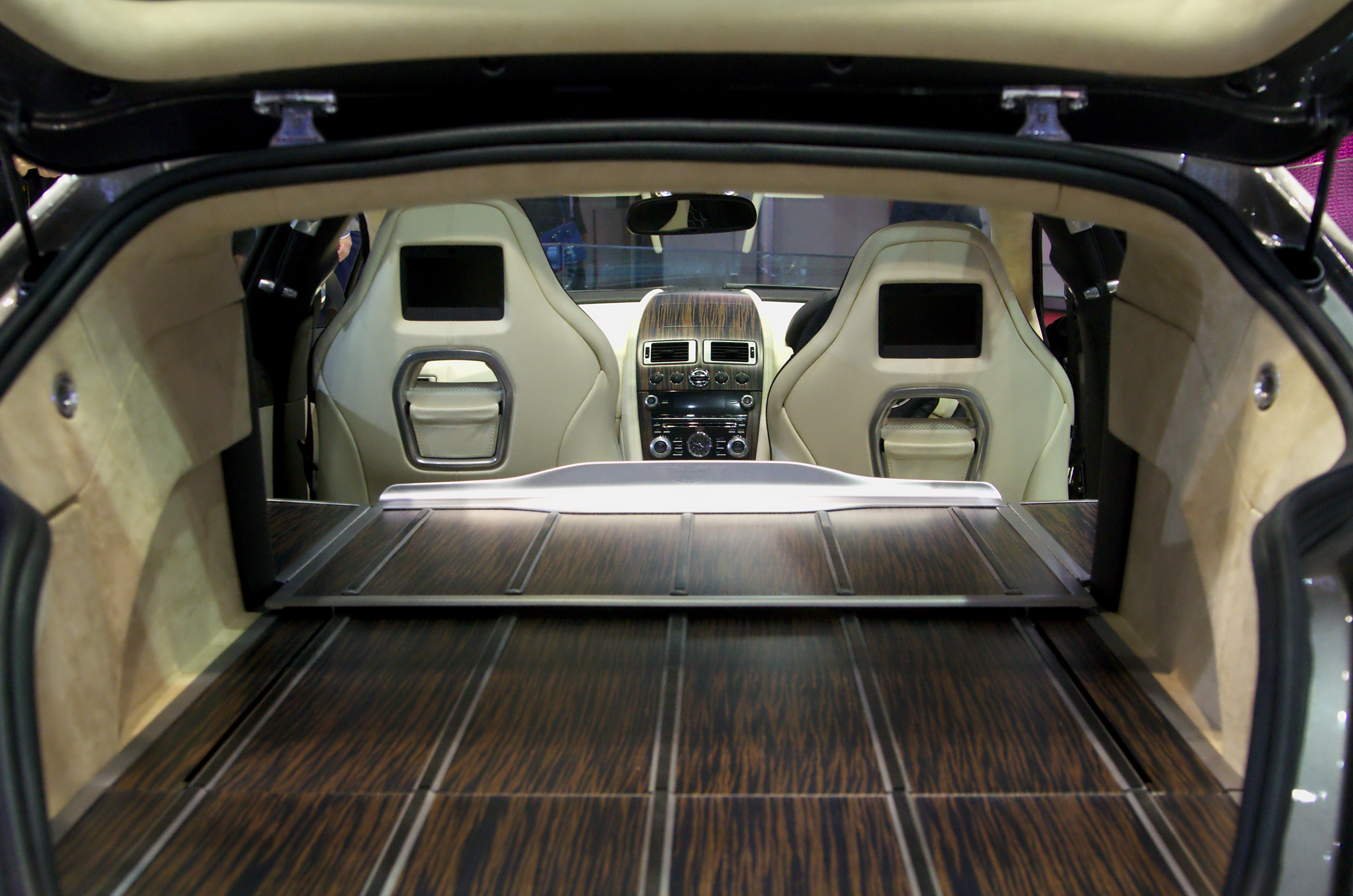
Interior (rear)

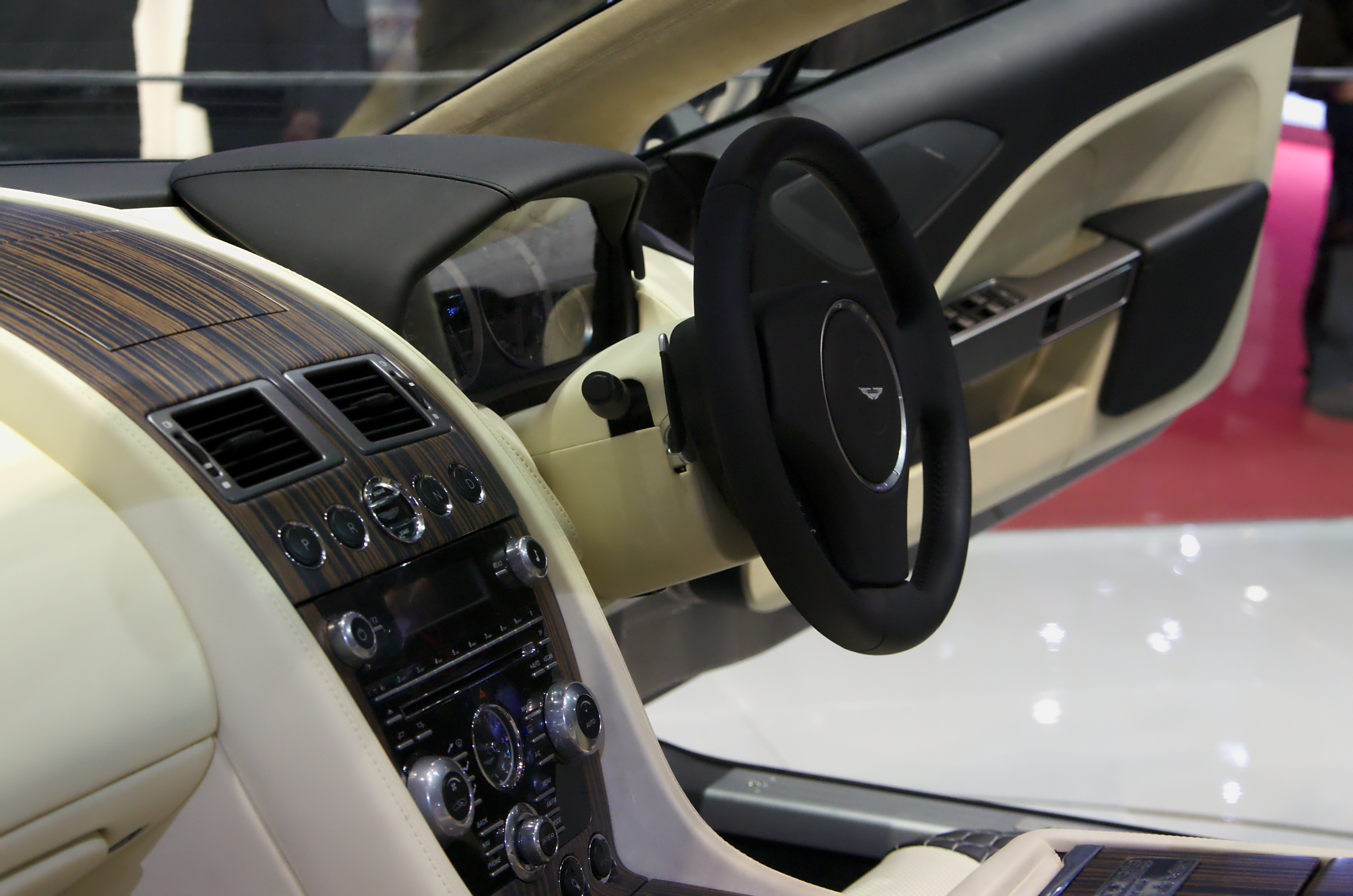
Interior (front)

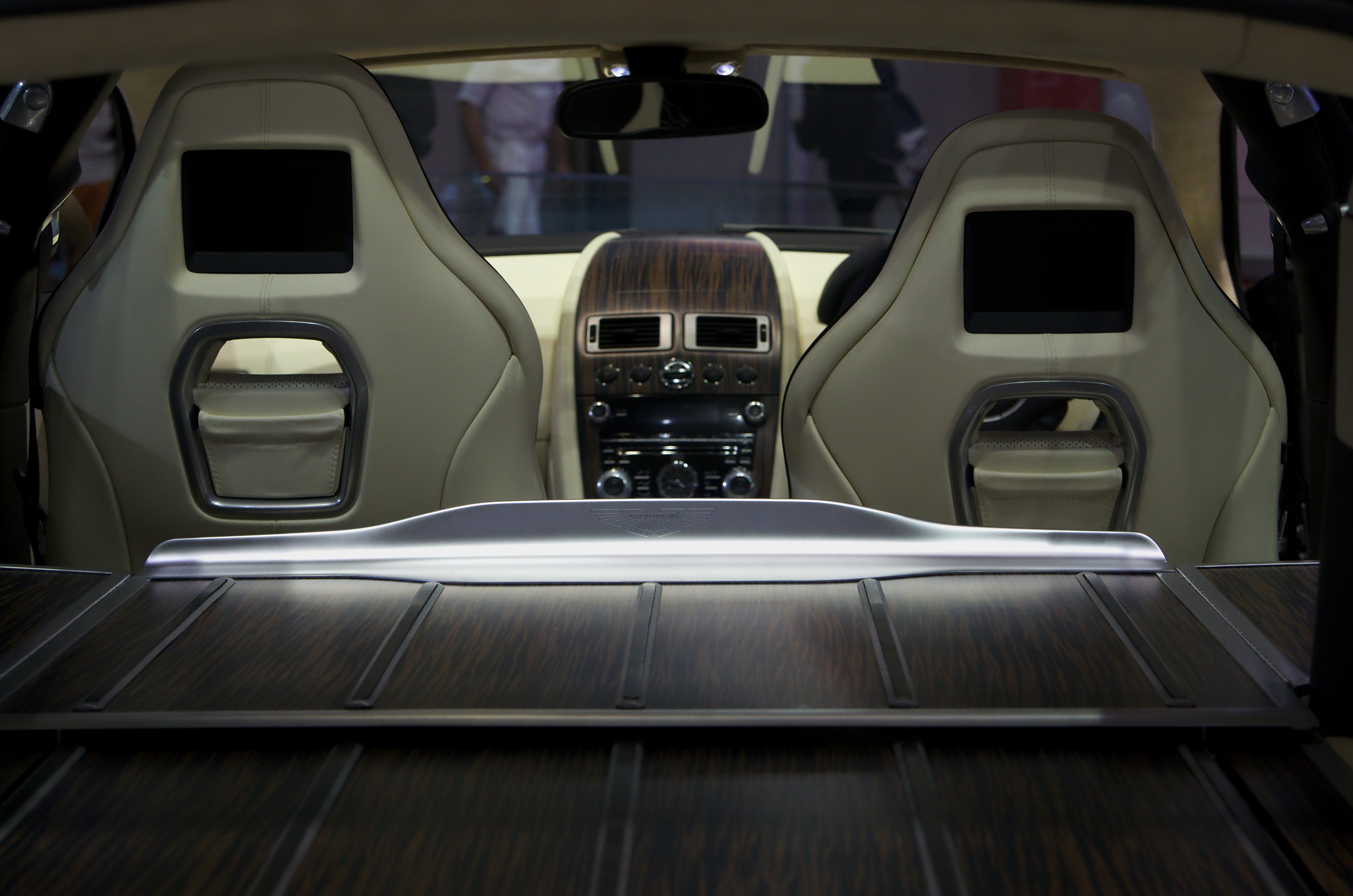
Interior (center)

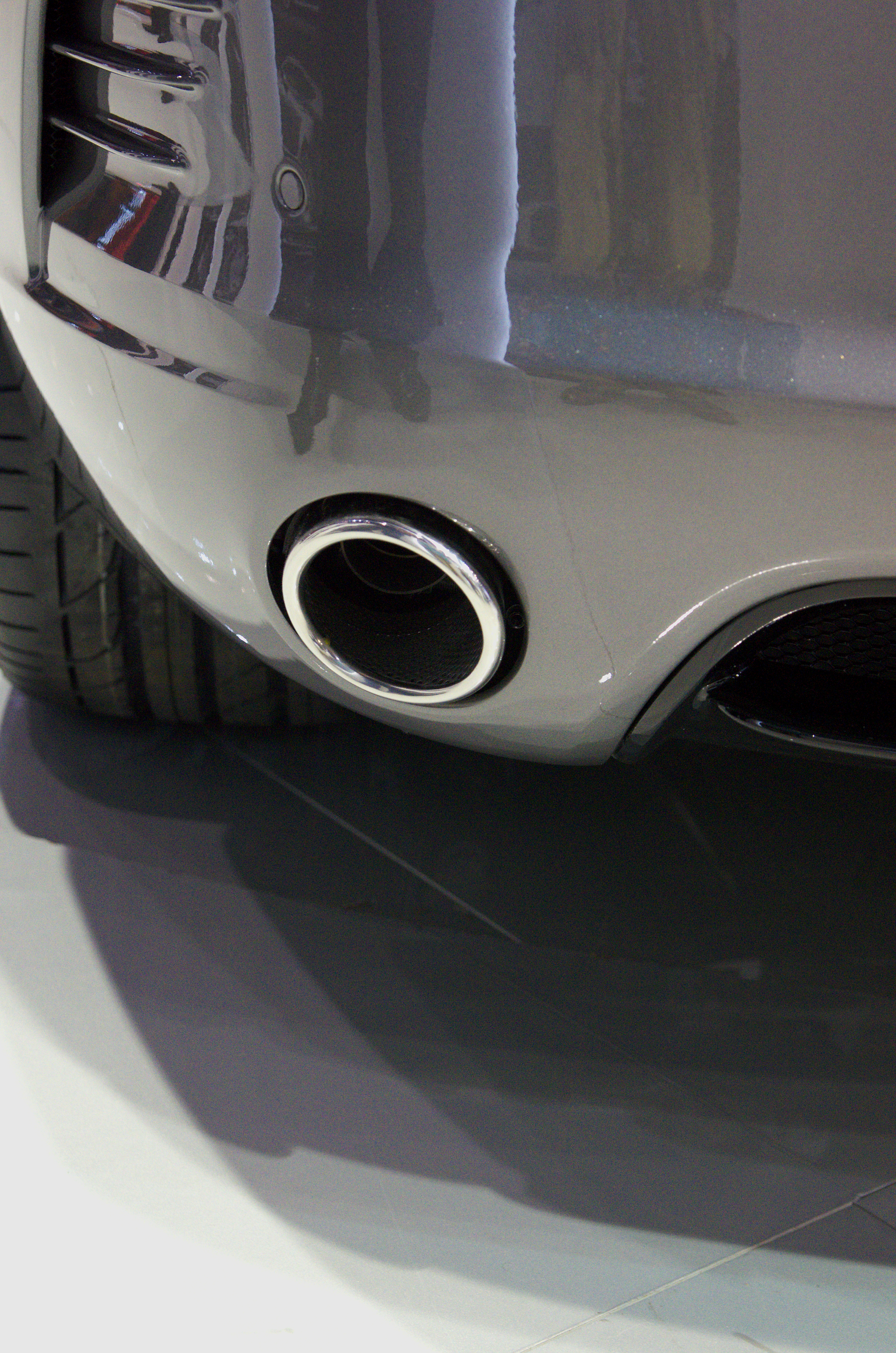
Exhaust

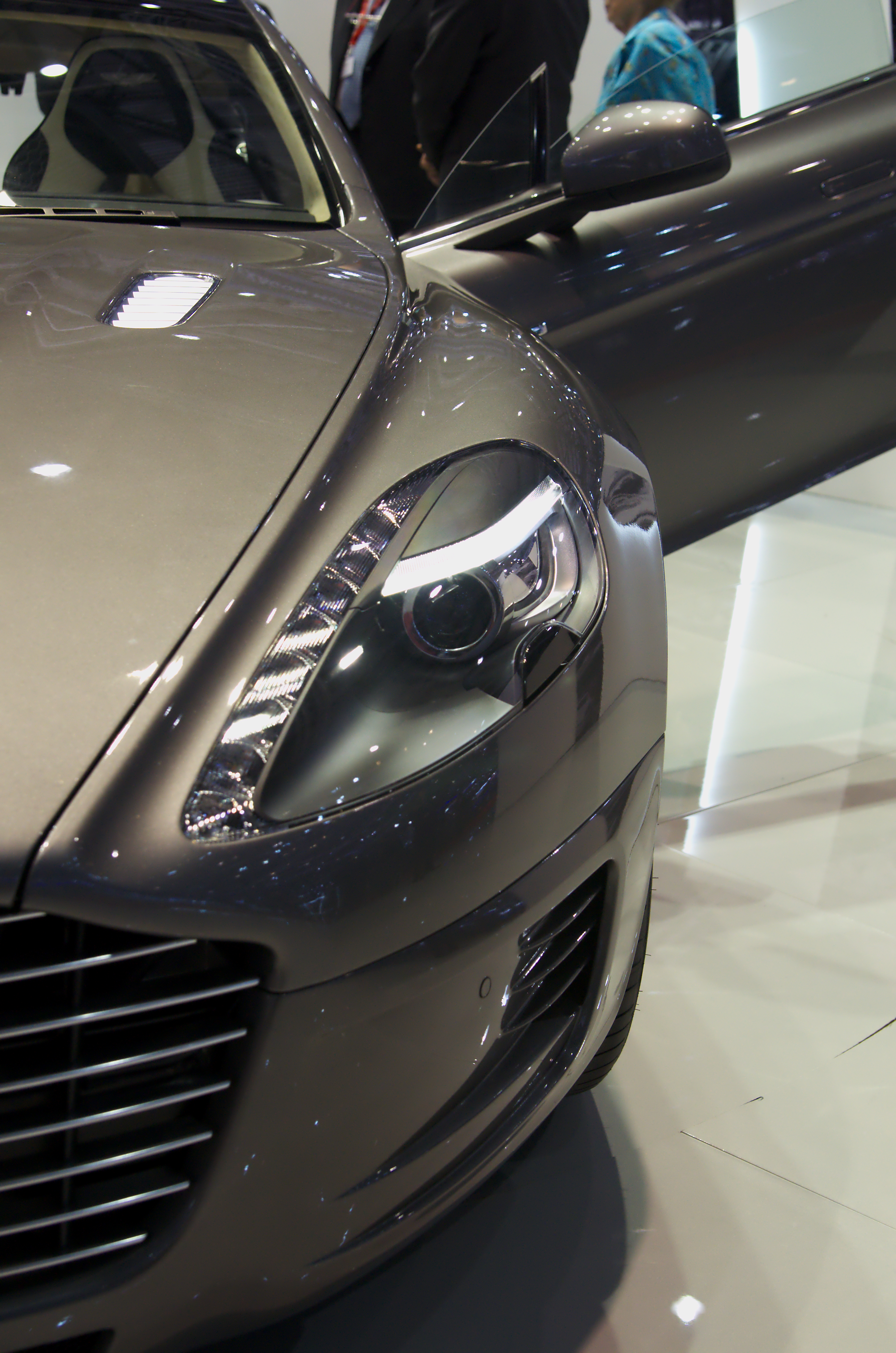
Headlight

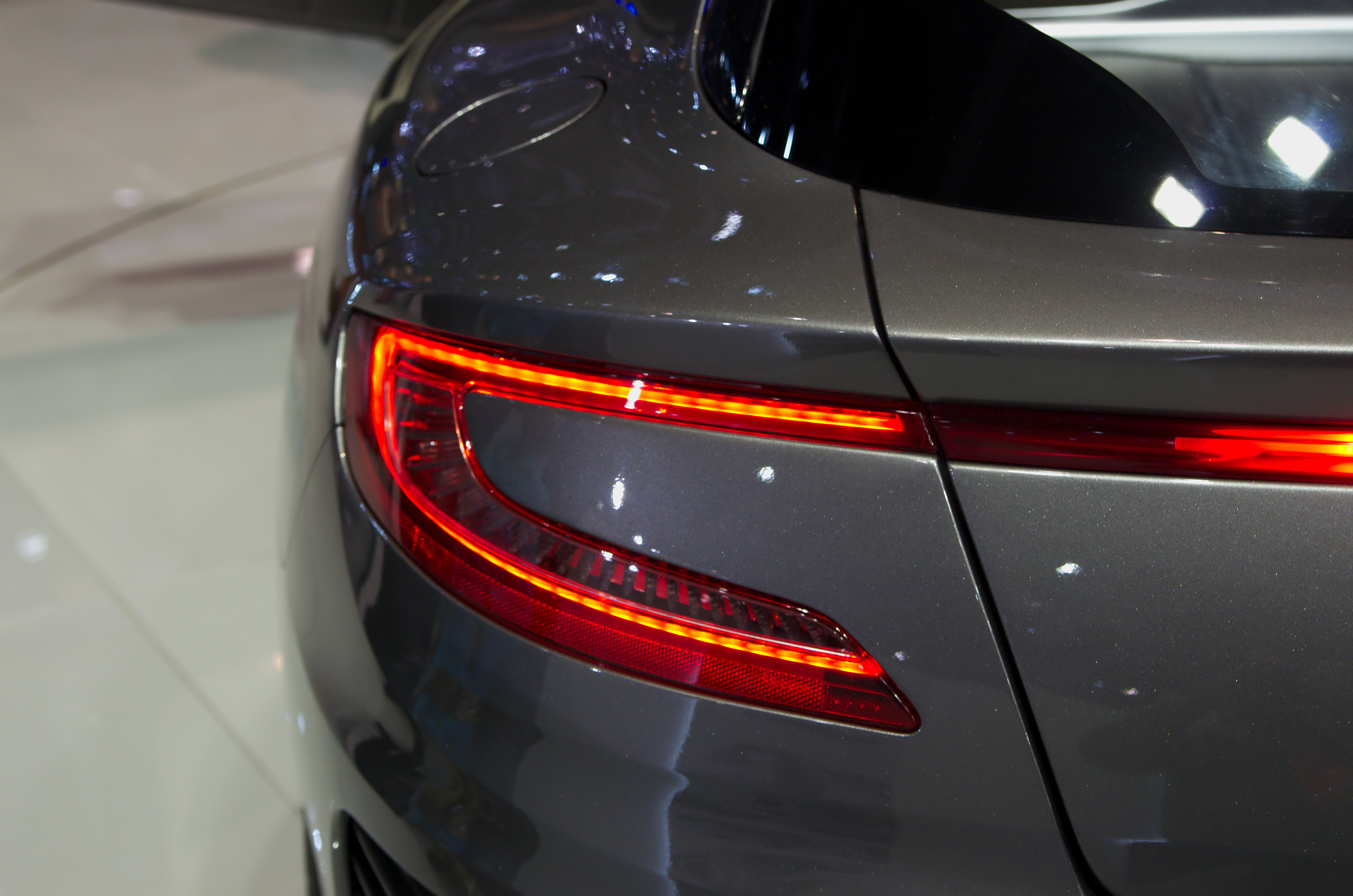
Taillight
