= Tube frame =

Tube frame may refer to:

- Tube (structure), a structure designed to act like a three-dimensional hollow tube so to resist lateral loads
- Space frame or space structure, a truss-like, lightweight rigid structure constructed from interlocking struts in a geometric pattern
- Superleggera, sometimes referred to as a tube-frame structure
