= Aston Martin DB4 =

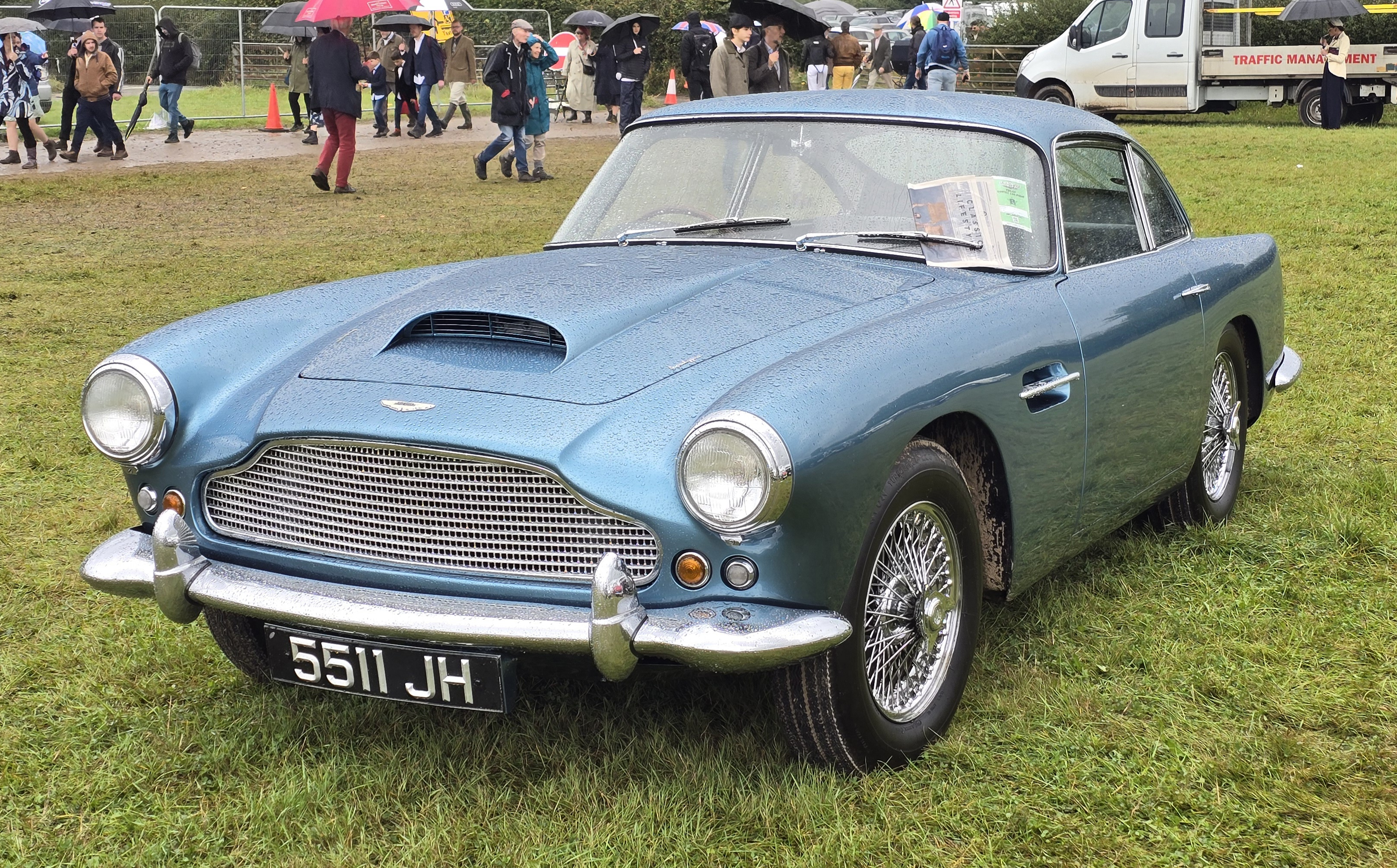
- 1960 Aston Martin DB4

Overview
- Manufacturer: Aston Martin
- Production: 1958–1963; 1,204 produced; DB4: 1,110 built; DB4 GT: 75 built; DB4 GT Zagato: 19 built
- Assembly: United Kingdom: Newport Pagnell, England
- Designer: Federico Formenti at Carrozzeria Touring

Body and chassis
- Class: Grand tourer
- Body style: 2+2 coupé; 2-seat coupé; 2+2 drophead
- Layout: FR layout
- Related: DB4 GT Zagato; Lagonda Rapide

Powertrain
- Engine: 4.0 L Marek DOHC I6, 240 bhp @ 5000 rpm 240 lbs-ft @ 4200 rpm

Dimensions
- Wheelbase: 98 in (2,489 mm)
- Length: 177 in (4,496 mm)
- Width: 66 in (1,676 mm)
- Height: 52.5 in (1,334 mm)
- Kerb weight: 1308 kg (2883 lb)

Chronology
- Predecessor: Aston Martin DB Mark III
- Successor: Aston Martin DB5

The Aston Martin DB4 is a grand tourer that was produced by Aston Martin from 1958 until 1963. The "DB" designation came from Sir David Brown, who built up the company from 1947 onwards.

Technically the DB4 was not a development of the DB Mark III it replaced, nor did it evolve into the DB5. It had a platform rather than a tubular chassis with a new engine by Tadek Marek. The DB4's design formed the basis for later Aston Martin models, such as the DB4 GT Zagato and the Lagonda Rapide 4-door saloon.

== Design ==
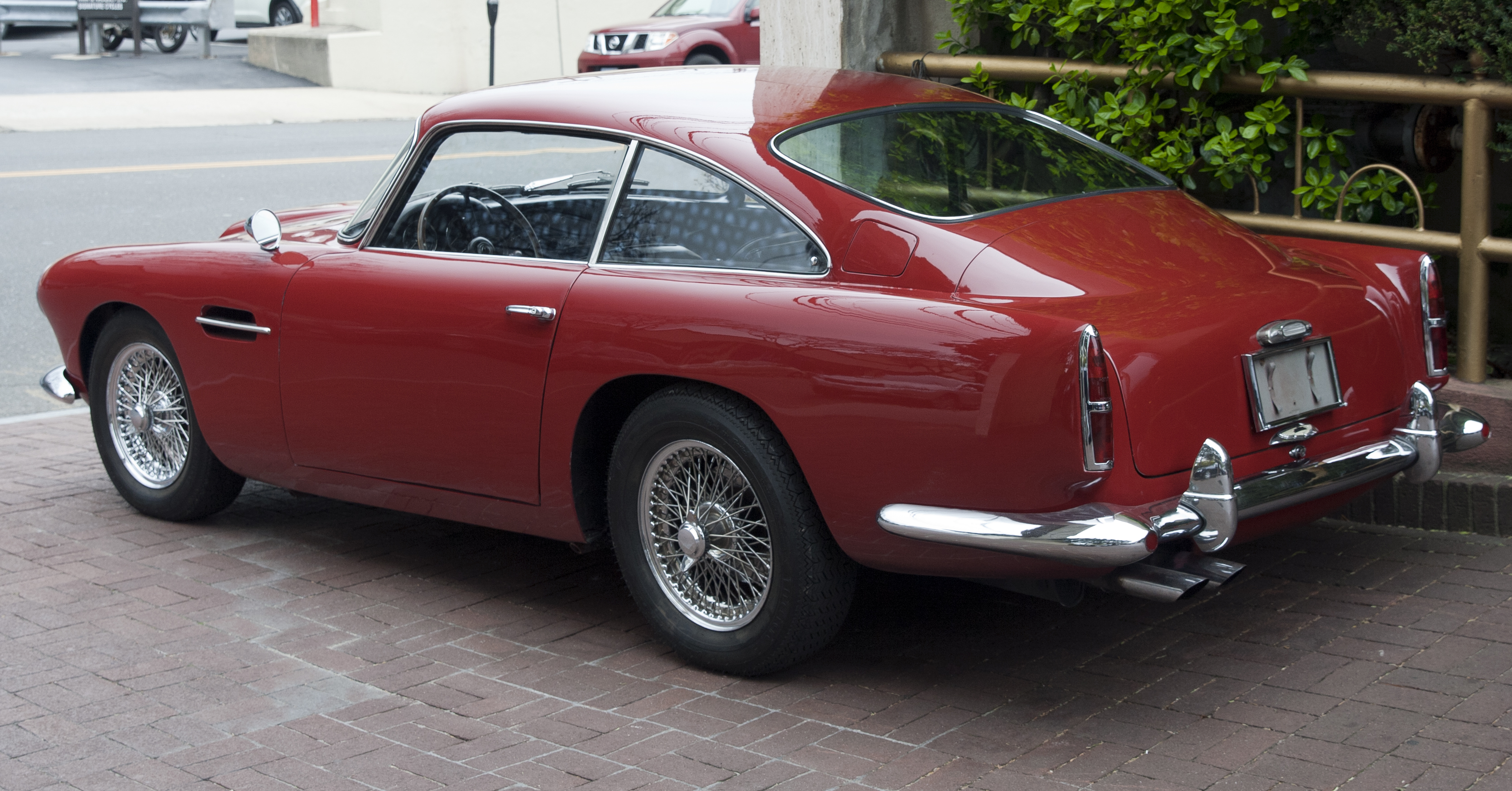
1960 Aston Martin DB4 Series I rear

The lightweight superleggera (tube-frame) body was designed by Carrozzeria Touring in Milan, and its Continental looks caused a sensation on its unveiling at the 1958 London Motor Show. Although the design and construction techniques were Italian, the DB4 was the first Aston to be built at the company's Newport Pagnell works in Buckinghamshire, England.

== Specifications ==
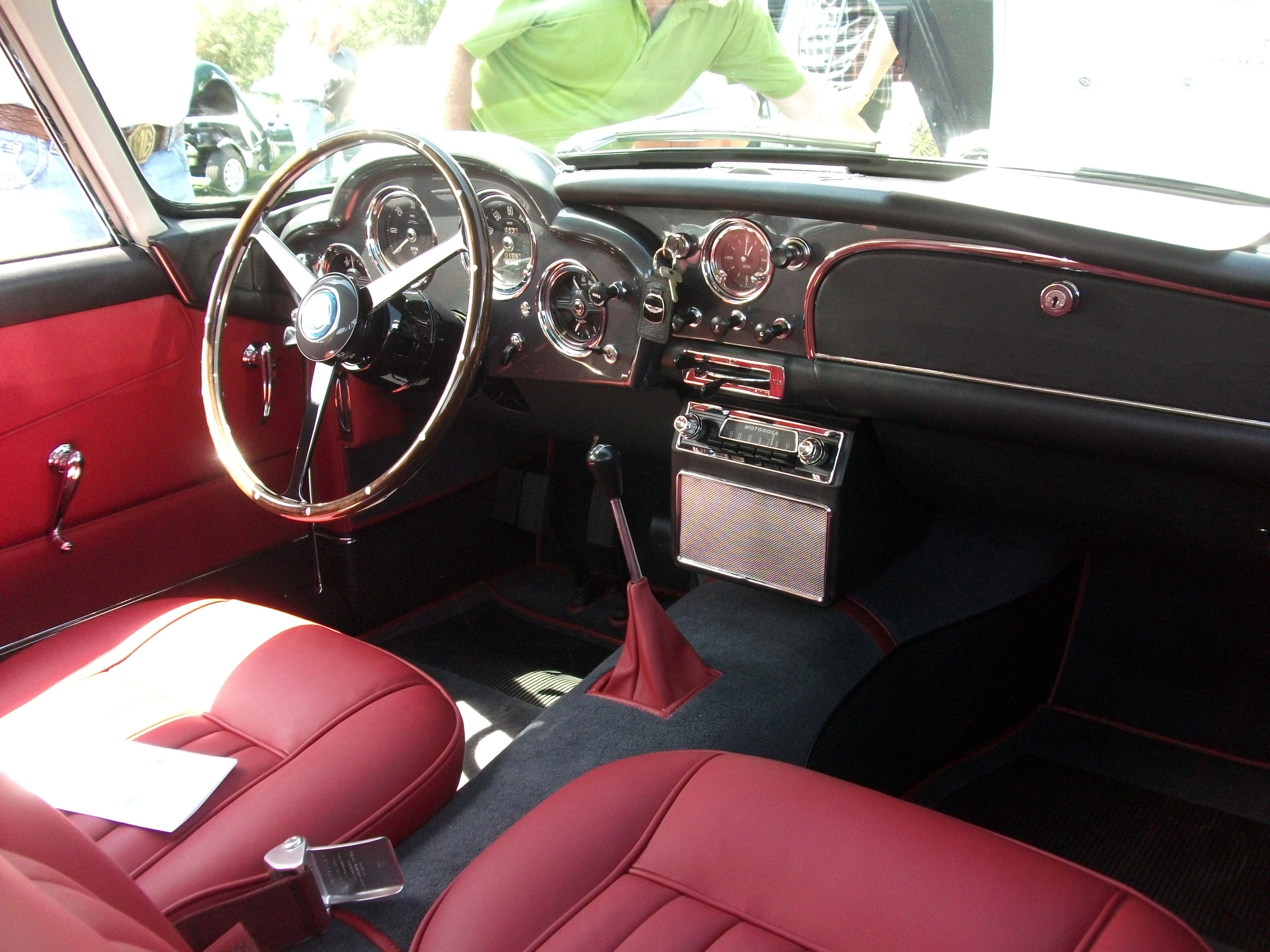
1961 Aston Martin DB4 interior

The 3.7 L (3,670 cc; 224.0 cu in) engine, designed by Tadek Marek, a Polish born racing driver, has double overhead cam straight-6, with cylinder head and block of cast R.R.50 aluminium alloy, a further development of the earlier Lagonda straight-6 engine. The engine was prone to overheating initially, but the 240 hp (179 kW) produced by the twin-SU carburettor version made buyers forgive this unfortunate trait. Servo-assisted disc brakes were fitted all round - early 11.5 in (292 mm) Dunlops were replaced by Girlings. The independent front suspension used ball-jointed wishbones, coil springs and rack-and-pinion steering. The live rear axle also used coil springs and was located by a Watt's linkage. The normal final-drive ratio for British and European use was 3.54:1, however in the United States the ratio was usually 3.77. Customers wanting a car with an especially high top speed could choose a 3.31:1 ratio.

== Performance ==
A car with the British standard 3.54 final drive ratio tested by The Motor magazine in 1960 had a top speed of 139.3 mph (224.2 km/h) and could accelerate from 0-60 mph (97 km/h) in 9.3 seconds. A fuel consumption of 17.7 miles per imperial gallon (16.0 L/100 km; 14.7 mpg_{‑US}) was recorded. The test car cost £3967 including taxes (equivalent to £79,000 in 2025).

== Models ==
=== "Series" DB4s ===
There were five "series" of DB4. The most visible changes were the addition of window frames in Series II and the adoption of a barred (rather than eggcrate) grille in Series IV. The Series III cars differed from the earlier ones in having taillights consisting of three small lamps mounted on a chrome backing plate. Earlier cars have single-piece units and the last Series V cars of September 1962 have similar taillights but recessed. The Series V also has a taller and longer body to provide more interior space, though the diameter of the wheels was reduced to keep the overall height the same. The front of the Series V usually was of the more aerodynamic style as already used on the Vantage and GT models, a style that was later carried over to the DB5 cars.

==== DB4 Convertible ====
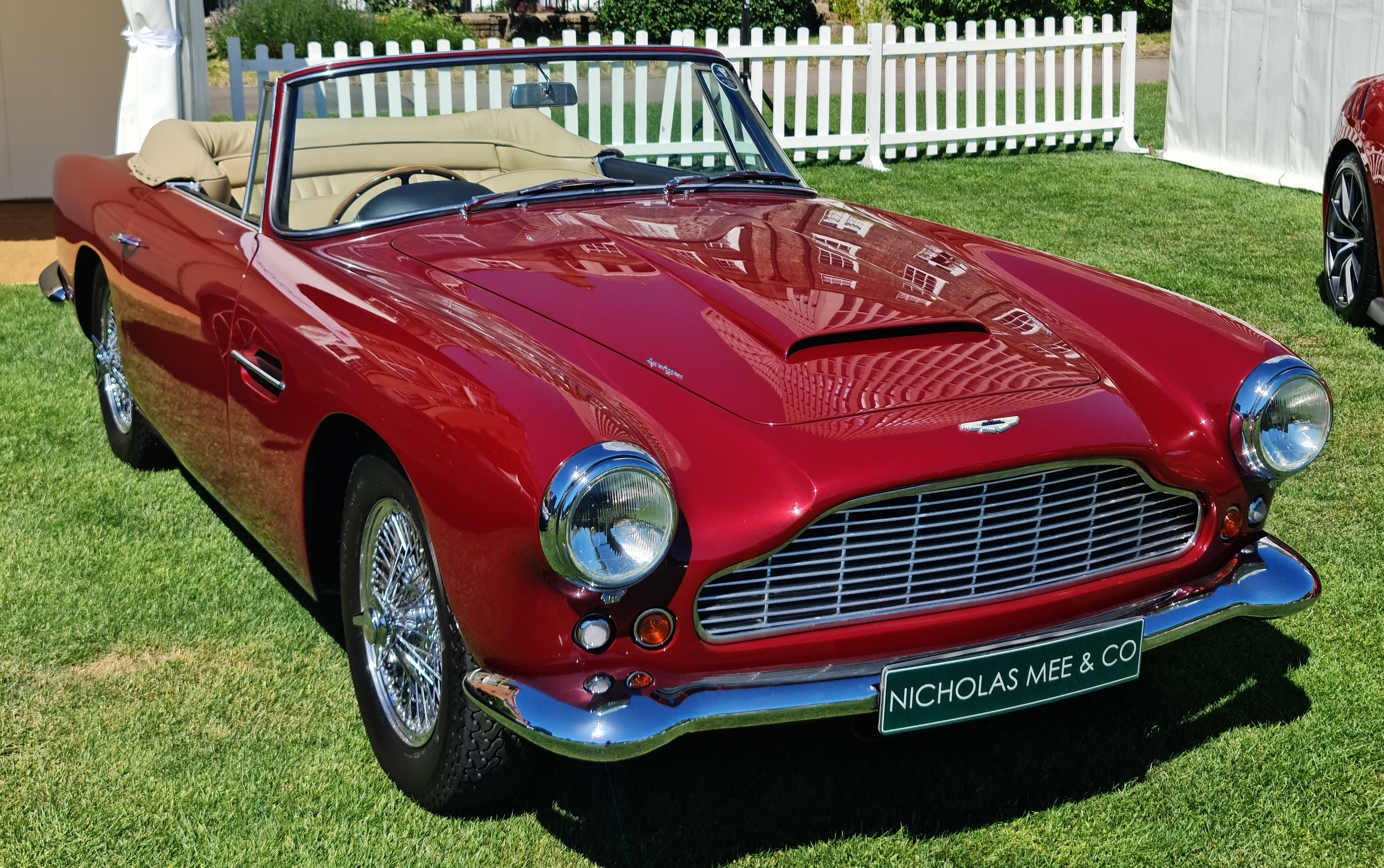
1962 Aston Martin DB4 Convertible

A convertible was introduced in October 1961. It featured in-house styling similar to the Touring saloon, and an extremely rare factory hardtop was also available. In total, 70 DB4 convertibles were made from a total DB4 production run of 1,110 cars. 30 of these were Series IV, with the remaining 40 belonging to the Series V. 32 of the total convertibles built (11 and 21 of the different series respectively) were equipped with the more powerful Vantage engine. Top speed for the regular version is about 136 mph.

=== DB4 GT ===
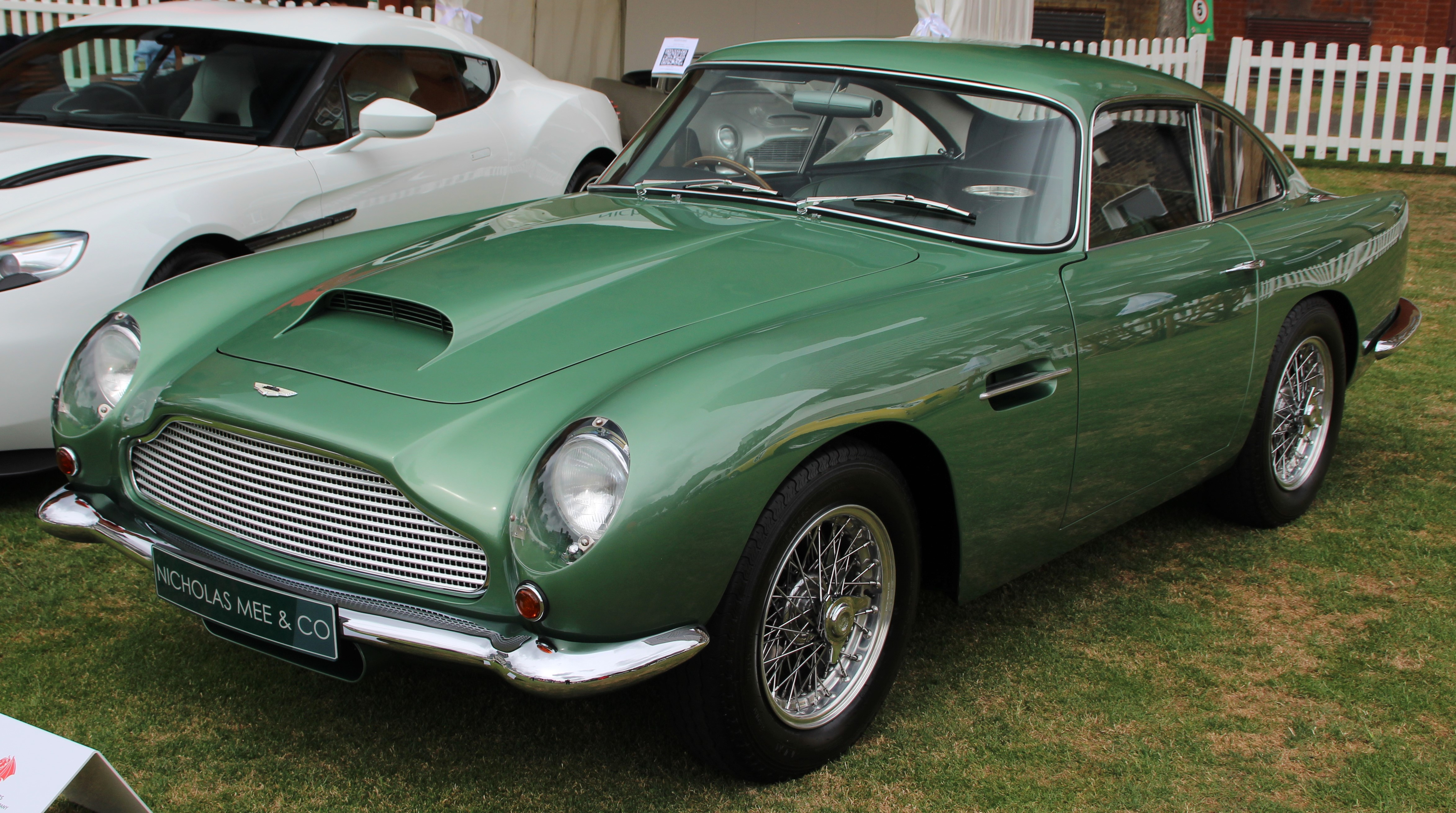
Aston Martin DB4 GT

The DB4 GT was a special lightweight, high-performance version of the DB4. Introduced in September 1959, it featured enclosed headlights and a thinner aluminium skin for lighter weight. The wheelbase was also reduced in comparison to the standard car, which resulted in many cars not being fitted with rear seats.

The engine was what made the GT special. Available in 3.7 L (3670 cc/223 in^{3}) and 3.8 L (3750 cc/228 in^{3}) versions, the engine had two sparkplugs per cylinder with two distributors and three twin-choke Weber carburettors. Modifications to the cylinder head brought compression to 9.0:1 and power output was 302 hp (225 kW). Maximum speed for the GT was 153 mph (246 km/h) with a 6.1 second acceleration to 60 mph (97 km/h). It was the fastest road legal production car at the time.

Seventy-five GTs were built with this body style. Nineteen more were modified by the Zagato works in Italy into DB4 GT Zagatos, with plain oval grilles, Borrani wire wheels and a smoothed out rear end without the stock GT's tail fins. A single car was styled by Bertone and dubbed the Bertone Jet.

==== DB4 GT Continuation ====
In 2016 Aston Martin Works announced that a further twenty-five track-only cars based on the 1959 lightweight specification would be manufactured at its Newport Pagnell plant, each costing around £1.5M with delivery expected in late 2017.

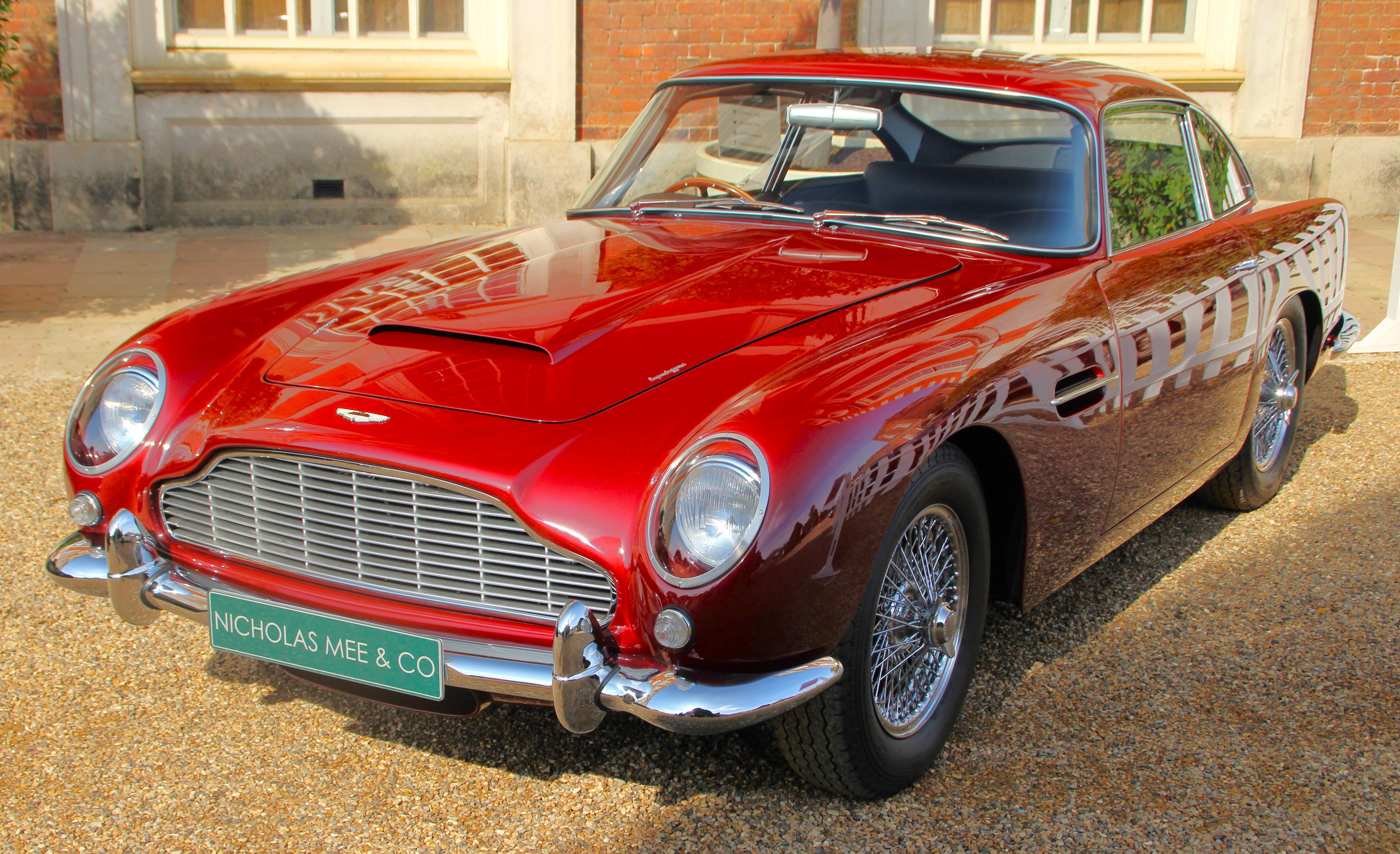
Aston Martin DB4 Vantage Series 4

=== Vantage ===
With the introduction of the Series IV in 1961, a high-performance DB4 Vantage was offered. It featured three SU carbs and special cylinder heads, increasing power to 266 hp (198 kW). Most Vantage models used the enclosed headlights of the DB4 GT. In all, there were 136 saloons and 32 convertibles with the Vantage engine.

=== Vantage GT ===
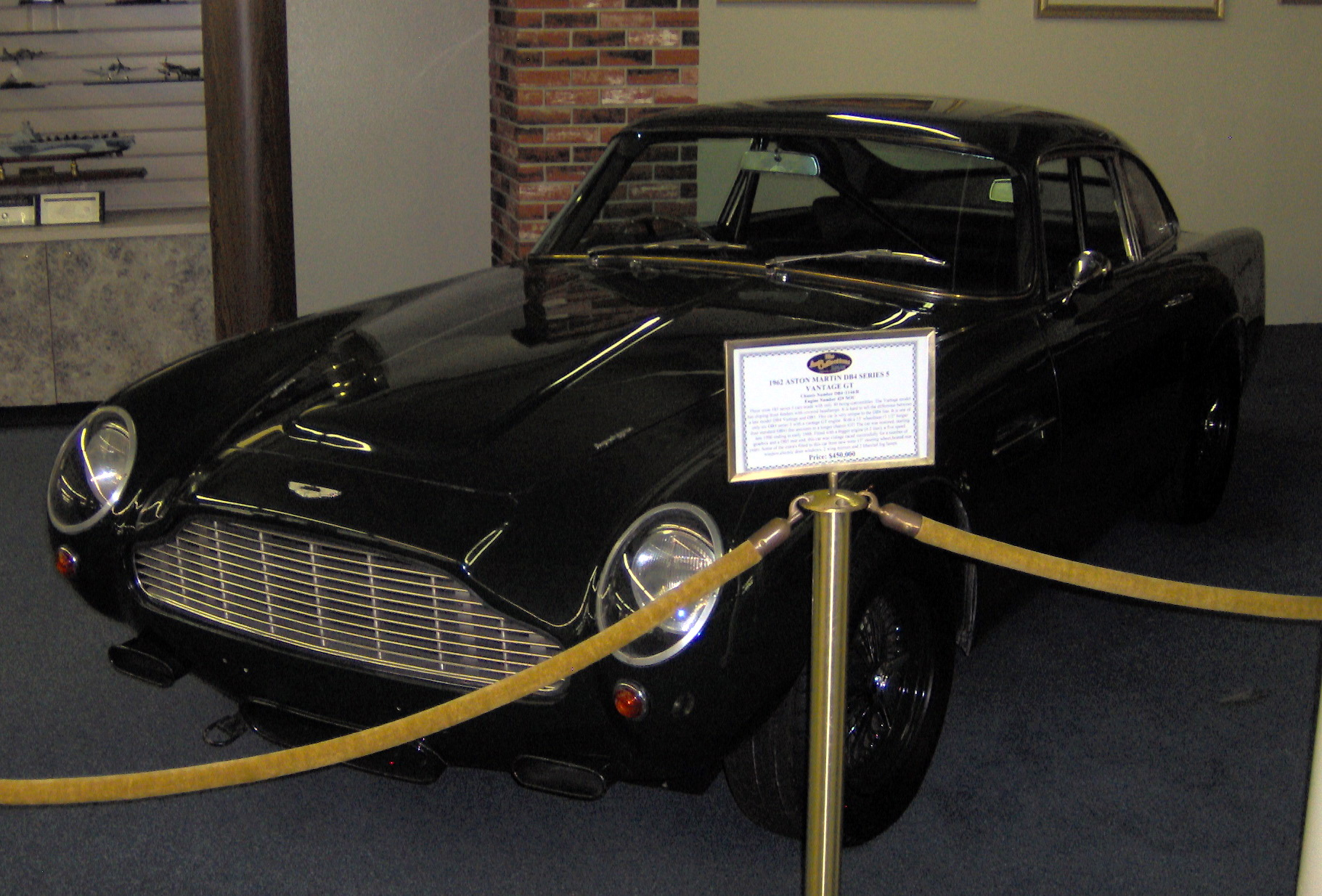
1962 Aston Martin DB4 Vantage GT Series 5

A tiny number of non-GT DB4s used the GT's more-powerful engine. This combination is often called a Vantage GT, though not all included the Vantage package and none was technically a GT. Three Series III, five Series IV, and six Series V cars have this unusual combination of body and engine for a total of 14.
