= Lagonda Rapide =

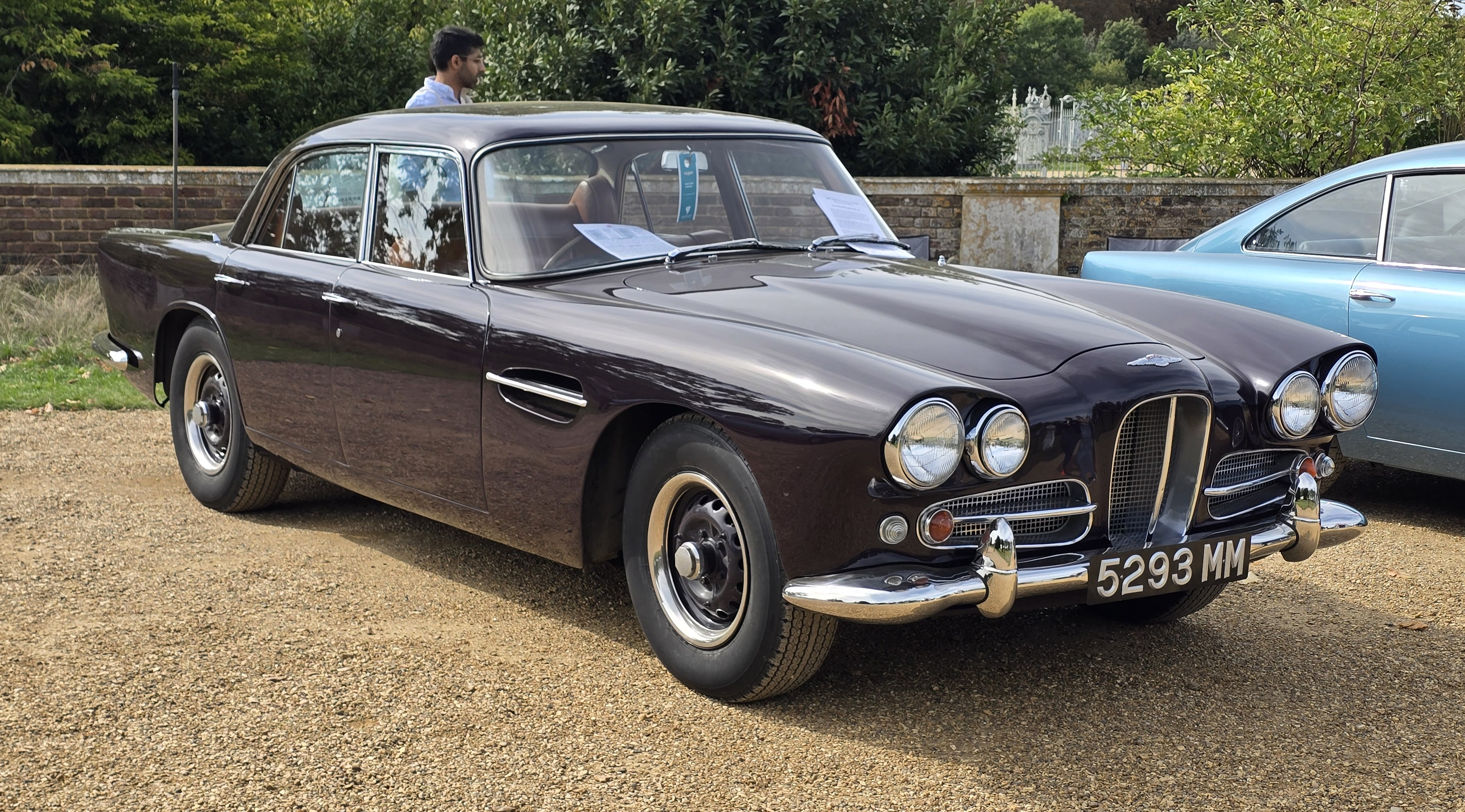

Overview
- Manufacturer: Aston Martin
- Production: 1961–1964; 55 produced
- Assembly: United Kingdom: Newport Pagnell, England
- Designer: Carrozzeria Touring

Body and chassis
- Class: Full-size luxury car (F)
- Body style: 4-door saloon
- Layout: FR layout
- Related: Aston Martin DB4

Powertrain
- Engine: 4.0 L DOHC I6

Dimensions
- Length: 196 in (4,978 mm)

Chronology
- Successor: Aston Martin Lagonda

The Lagonda Rapide is a hand built full-sized luxury four-door grand tourer which was produced by Aston Martin from 1961 until 1964 under its Lagonda marque.

== Description ==
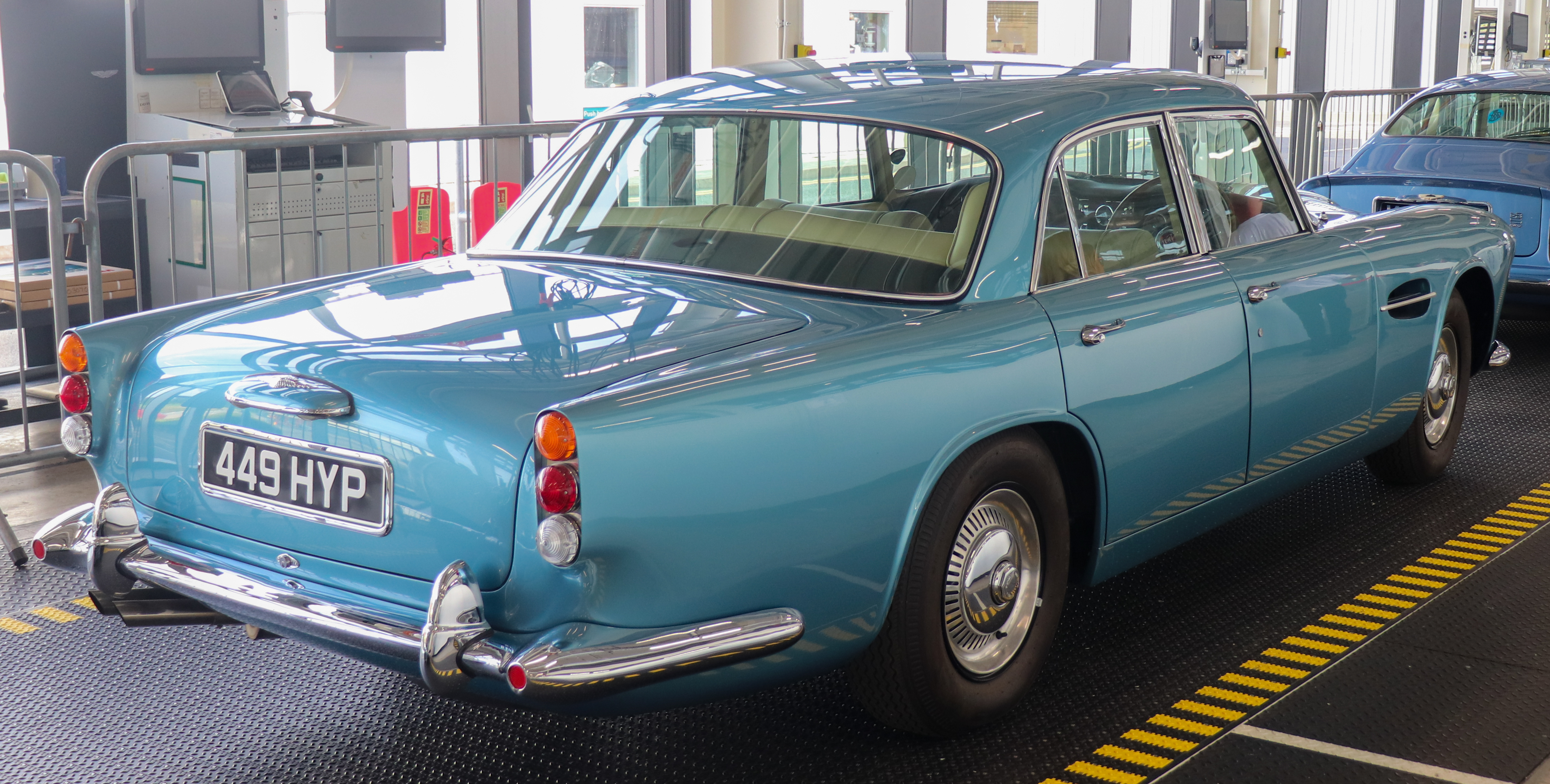
1961 Lagonda Rapide (rear view)

Based on the Aston Martin DB4, it was David Brown's attempt to revive the Lagonda marque which he had purchased in 1948 and not used since the 3.0 litre cars of the 1950s stopped production in 1958. It marked a revival of the Rapide model name which had been used by Lagonda during the 1930s. The car was styled by Carrozzeria Touring and featured rear-end styling similar to the DB4 convertible, and an adapted Lagonda grille a little similar to Ford's Edsel.

== Specifications ==
The Rapide uses a 4.0 L straight-6 six cylinder double overhead camshaft engine, which would later be used in the Aston Martin DB5. Other new features included a de Dion tube rear suspension which would find its way into the Aston Martin DBS.

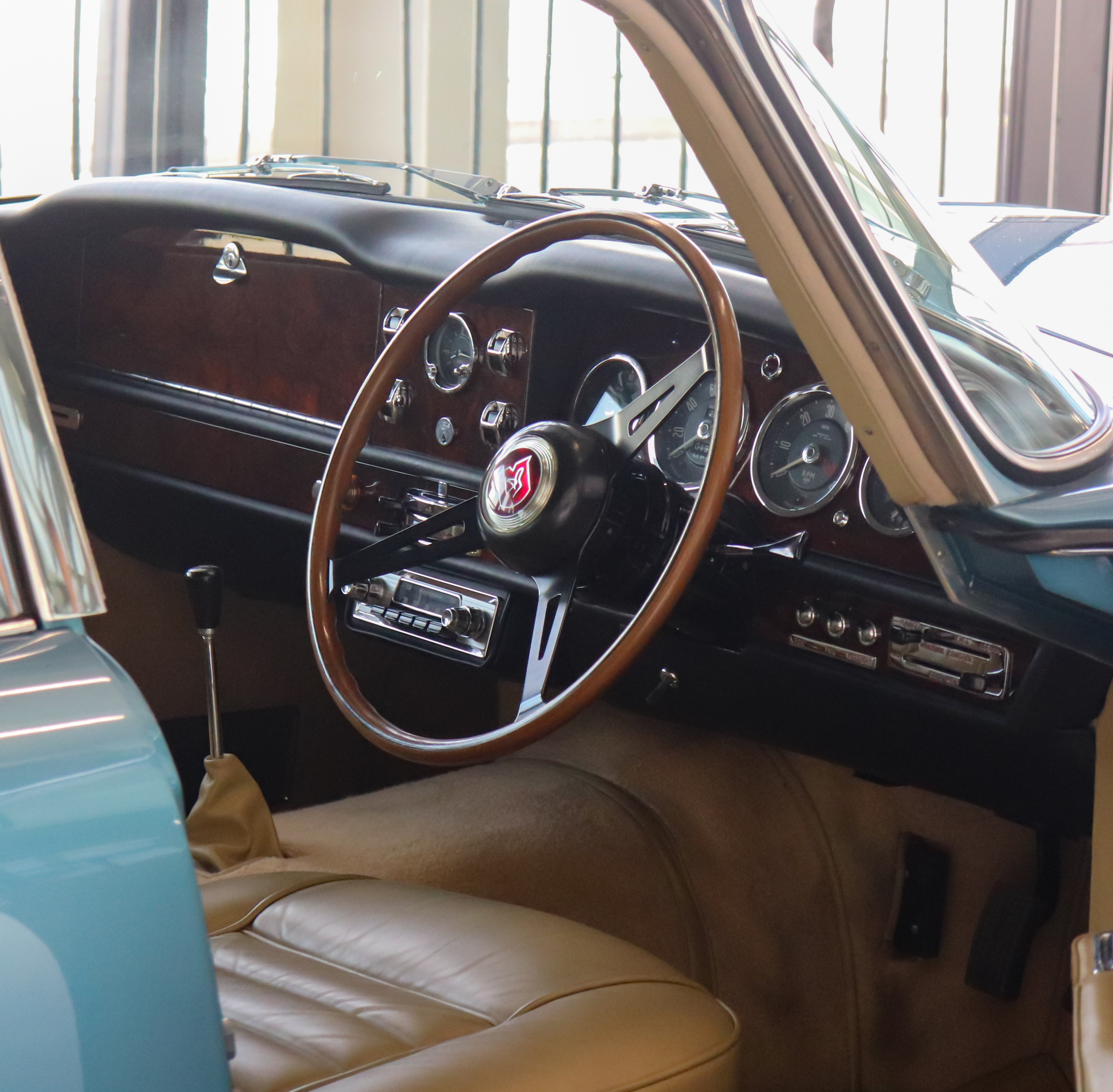
Interior

The car has dual-circuit, servo-assisted, four-wheel disc brakes, and most cars were supplied with a 3-speed automatic BorgWarner gearbox. The exterior body panels were constructed from aluminium alloy over a Superleggera tubular steel frame. All cars except for the prototype had their bodies constructed by Lagonda. The interior was upholstered in leather and had a burled walnut dashboard.

== Production ==
The car was hand-built to order only, with a base price of £4,950. 55 were produced, of which 48 survive.

== Shooting Brake ==
One Rapide was converted into a shooting brake in 2005–2006 by the Carrosserie Company Ltd. of Barnard Castle, England.

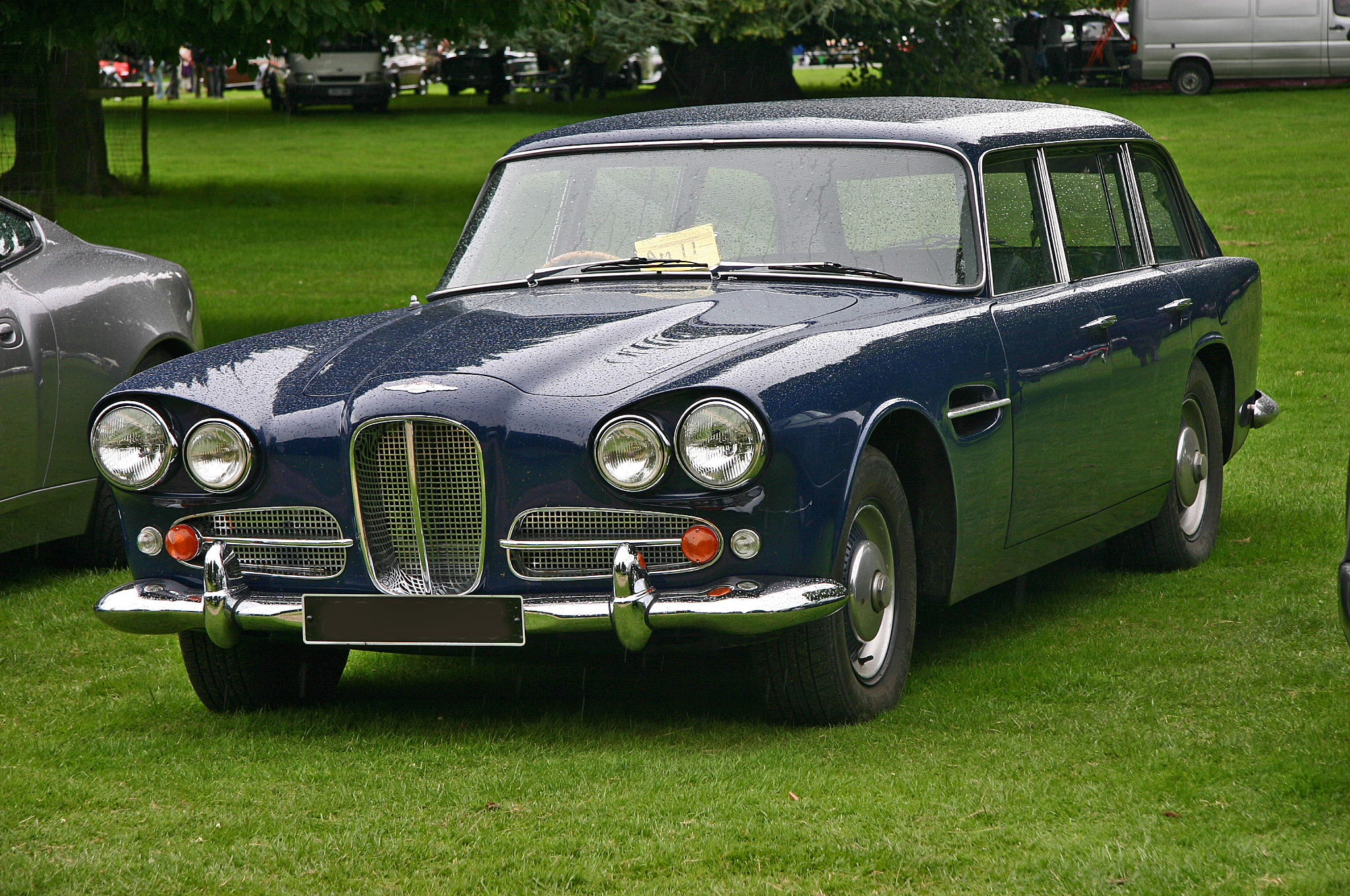
Lagonda Rapide shooting brake (front)

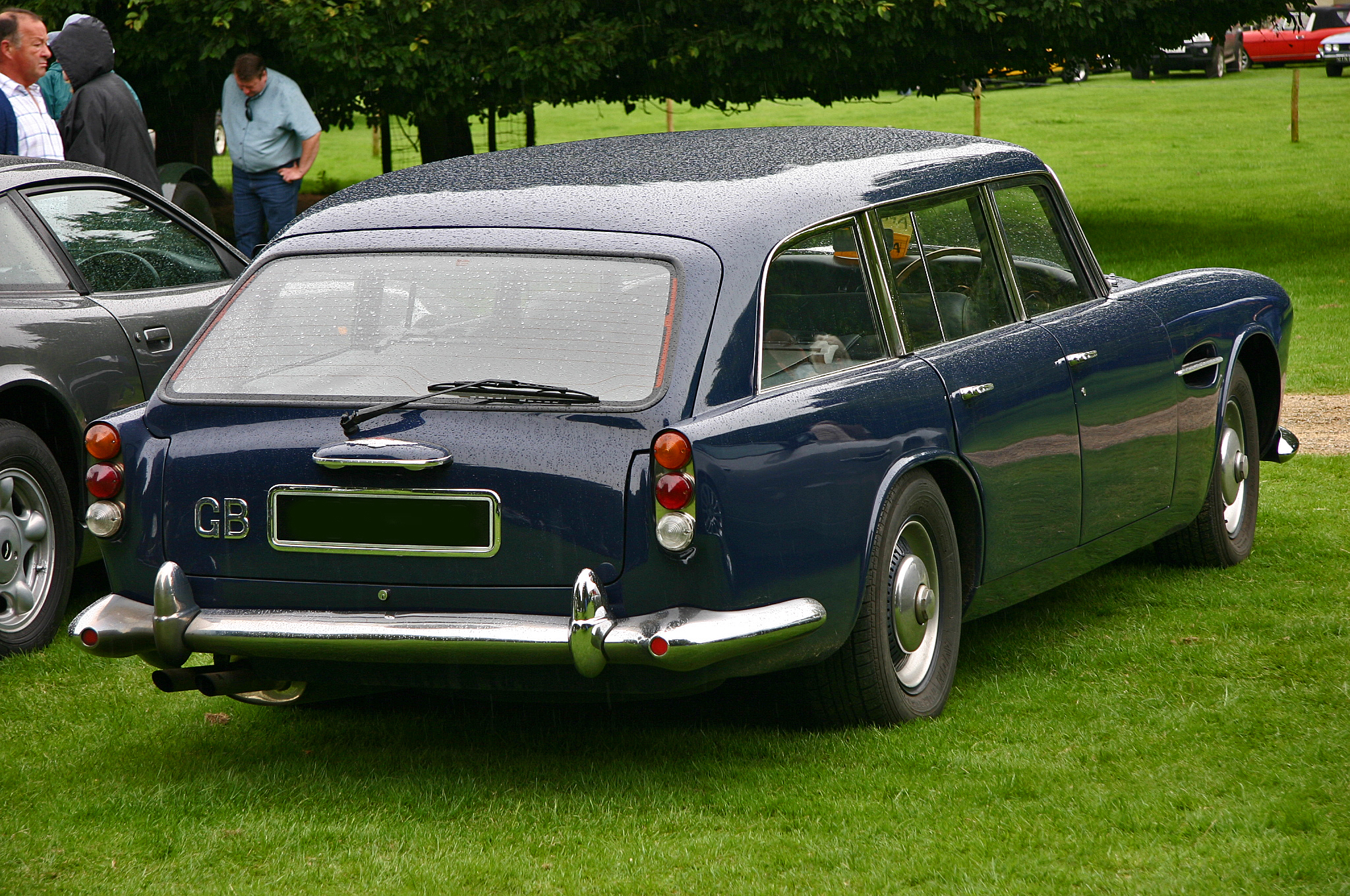
Lagonda Rapide shooting brake (rear)

== See also ==
- Aston Martin Rapide
