= Superleggera =

Automotive coachwork system

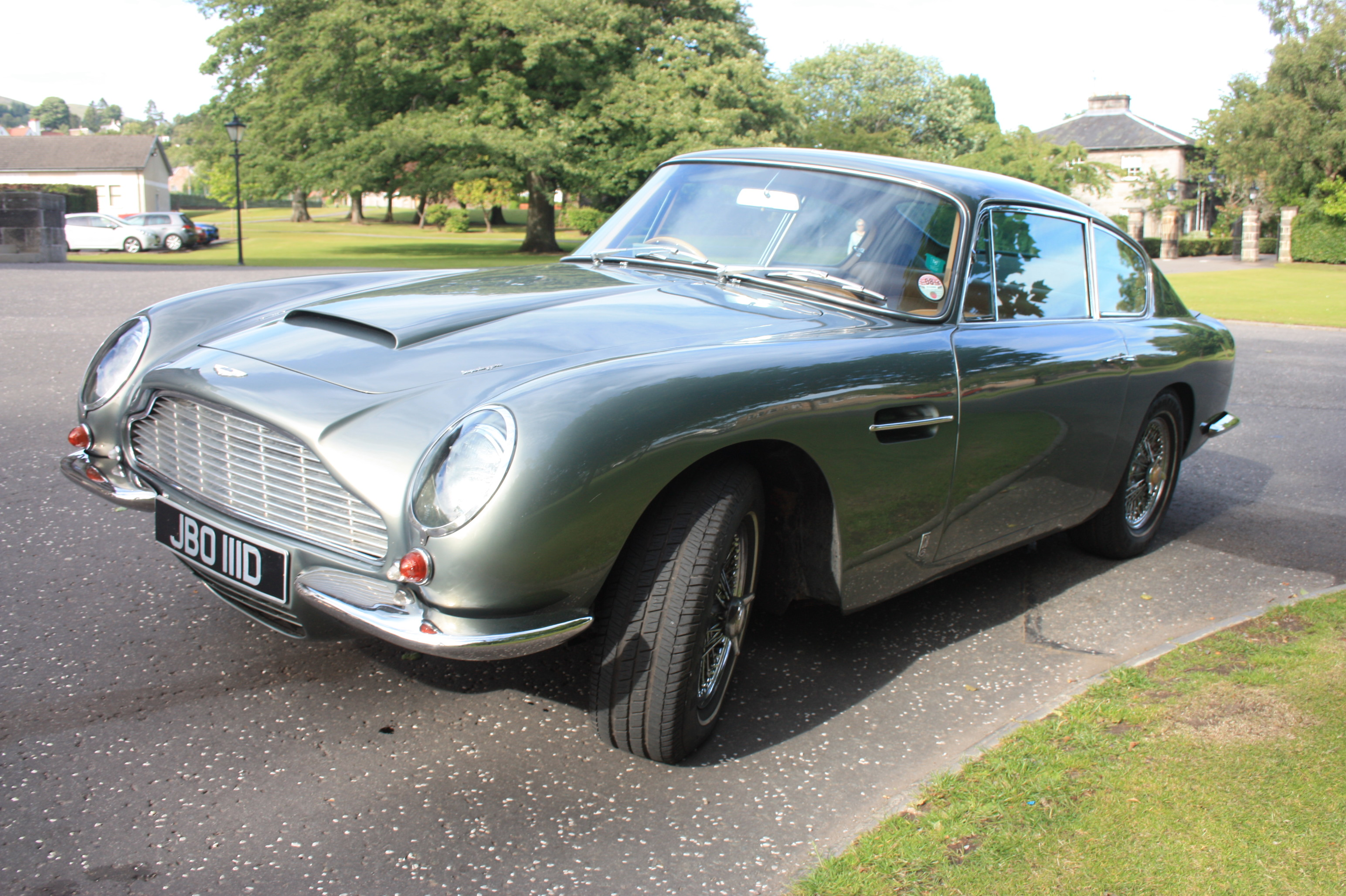
Aston Martin DB6 Superleggera

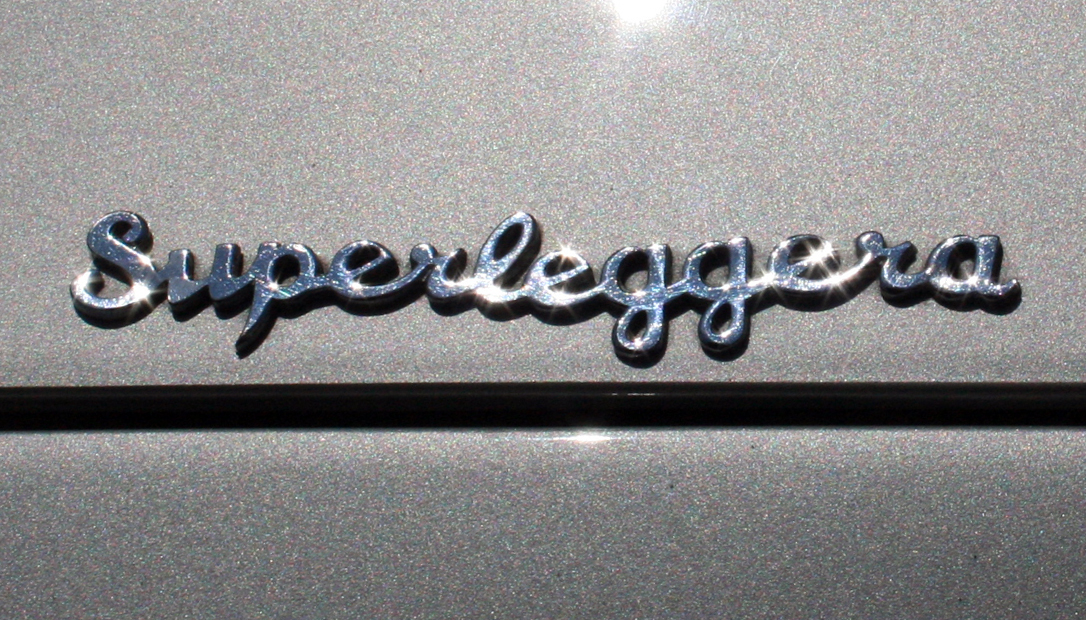
Superleggera emblem on an Aston Martin DB6, with a body manufactured by Carrozzeria Touring, the firm that originated the superleggera system.

Superleggera (Italian for Superlight) is a custom tube and alloy panel automobile coachwork construction technology developed by Felice Bianchi Anderloni of Italian coachbuilder Carrozzeria Touring Superleggera. A separate chassis was still required.

Touring licensed Charles Weymann’ssystem of fabric-covered lightweight frames, which led to Touring’s own superleggera construction. Patented by Carrozzeria Touring in 1936, the superleggera system consists of a structural framework of small-diameter steel tubes that conform to an automobile body's shape and are covered by thin alloy body panels that strengthen the framework. Aside from light weight, the superleggera construction system allows great design and manufacturing flexibility, enabling coachbuilders to quickly construct innovative body shapes. The superleggera tubes were brazed to shape on a jig and the panels were then fitted over them. The panels are only attached at their edges, mostly by swaging the panel edges over angle-section strips on the steel framework. Most of the panel has no rigid or metal-to-metal contact with the framework, it merely rests on it, with the tubes wrapped in hessian or with a rubber spacer.

The superleggera system was primarily based on the use of 'Duralumin', a material that originated in the Zeppelin industry prior to World War I. The company was located just north of Milan, near Alfa Romeo, Italian Citroën, and the former Isotta Fraschini plant. The first superleggera bodyworks were made for these companies. In England after World War II, the alloy Birmabright was used, as it was stiffer in thin sheets and more widely available.

The superleggera system is no longer used in specialty automobile production for a number of reasons. Primarily, a superleggera body cannot meet modern impact resistance standards, and the cost of manufacture and galvanic corrosion between the aluminum body panels and the steel tubular frame are also prohibitive factors. Additionally, the frame tubes used to construct a superleggera body are too small and of unsuitable material for mounting suspension components, so a chassis is required, a disadvantage not found in unibody and other chassis systems. Car makers such as Bristol, which had aircraft industry experience, were more successful in countering galvanic corrosion than other manufacturers. Bristol introduced Superleggera construction on the Bristol 401 of 1948.

Superleggera is a trademark owned by Carrozzeria Touring Superleggera s.r.l., the modern incarnation of the firm that patented the system in 1936.

== Notable automobiles ==
Carrozzeria Touring licensed the superleggera construction system to Aston Martin, which designed and manufactured superleggera bodywork for the DB4 and DB5. Several other manufacturers created automobiles using Carrozzeria Touring's superleggera construction technology. Notable examples include:

- Alfa Romeo 8C 2900 Mille Miglia
- Alfa Romeo 1900 Super Sprint
- Alfa Romeo 2600
- Aston Martin DB4, DB5 and Lagonda Rapide
- BMW 328 Touring Roadster
- Bristol Cars
- Ferraris 166, 195, 212 and 340 models
- Lamborghini 350 GT
- Lancia Flaminia GT, GTL and Convertibile
- Maserati 3500 GT
- Pegaso Z-102

== See also ==
- Backbone chassis
- Body-on-frame
- Monocoque
- Spaceframe
