= Aston Martin DB4 GT Jet =

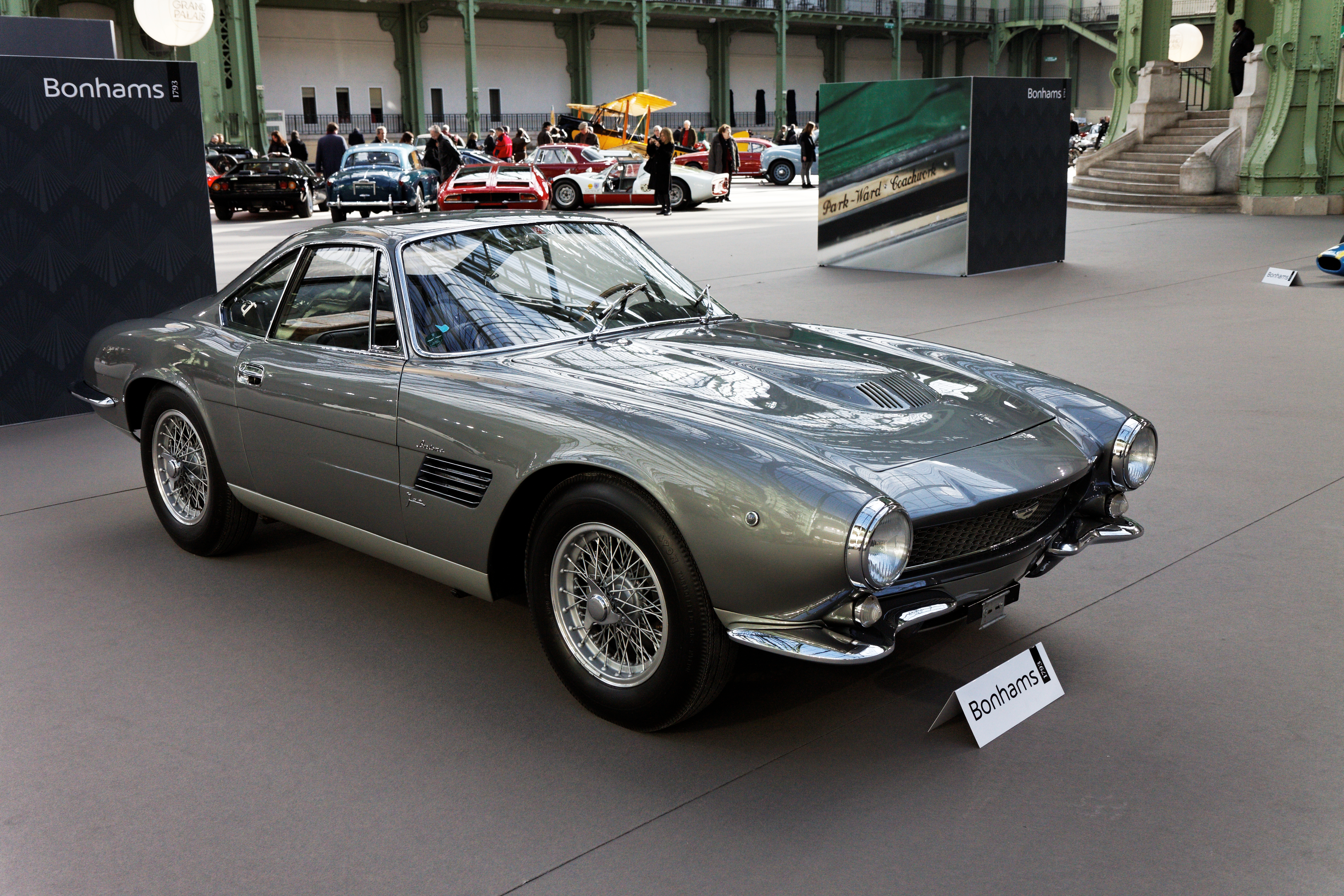

Overview
- Manufacturer: Aston Martin Lagonda Limited Gruppo Bertone
- Production: 1960
- Designer: Giorgetto Giugiaro at Bertone

Body and chassis
- Related: Aston Martin DB4 GT

The Aston Martin DB4 GT Jet is a special model of the Aston Martin DB4 GT.

The car was revealed at the 1961 Geneva Motor Show by Gruppo Bertone and was designed by Giorgetto Giugiaro who was only 22 years old at the time. It was based on the Aston Martin DB4 GT and was originally finished in light green and had a grey interior.

== Owners and restoration ==
According to its most recent auction listing, it was first in Beirut before being sent to the US. It's there that Victor Gauntlett, Aston Martin's Chairman found the car in bad shape and sent it back to the UK for a complete restoration by GTC Engineering under Kingsley Riding-Felce's supervision. The car had suffered an engine fire. The car was purchased by Hans-Peter Weidmann during its restoration which was completed in 1988. The car was offered for auction at Bonhams' "The Aston Martin Works Sale" in May 2013 and sold for £3,249,500 inc. premium. The car's chassis no. is 0201L and engine no. is 370/0201/GT.

== Gallery ==
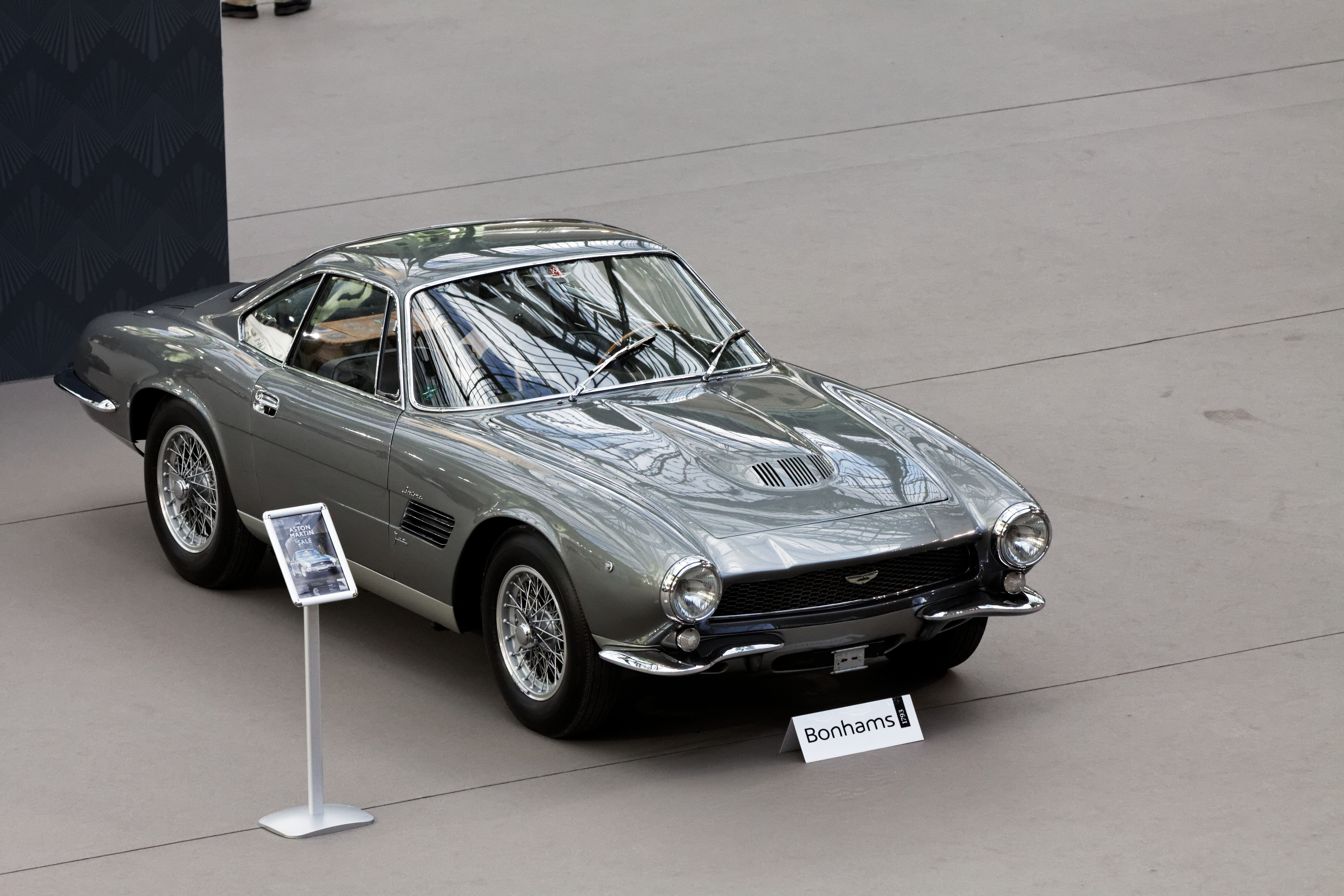

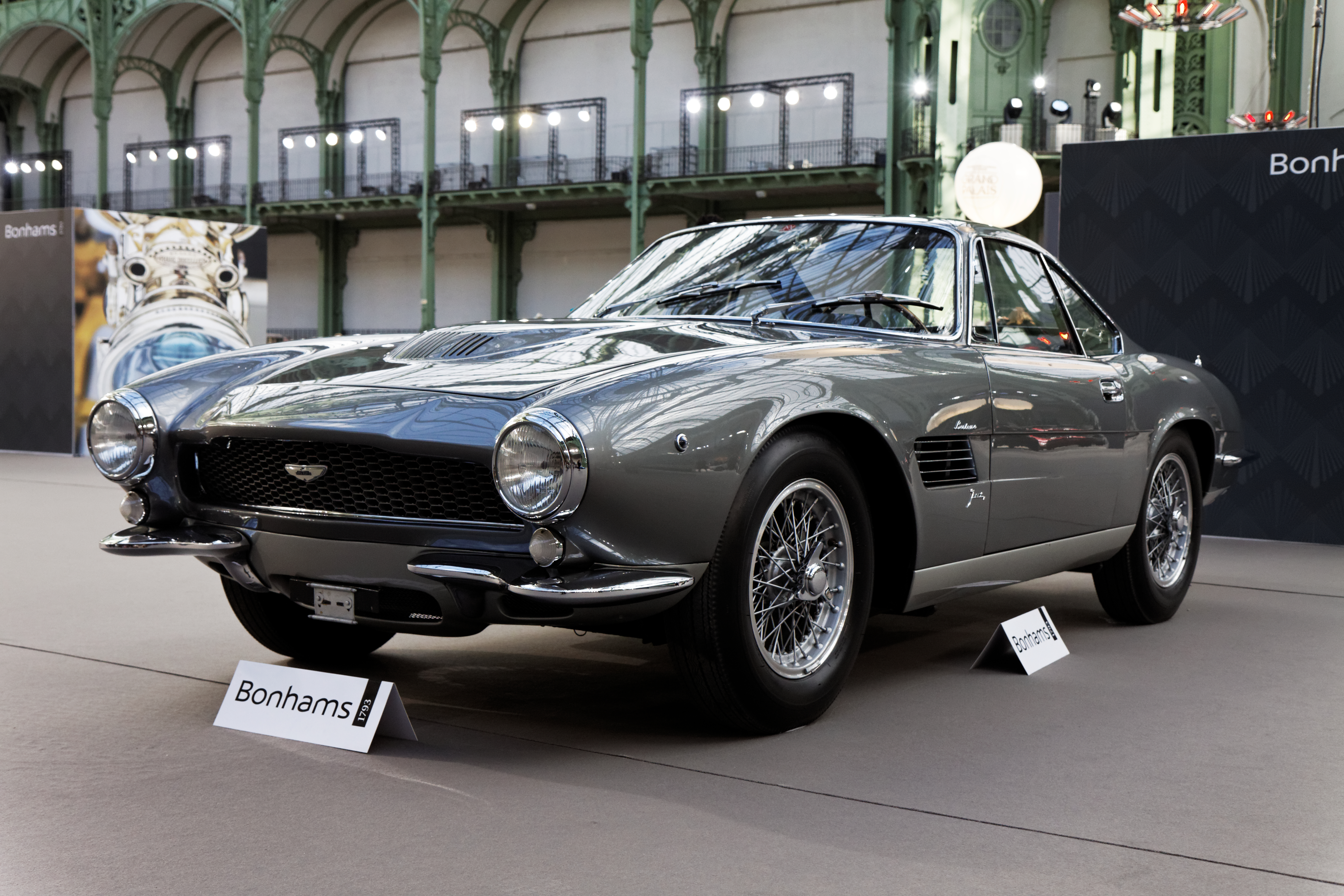

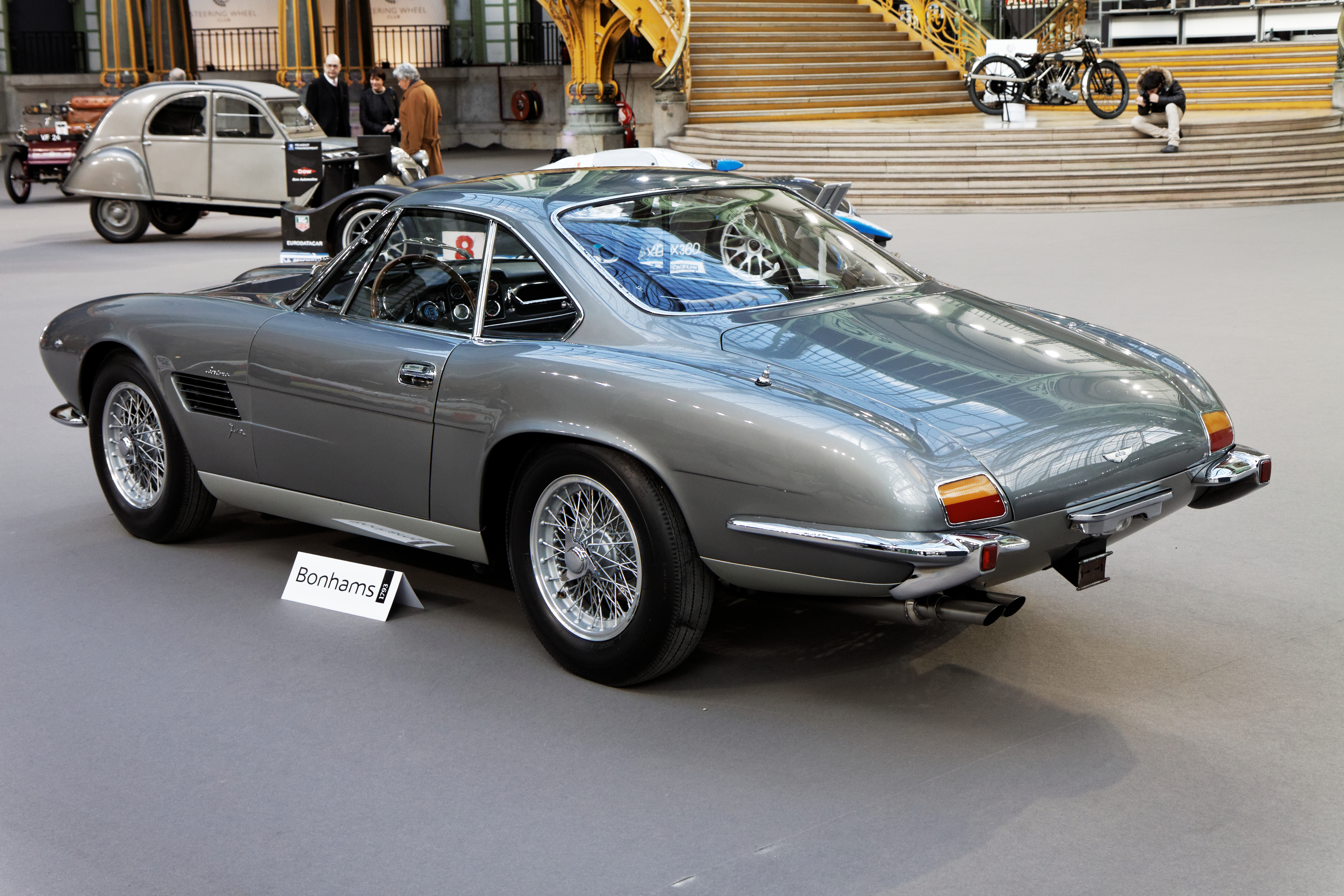

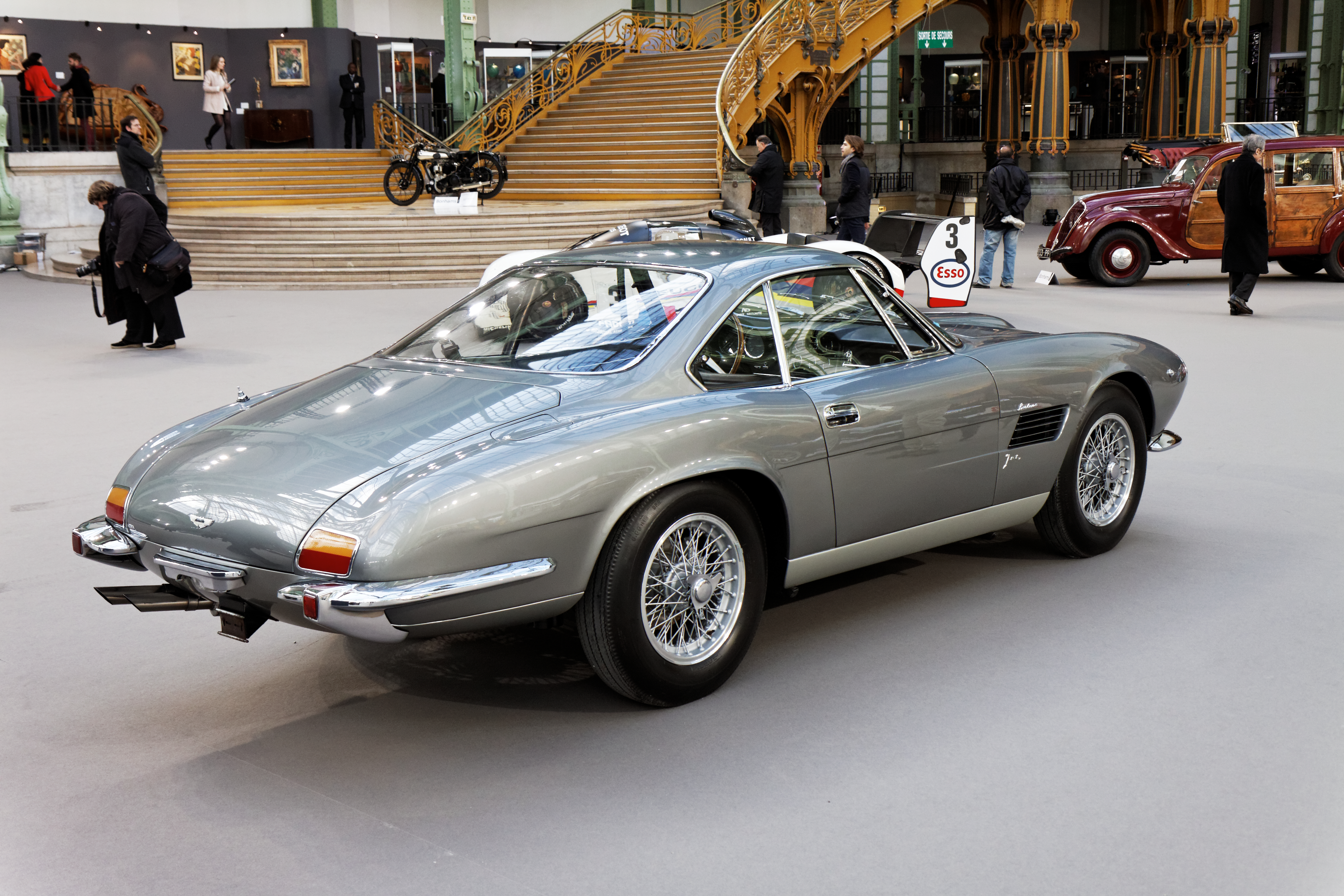
