= Harold Beach =

British engineer

- Born: 15 February 1913; Acton, London, England
- Died: 24 January 2010 (aged 96)
- Engineering career
- Discipline: Automotive Engineering
- Employer(s): Garner-Straussler Mechanisation; Aston Martin (Chief Designer)
- Significant design: Chassis and suspension for Aston Martin DB4, DB5, DB6

Harold Beach (15 February 1913 – 24 January 2010) was a British engineer for Aston Martin, and their Chief Designer. He designed chassis and suspension for the iconic 1963 Aston Martin DB5, and the 1958 DB4 and 1965 DB6.

== Early life ==
Beach was born in Acton in west London. He was educated privately and studied engineering at a technical college.

== Career ==
Beach began work for 30 shillings a week in 1928.

=== World War II ===
During the war he worked with the Hungarian-born Nicholas Straussler, working on military vehicles, including the innovative (and frequently lethal) floating tanks, which had a significant role in the Normandy landings (D-Day).

After the war he worked for Garner-Straussler Mechanisation in West London. Whilst there he saw a job advertisement for a design draughtsman with Aston Martin.

=== Aston Martin ===
The 1960s Aston Martin vehicles had the bodywork styled by Carrozzeria Touring Superleggera of Milan in Italy, and the engines developed by Tadek Marek (from Poland).

He started at Aston Martin on £11 a week in September 1950, working on a successor to the DB2, working with the Austrian Robert Eberan von Eberhorst. The DB4 was launched in 1958.

In the early 1970s, Aston Martin was in financial difficulties, and was sold in 1972.

== Personal life ==
Beach married Mabel. He died aged 96 in January 2010.

Business positions
Preceded by Robert Eberan von Eberhorst	Chief Designer of Aston Martin; 1956–1978	Succeeded by
