= Aston Martin Volante =

Volante is the name given to convertible versions of various Aston Martin automobile models from 1965 onwards. They include:

- Short Chassis Volante (1965–1966)
- Volante (DB6-based) (1966–1971)
- V8 Volante (1978–1989)
- V8 Vantage Volante (1978–1990)
- (Virage) V8 Volante (1992–1996)
- DB7 Volante (1996–2004)
- DB9 Volante (2004–2016)
- DBS Volante (2009–2012)
- Virage Volante (2011–2012)
- Vanquish Volante (2013–2018)
- DB11 Volante (2018–2023)
- DBS Superleggera Volante (2019–2023)
- DB12 Volante (2024–present)
- Vanquish Volante (2025–present)
