= Aston Martin Short Chassis Volante =

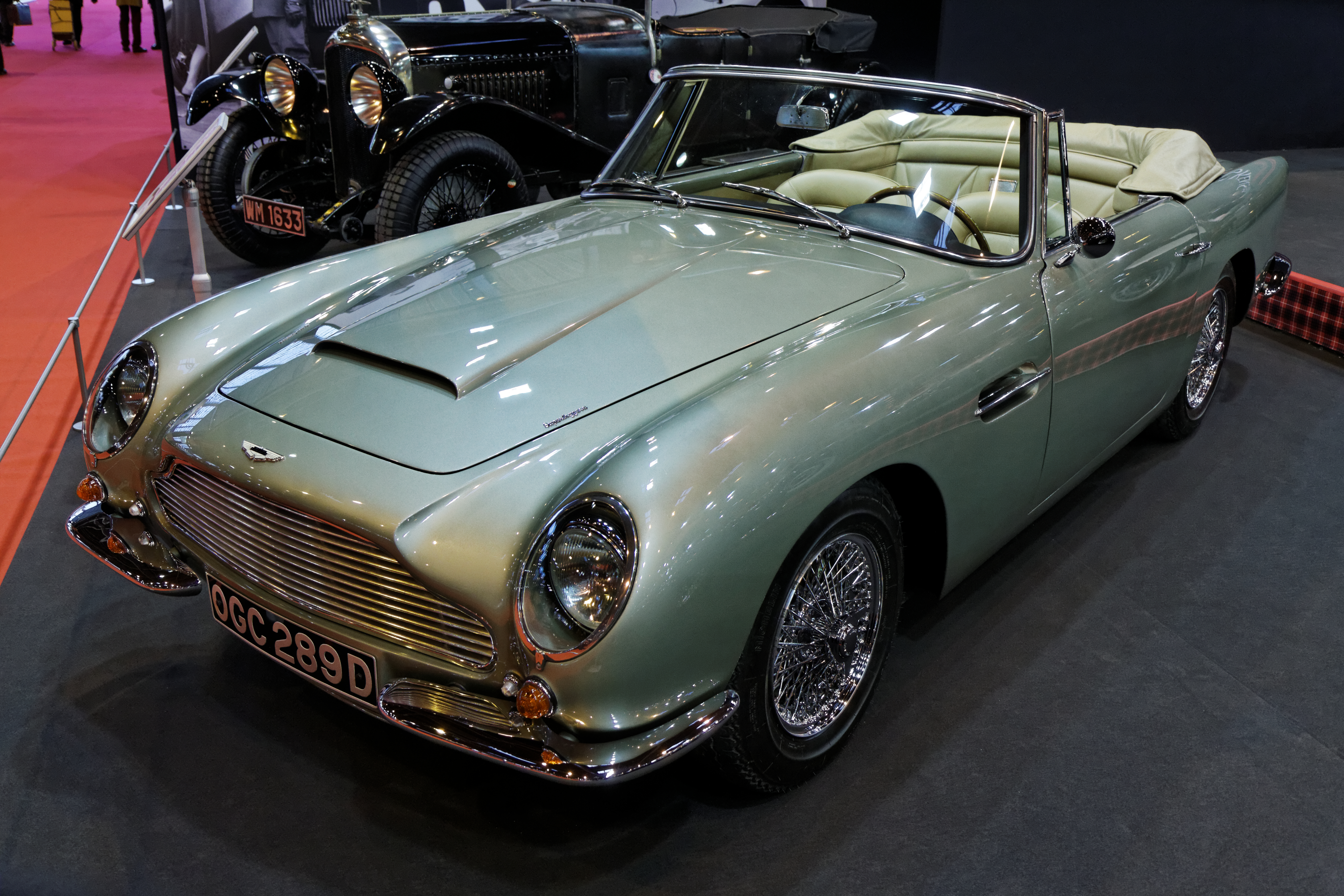
- 1966 Aston Martin "Short Chassis" Volante

Overview
- Manufacturer: Aston Martin
- Production: 1965–1966; 37 produced
- Assembly: United Kingdom: Newport Pagnell, England

Body and chassis
- Class: Grand tourer
- Body style: 2-door roadster
- Layout: Front-engine, rear-wheel-drive

Powertrain
- Engine: 4.0 L (3,995 cc) Marek DOHC I6
- Transmission: 5-speed ZF manual; 3-speed BorgWarner automatic (optional)

Chronology
- Predecessor: Aston Martin DB5
- Successor: Aston Martin DB6

The Aston Martin Short Chassis Volante (also known as the Short Wheel Base (SWB) Volante) was the first Aston Martin to be called an Aston Martin Volante ('Volante' means 'Flying' in Italian). As it was the first Aston Martin to be called a 'Volante' any 'drop-head' version of the DB4 and DB5 series should therefore be called a 'Convertible' and not a 'Volante'.

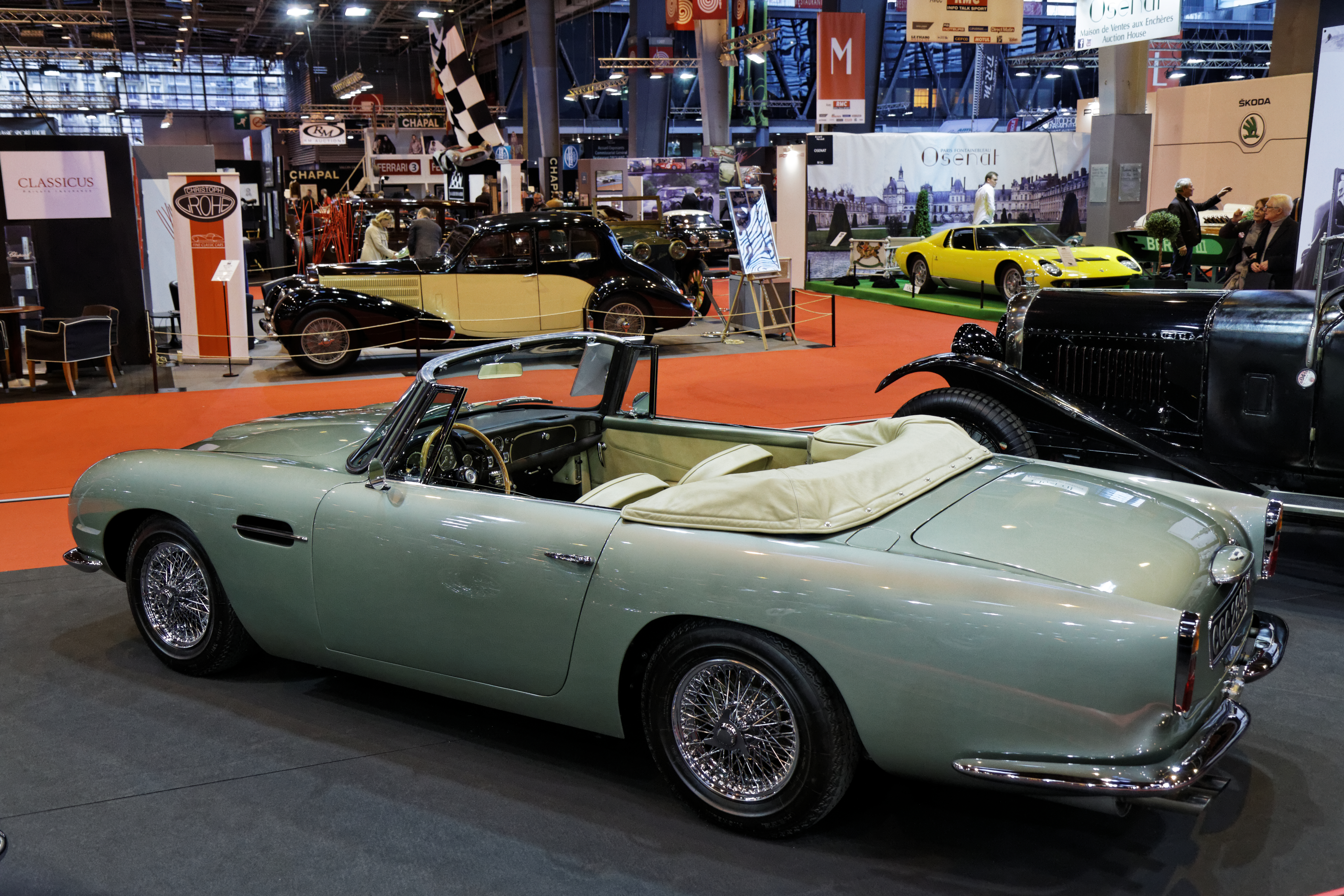
Rear view

The car is a cross between the DB5 (same chassis) and DB6 (bumpers, rear church/TR4 lights, oil cooler, leather stitching), but is closer to a DB5. 37 cars were ever built, constructed on the last DB5 chassis', between October 1965 and October 1966. Calling it a "Short Chassis" is a bit of a misnomer; it is a unique Aston model. The "short" comes from comparing it to the subsequent DB6, which had a longer chassis. When compared to the DB5, it is not "short" but rather the same size.
