= Aston Martin DB5 =

Grand tourer produced by Aston Martin (1963–1965)

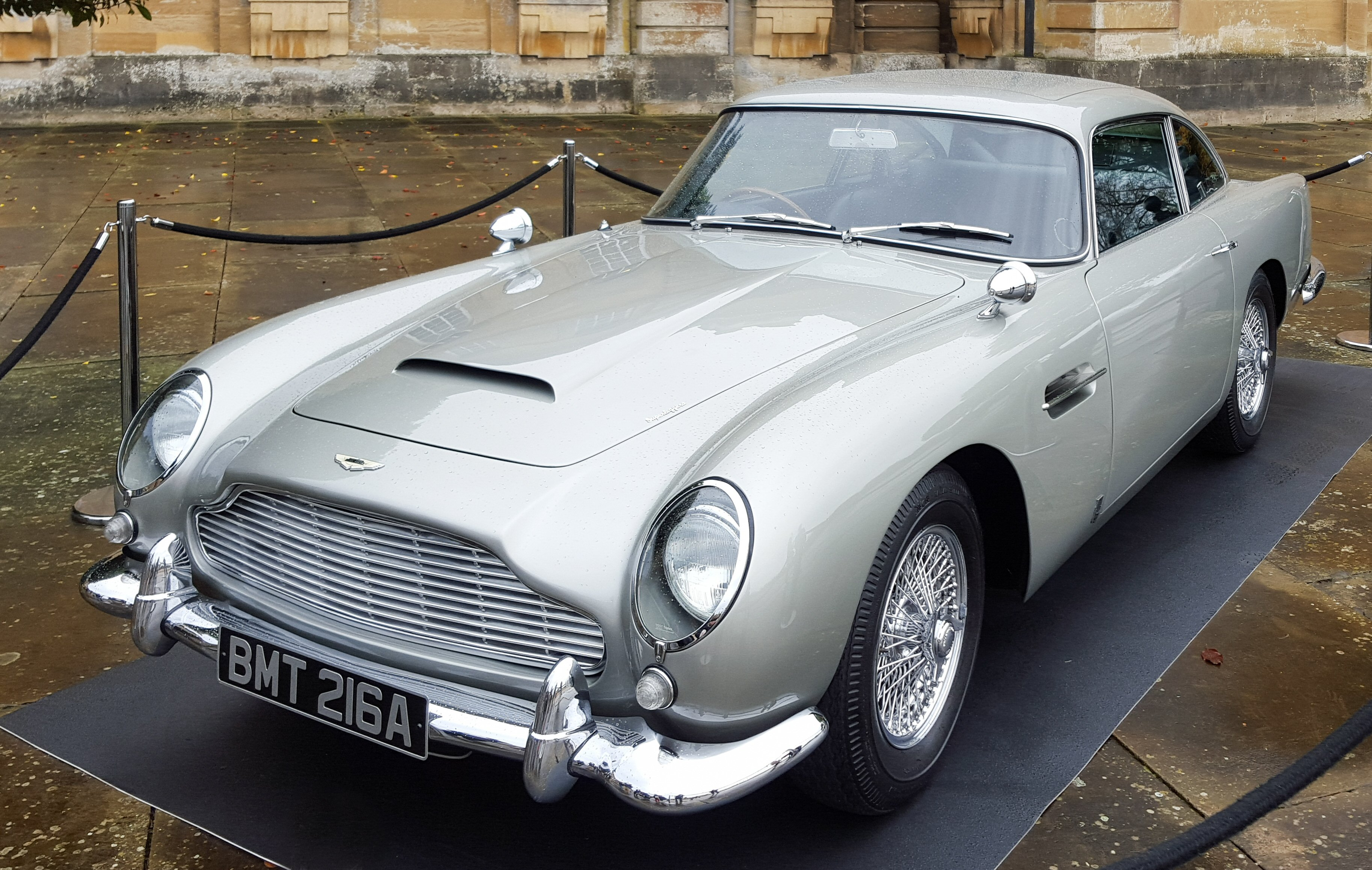

Overview
- Manufacturer: Aston Martin
- Production: 1963–1965 (1,059 units); 2020 (25 units)
- Assembly: United Kingdom: Newport Pagnell, England
- Designer: Federico Formenti at Carrozzeria Touring Superleggera

Body and chassis
- Class: Grand tourer
- Body style: 2-door 2+2 coupé 2-door convertible (123); 2-door shooting brake (13)
- Layout: Front-engine, rear-wheel-drive

Powertrain
- Engine: 4.0 L (3,995 cc) Marek DOHC I6
- Power output: 282–325 bhp (210–242 kW) @ 5500 rpm; 280–288 lb⋅ft (380–390 N⋅m) @ 4500 rpm
- Transmission: 5-speed ZF manual; 3-speed BorgWarner automatic (optional)

Dimensions
- Wheelbase: 2,489 mm (98.0 in)
- Length: 4,570 mm (179.9 in)
- Width: 1,680 mm (66.1 in)
- Kerb weight: 1,502 kg (3,311 lb)

Chronology
- Predecessor: Aston Martin DB4
- Successor: Aston Martin DB6

The Aston Martin DB5 is a British grand tourer (GT) produced by Aston Martin and designed by Italian coachbuilder Carrozzeria Touring Superleggera. Originally produced from 1963 to 1965, the DB5 was an evolution of the final series of DB4. The "DB" designation is from the initials of David Brown, who built up the company from 1947 onwards.

The DB5 is best known for its role in the James Bond films. It was first driven by the fictional spy in the film Goldfinger (1964). In 2013, the car featured on a "British Auto Legends" postage stamp issued by the Royal Mail.

== Design ==
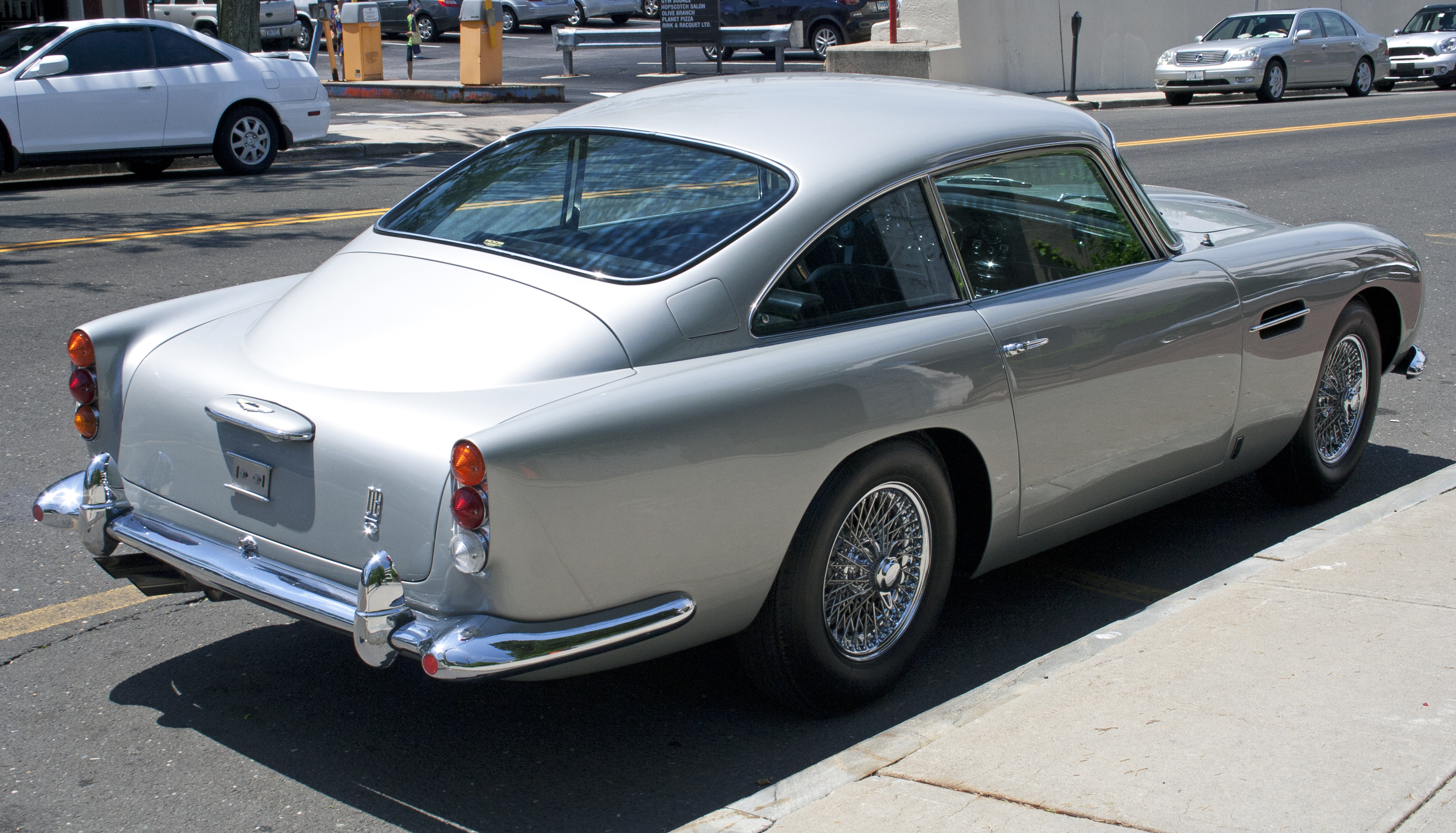
Aston Martin DB5.

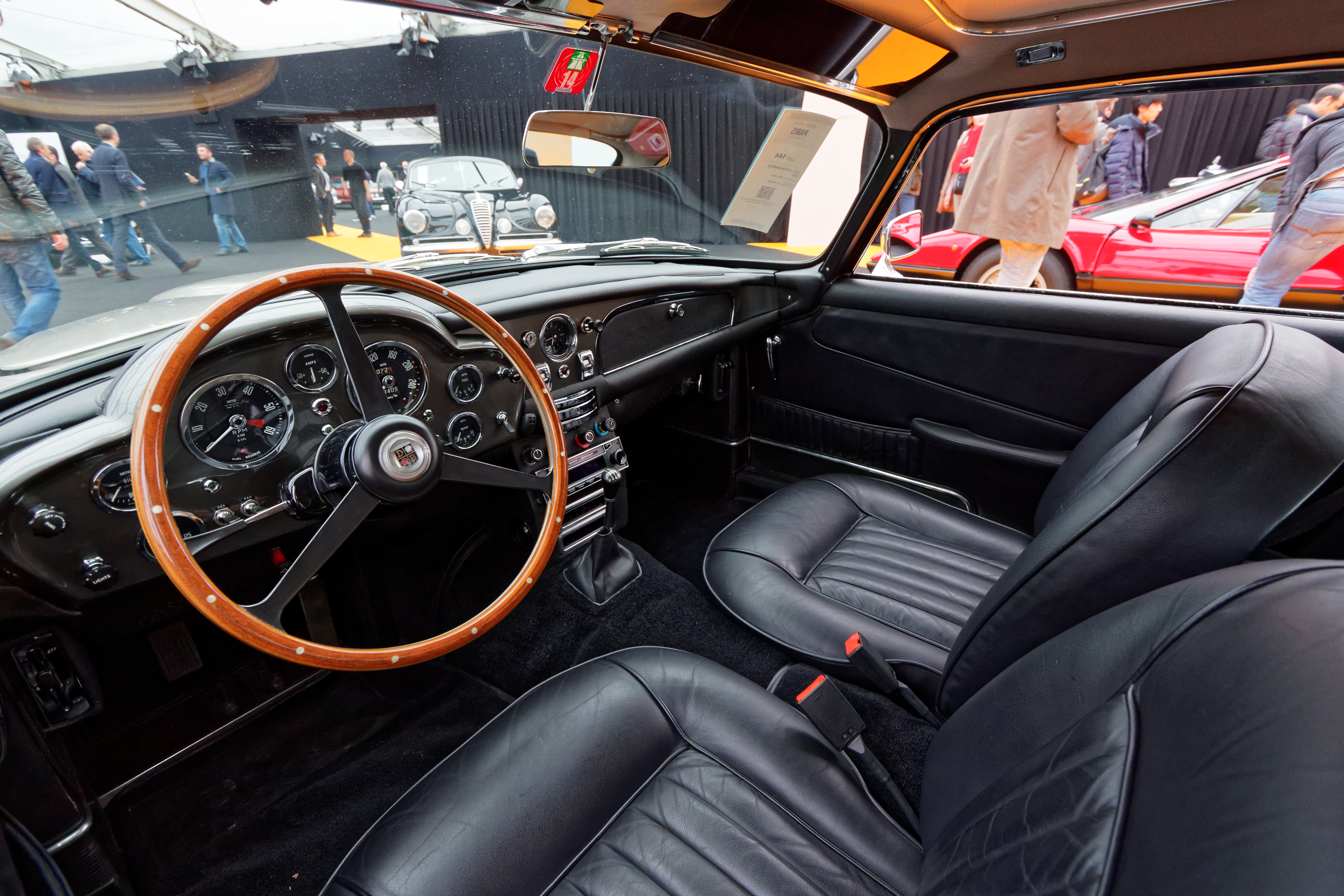
Interior

The principal differences between the DB4 Series V and the DB5 are the all-aluminium engine, enlarged from 3.7 litres to 4.0 litres; a new ZF five-speed transmission which was more robust than the earlier David Brown unit (except for some of the first DB5s); and three SU carburettors. This engine produced 282 bhp (210 kW) and propelled the car to 145 mph (233 km/h) and was available in the Vantage (high-powered) version of the DB4 from March 1962. It became the standard Aston Martin power unit with the launch in September 1963 of the DB5.

Standard equipment on the DB5 included reclining seats, wool-pile carpets, electric windows, twin fuel tanks, chrome wire wheels, an oil cooler, magnesium-alloy body built to the Superleggera patent technique, full leather trim in the cabin and a fire extinguisher. All models had two doors and a 2+2 seating configuration. The boot lids differed slightly between the DB4 Mark 5 and the DB5.

Like the DB4, the DB5 had a live rear axle. At the beginning, the original four-speed manual gearbox (with optional overdrive) was standard fitment, but it was dropped in favour of the ZF five-speed box. A three-speed Borg-Warner DG automatic transmission was also available. The automatic option was changed to the Borg-Warner Model 8 shortly before the DB6 replaced the DB5.

== Specifications ==
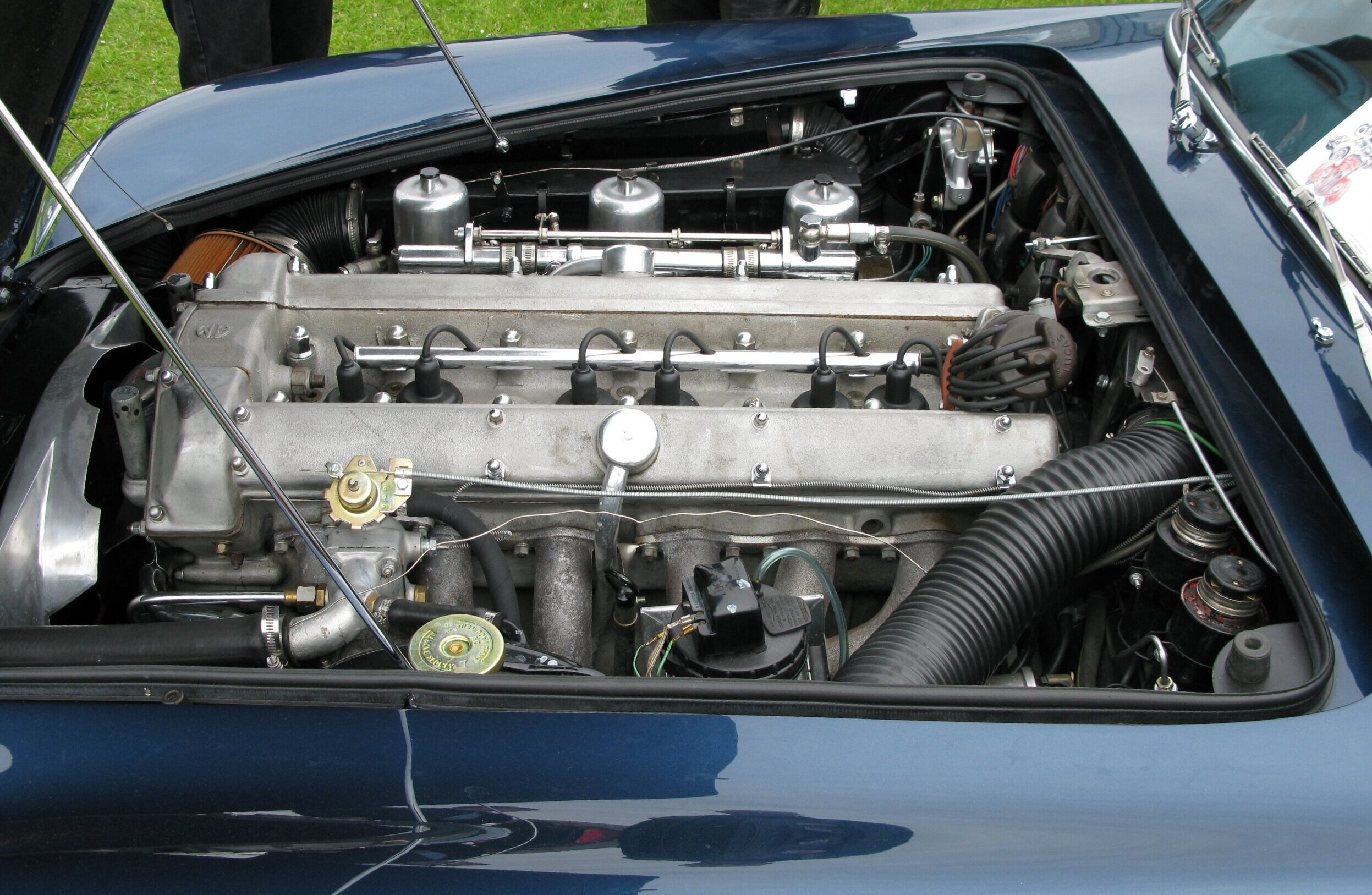
An Aston Martin DB5 engine.

Standard coupé:

- Engine: 4.0 L (3,995 cc) inline-six
- Bore x stroke: 96 mm × 92 mm (3.78 in × 3.62 in)
- Fuel feed: 3 SU carburettors
- Power: 282 bhp (286 PS; 210 kW) at 5,500 rpm, 210 bhp (213 PS; 157 kW) Net
- Torque: 288 lb⋅ft (390 N⋅m) at 3,850 rpm
- Weight: 1,502 kg (3,311 lb)
- Top speed: 145 mph (233 km/h)
- 0–60 mph (97 km/h) acceleration: 8 seconds.

== Variants ==
=== DB5 Vantage ===
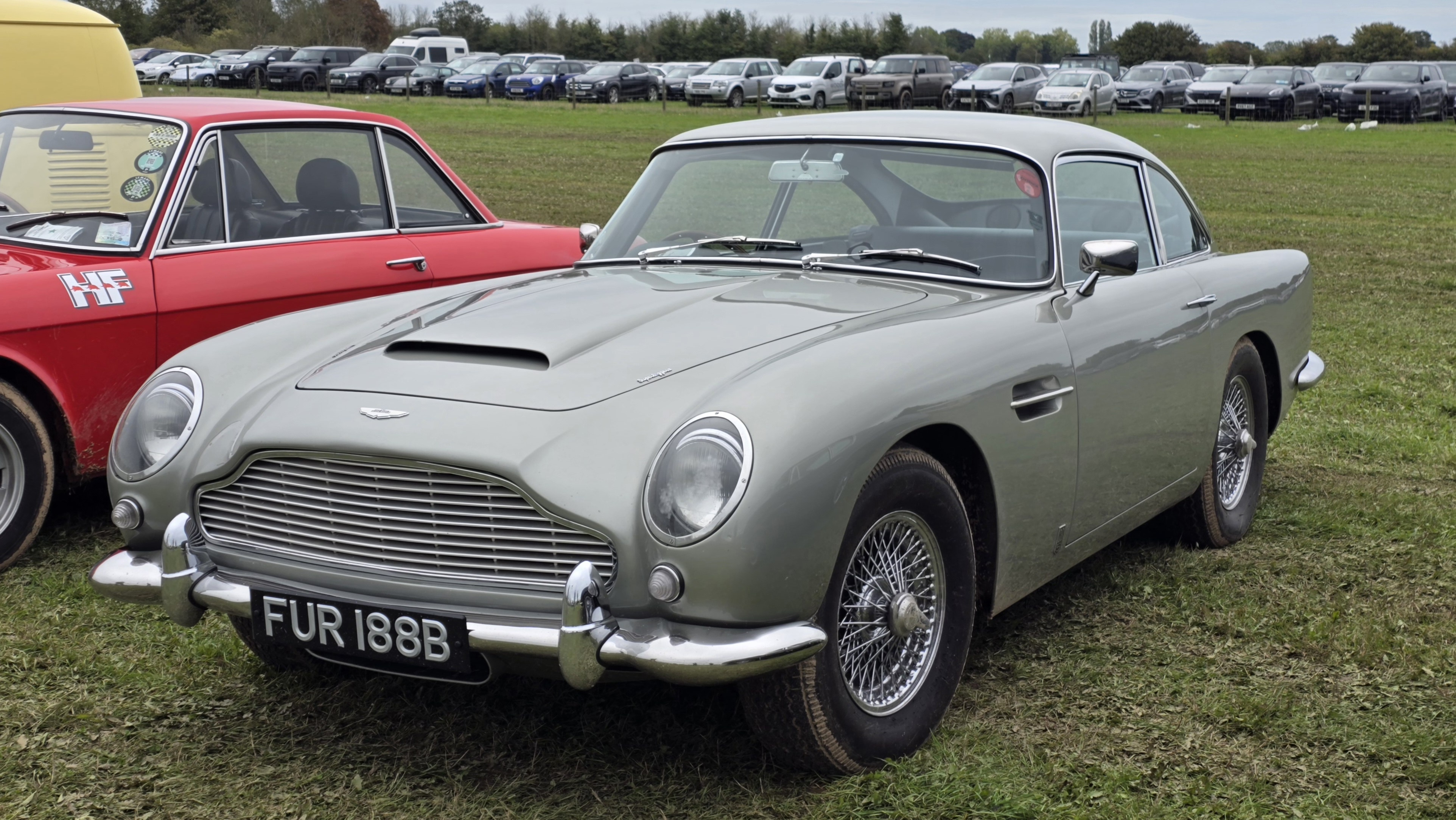
Aston Martin DB5 Vantage.

The high-performance DB5 Vantage was introduced in 1964. It featured three Weber carburettors and revised camshaft profiles. This engine produced 325 bhp (330 PS; 242 kW) at 5,500 rpm. 65 DB5 Vantage coupés were built.

In December 2025, Aston Martin completed a three-year, £400,000 restoration of a rare version of a 1965 Vantage at the company's works in Newport Pagnell. The Vantage, with silver birch paintwork, a higher-output engine and right-hand drive, was one of only 39 built. The work took 2,500 hours. The car was bought second-hand for £900 in 1973 and had been left to decay since the late 1970s. The owner said he had been determined to restore it, and he and his wife had "saved and sacrificed" to raise the money. The estimated value of the restored car was £1 million.

=== DB5 convertible ===
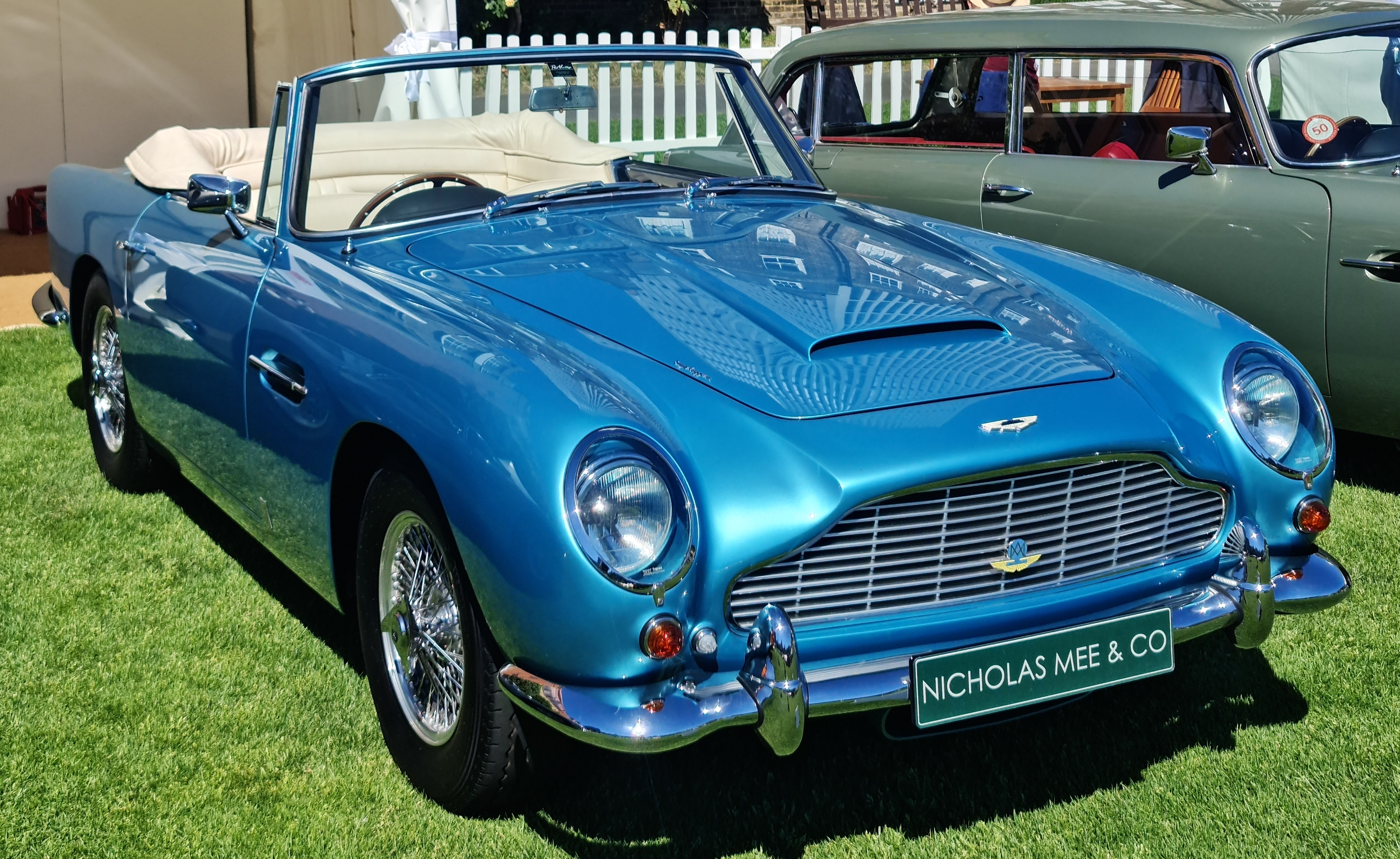
1964 DB5 convertible.

123 convertible DB5s were produced (also with bodies by Touring), though they did not carry the 'Volante' name until 1965. The convertible model was offered from 1963 to 1965. Originally, only 19 of the 123 DB5 Convertibles made were left-hand drive. 12 cars were originally fitted with a factory Vantage engine, and at least one further convertible was later factory-fitted with a DB6-specification Vantage engine. A rare factory option (fitted by Works Service prior to customer delivery) was a steel removable hardtop.

From October 1965 to October 1966, Aston Martin used the last 37 DB5 chassis to build another convertible model. These 37 cars were known as "Short Chassis" Volantes and were the first Aston Martins to carry the 'Volante' name. The "short" came from comparison with the subsequent DB6, which had a longer chassis, although it was the same size as the DB5. These cars differed from the DB5 convertible models in featuring DB6 split front and rear bumpers and Triumph TR4 rear lights, as also used on the DB6.

=== DB5 shooting-brake ===
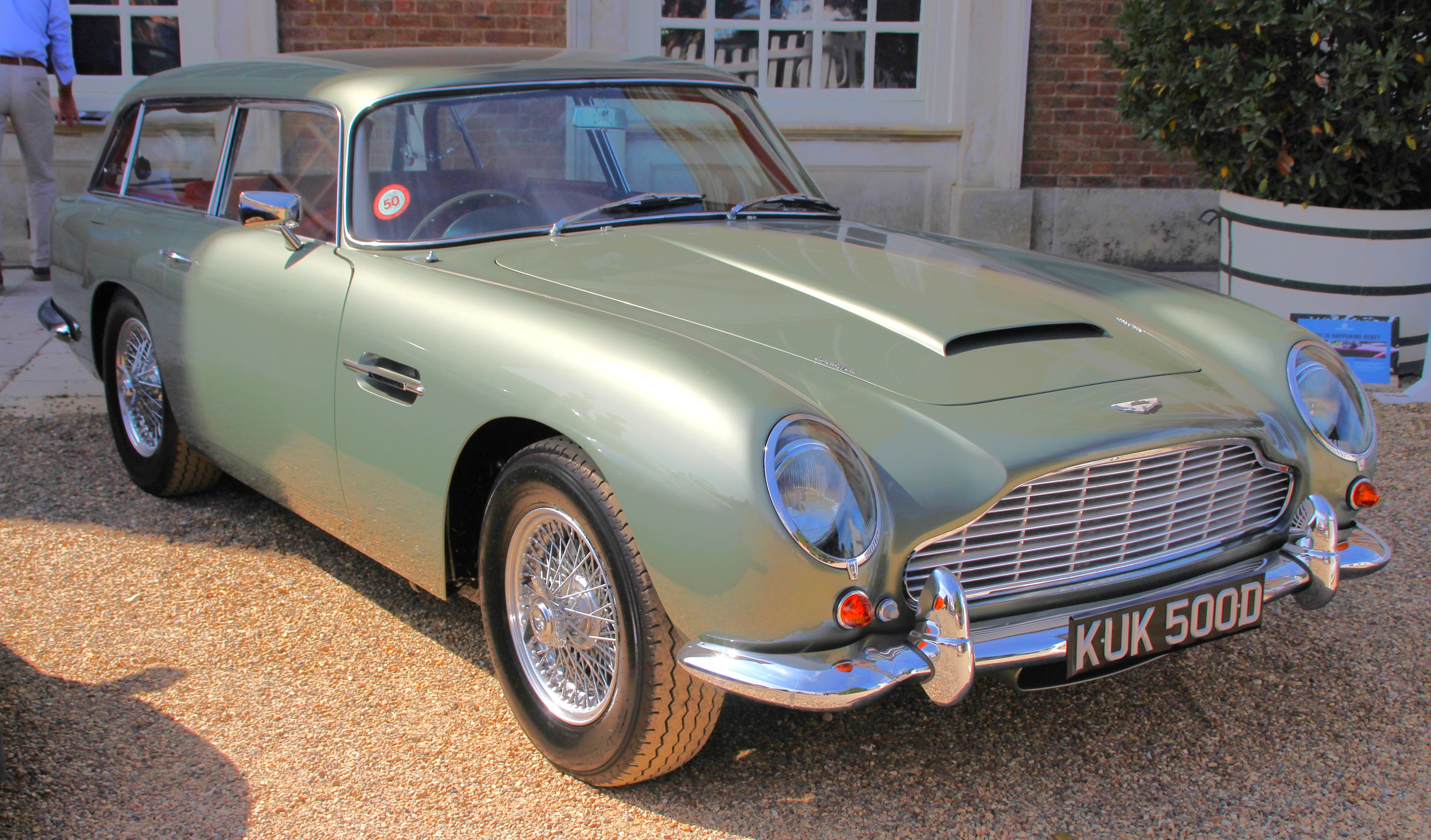
DB5 shooting-brake.

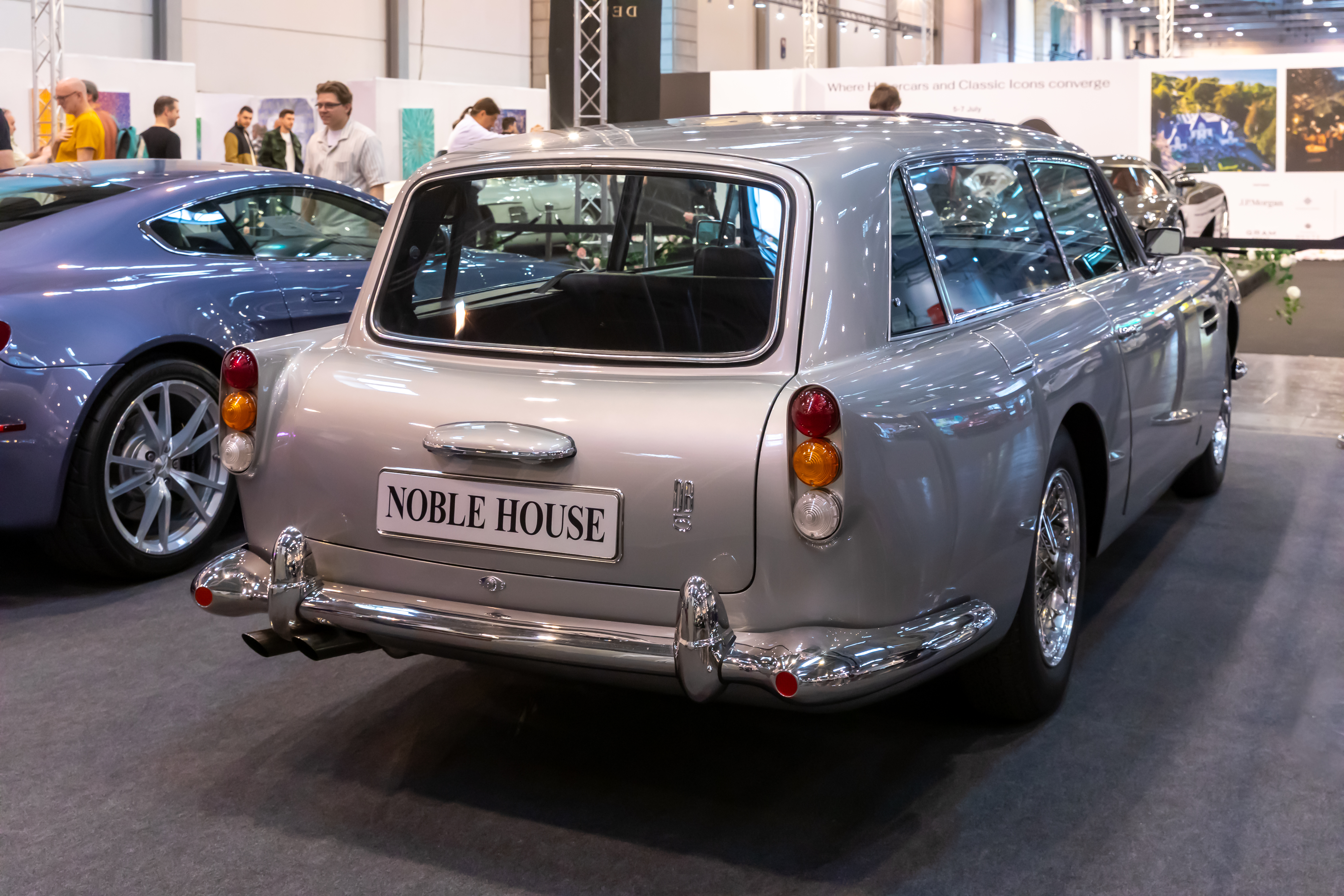
Rear view of a shooting-brake

A prototype DB5 shooting-brake was custom-built by the factory for David Brown, an avid hunter and dog owner, and a further 11 or 12 coupés were custom-modified for Aston Martin by independent coachbuilder Harold Radford. The tail lights used were Triumph units, and these were also adopted for the succeeding DB6. In August 2019 a DB5 Shooting Brake sold for a record $1.765m (£1.456m), making it the most valuable Shooting Brake-bodied car of any marque sold at auction.

== James Bond's DB5 ==
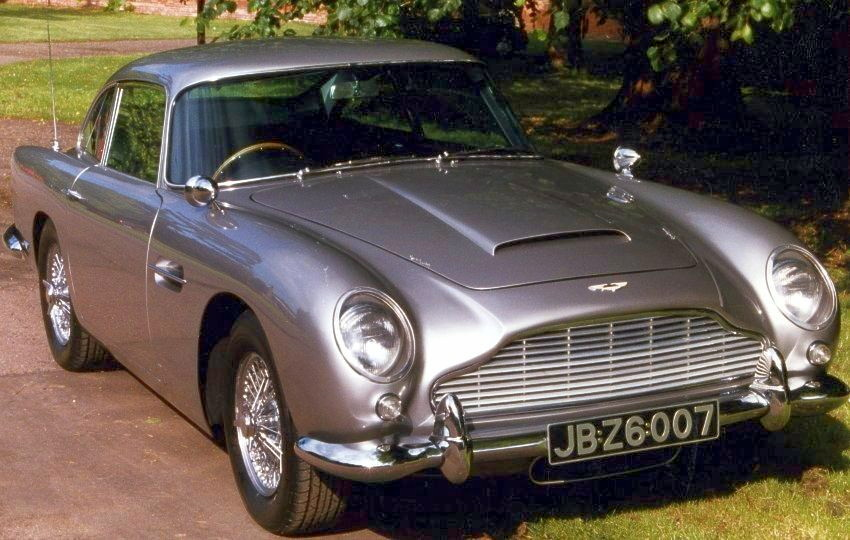
Two Aston Martin DB5s were supplied to EON Productions, one of which had no gadgets.

The Aston Martin DB5 became widely known after special effects expert John Stears modified a DB5 for use by James Bond in the 1964 film Goldfinger. Author Ian Fleming had placed Bond in a DB Mark III in the novel, but Stears persuaded the company to make its DB5 prototype available.

There were a total of four Goldfinger DB5s. Two of these were used in filming, and two were used only for promotional purposes. The first filming car, DP/216/1, was fitted with gadgets. This DB5 was the original prototype and was painted Dubonnet Red. Before it appeared in Goldfinger, it was used in episode 2.17, "The Noble Sportsman," of The Saint. Aston Martin later stripped this car, chassis number DP/216/1, of its weaponry and gadgetry and resold it. Subsequent owners retrofitted it with non-original weaponry, and it later appeared in the film The Cannonball Run (1981), driven by Roger Moore. Chassis DP/216/1 DB5 was stolen in 1997 from its last owner in Florida and was reported to be still missing in 2021. The second filming car, DB5/1486/R, was used for driving scenes and had no gadgets. After filming, the team added gadgets, and the car was used for promotion. It featured the pop-out gun barrels behind the front indicators, the bullet shield behind the rear window, and a three-way revolving front number plate showing "LU 6789" or "4711-EA-62" or "BMT 216A." In 2010, RM Auctions sold this car for $4.6 million to Harry Yeaggy. The first publicity car, DB5/2017/R, was acquired by the Louwman Museum in The Hague. The second publicity car, DB5/2008/R, was auctioned by RM Sotheby's in August 2019 for $6.4 million to an unknown buyer. These two cars were displayed at the 1964 New York World's Fair to promote the film. Sales of the DB5 increased after it was described as "the most famous car in the world".

After Goldfinger, the Aston Martin DB5 became closely associated with the James Bond franchise. The same car (registration BMT 216A) was used again in the next film, Thunderball, a year later. The DB5 is considered to be the quintessential vehicle associated with the Bond character, and it has reappeared in subsequent Bond films.

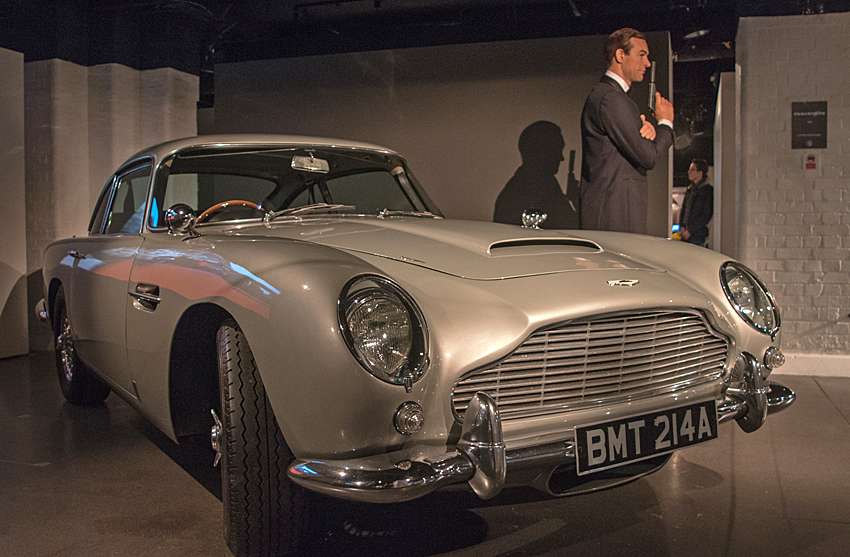
Aston Martin DB5 used for the film GoldenEye

A different DB5 (registration BMT 214A) was used in the 1995 Bond film GoldenEye, in which the car was Bond's personal vehicle and had no gadgets - although it did come equipped with a champagne cooler in the armrest and a fax machine. Three different DB5s were used for filming. This same car briefly reappeared in the next film, Tomorrow Never Dies (1997). It was set to make a cameo appearance in the Scotland scenes in The World Is Not Enough (1999), but most of these scenes were cut in the final edit. Another DB5 (registration 56526) appeared in Casino Royale (2006), this time owned by the villain, Alex Dimitrios. This car had Bahamian number plates and was left-hand drive (unlike the previous British versions, which were right-hand drive). In the film, Bond wins the car from Dimitrios after beating him in a card game.

The Goldeneye DB5 was put on display at the London Film Museum in Covent Garden. Of the three cars used in the production, one car, DB5/2187/R, was filmed for the static ocean-side shot. A second car, DB5/1885/R, was driven in the chase scene against a Ferrari in Monte Carlo. This car sold at a Christie's auction in 2001 and entered the Guinness Book of Records that year as the highest price paid for an item of Bond memorabilia. It appeared in the Bond exhibition at Beaulieu before moving to a new home in the London Film Museum. The third car, chassis number DB5/1484/R, was retained by the movie production company, Eon Productions, and appeared in later Bond movies.

Another silver-birch DB5 with the original registration BMT 216A was used in the 23rd James Bond film, Skyfall, which coincided with the 50th anniversary of the release of the first Bond film, Dr. No, in 1962. The car is destroyed in the film's climactic finale, although a highly detailed 1/3rd scale model was constructed for the destruction scenes. Two cars were used during filming: DB5/1484/R (first seen in GoldenEye) and a second car, DB5/2007/R. It is seen again in Spectre (2015), firstly in Q's underground workshop in various stages of rebuild, and at the film's ending, fully rebuilt, with Bond driving it away.

In 2019, Aston Martin confirmed that the car would be featured in the next Bond film, No Time to Die, set for release in October 2021. The plan was to build replicas and not use existing vehicles. Eight replica DB5 stunt cars were built for the movie. The DB5 seen in a high-speed chase at the start of the film was sold for £2.92 million at a charity auction in London in 2022.

=== Remade ===
In 2020, as the next phase of the Continuation programme which had started in 2017 with the reborn DB4GT, Aston Martin began construction of 25 new DB5 Goldfinger-themed cars at the factory in Newport Pagnell, north Buckinghamshire, where the first DB5s were built. The cars were authentic reproductions of Bond's Goldfinger DB5 and were fitted with most of the spy gadgets seen in the film. Several of the gadgets were designed to be functional, including smoke screen, simulated oil slick delivery system, revolving number plates, and rear bullet shield.

Wherever possible, Aston Martin used the same manufacturers as were used in the original 1963-65 production run. ZF Friedrichshafen, for example, supplied the transmission and Connolly Leather supplied the interiors. As in the 1960s, the aluminium body panels were hand-made and fitted by hand to a steel chassis. The engine was a 290bhp 4.0 litre inline six-cylinder with three SU carburettors, mated to a five-speed ZF manual transmission, and the cars were finished in the same Silver Birch colour scheme as the original. The Goldfinger DB5s were created in association with the producers of the James Bond films, EON Productions. It was intended that they would sell for about £2.75 million each. The first of the new cars rolled off the production line at the beginning of July 2020.

=== Promotional items ===
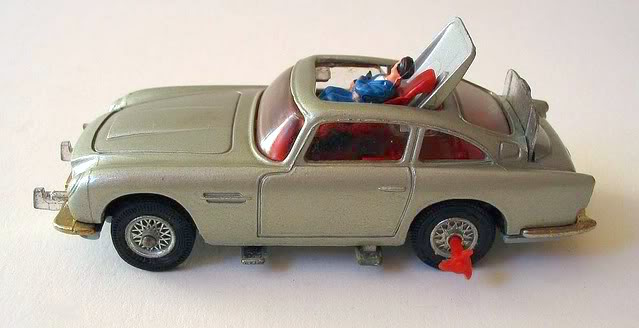
1964 Aston Martin DB5, produced by Corgi, as a tie-in to the film.

With Goldfinger, Corgi began its decades-long relationship with the Bond franchise. They produced a model of the car which became the biggest selling toy of 1964. A detailed 1:24 scale plastic kit of the James Bond DB5 was produced by Airfix between 1966 and 1970.

The Danbury Mint produced a highly detailed 1:24 scale die-cast DB5 model with many working features in 2006 as a limited edition for Casino Royale.

In January 2011, a 1/8 scale model was released by part work magazine publisher GE Fabbri in the UK. Over 85 weekly parts, the model built into one of the biggest 007 scale models, with working gadgets and lights.

In 2015, Hot Wheels Elite released their Cult Classics Goldfinger Aston Martin DB5 in 1/18 and 1/43 scale, the 1/18 model featuring many of the gadgets from the original film.

In July 2018, LEGO unveiled a 1:8 scale 1,290-piece DB5 construction set with front machine guns, hidden telephone, ejector seat, bullet shield, tyre shredders and the homing screen in the cockpit. In June 2022, The Lego Group announced that a construction set of James Bond's Aston Martin DB5 would be released in August 2022 as part of the Lego Speed Champions range.

=== Two-thirds scale replicas ===
The Little Car Company in Bicester, UK, in partnership with Aston Martin Lagonda, created 'Junior Edition', two-thirds scale, electric-powered replicas of the DB5 convertible, the DB5 Vantage and the No Time to Die DB5, which were priced between £35,000 and £90,000. The cars were built using 3D scans of the original.

== See also ==
- List of James Bond vehicles
