= Aston Martin DB6 =

Grand tourer produced by Aston Martin (1965–1971)

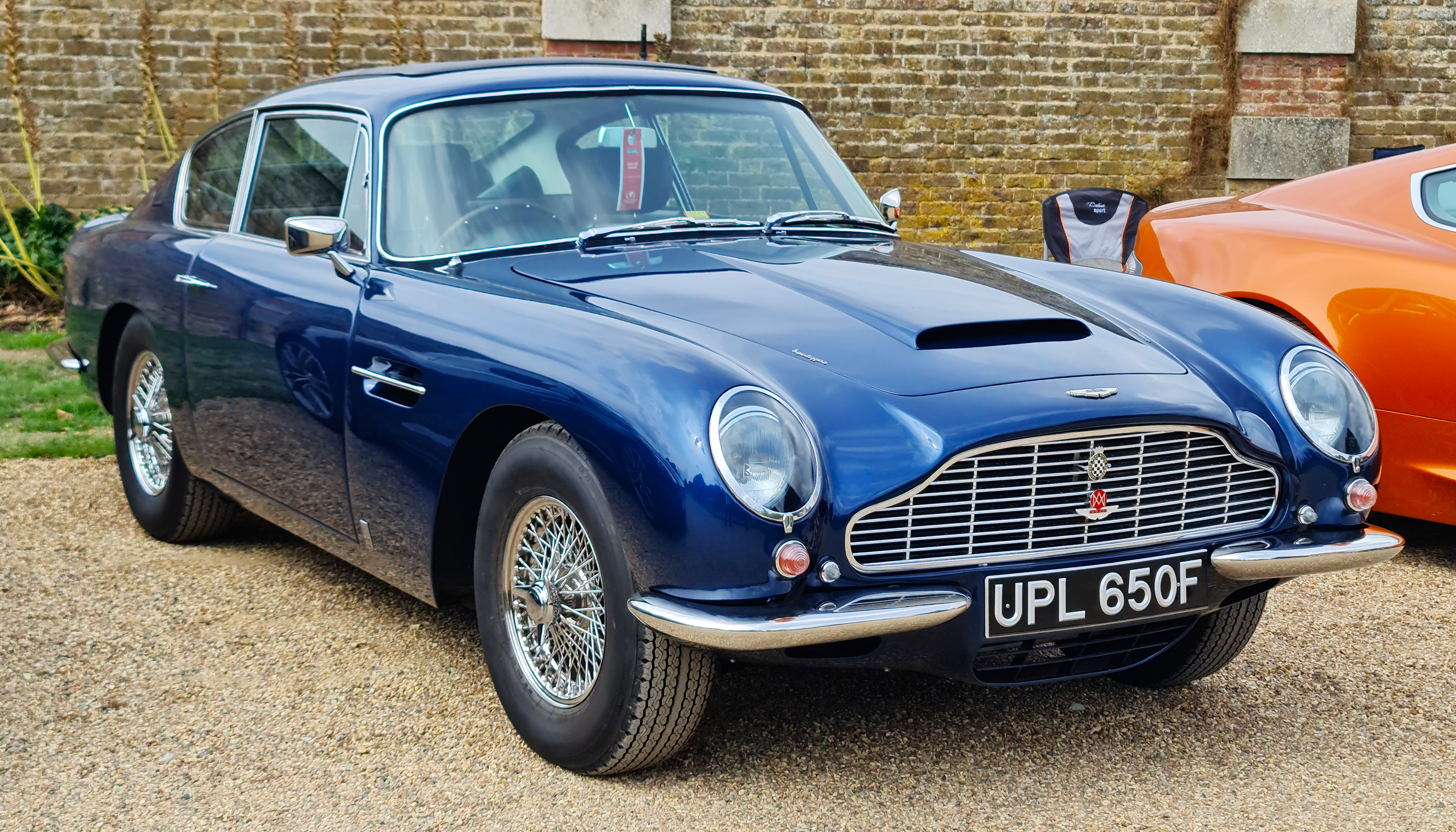
- 1967 Aston Martin DB6 Mk.I

Overview
- Manufacturer: Aston Martin
- Production: September 1965 – January 1971; 1,788 produced
- Assembly: United Kingdom: Newport Pagnell, England
- Designer: Federico Formenti at Carrozzeria Touring Superleggera

Body and chassis
- Class: Grand tourer
- Body style: 2-door 2+2 coupé four-seat convertible (Volante)
- Layout: FR layout

Powertrain
- Engine: 4.0 L Marek DOHC I6
- Transmission: 5-speed ZF manual; 3-speed Borg-Warner automatic

Dimensions
- Wheelbase: 101.5 in (2,578 mm)
- Length: 182 in (4,623 mm)
- Width: 66 in (1,676 mm)
- Height: 53.5 in (1,359 mm)
- Kerb weight: 3,250 lb (1,474 kg)

Chronology
- Predecessor: Aston Martin DB5
- Successor: Aston Martin DBS (1967–1972); Aston Martin DB7

The Aston Martin DB6 is a grand tourer made by British car manufacturer Aston Martin and was produced from September 1965 to January 1971. The "DB" designation is from the initials of David Brown who built up the company from 1947 onwards.

The DB6 succeeded the Aston Martin DB5 and featured improved aerodynamics and specification over its predecessor.

== History and design ==
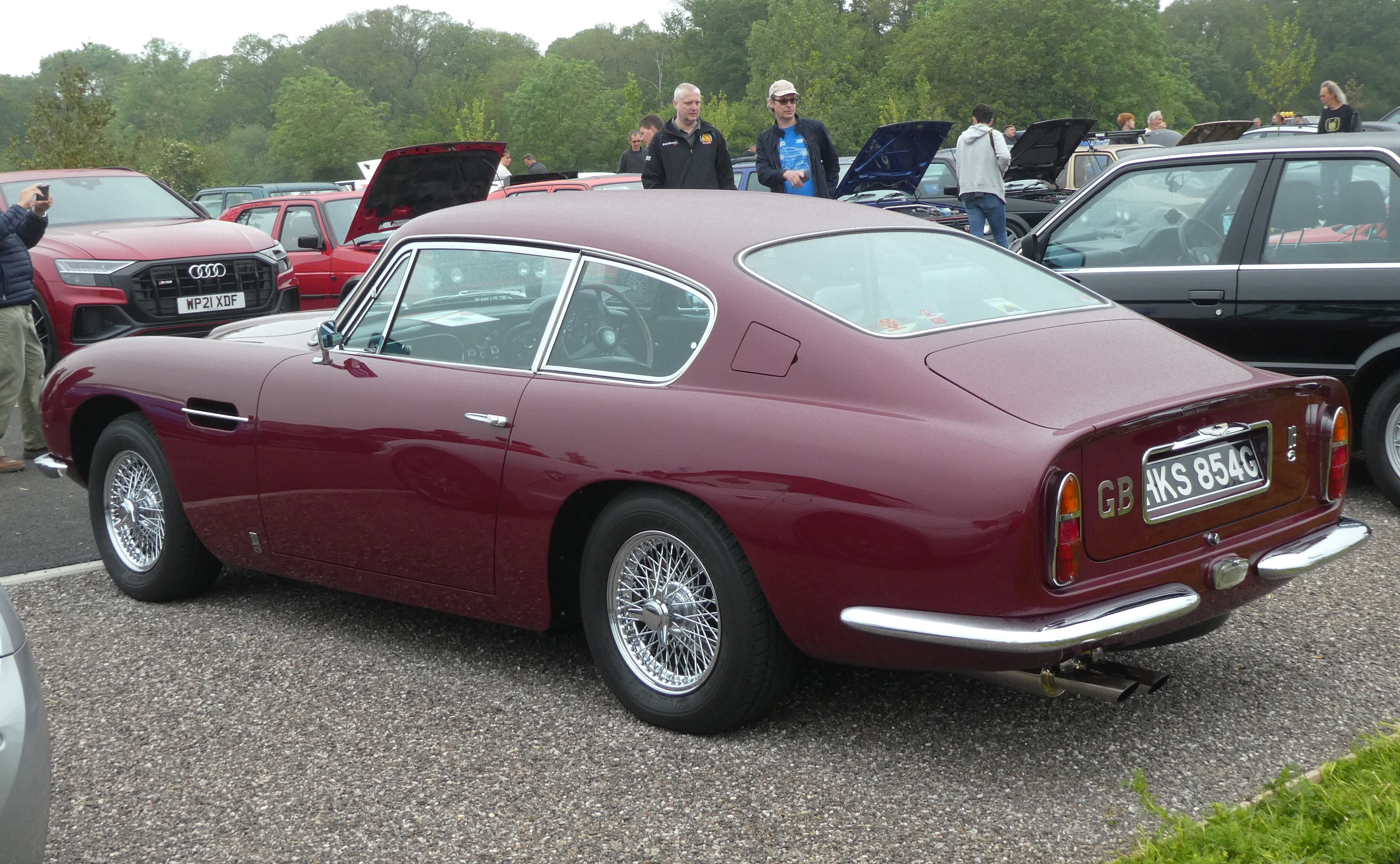
Rear view

After Aston Martin rejected proposals for a replacement for its DB5 from the original DB4 Touring of Milan, the decision was made to focus on their own development car, registered 4 YMC. Wind tunnel testing, begun in February 1965, showed development was necessary to counteract a tendency toward aerodynamic lift [a result of the fastback styling] causing reduced rear-wheel traction at high speed. Final development phases relied upon DB5 chassis, suitably lengthened and titled MP 219, with rear lip-spoiler and abbreviated Kammback tail Aston Martin previously incorporated in sports-racing prototypes. The decision was made to produce MP 219 as the Aston Martin DB6 although the prototype de Dion rear axle was rejected, Aston's soldiering on with its live-axle configuration reducing time to market, cost and complexity.

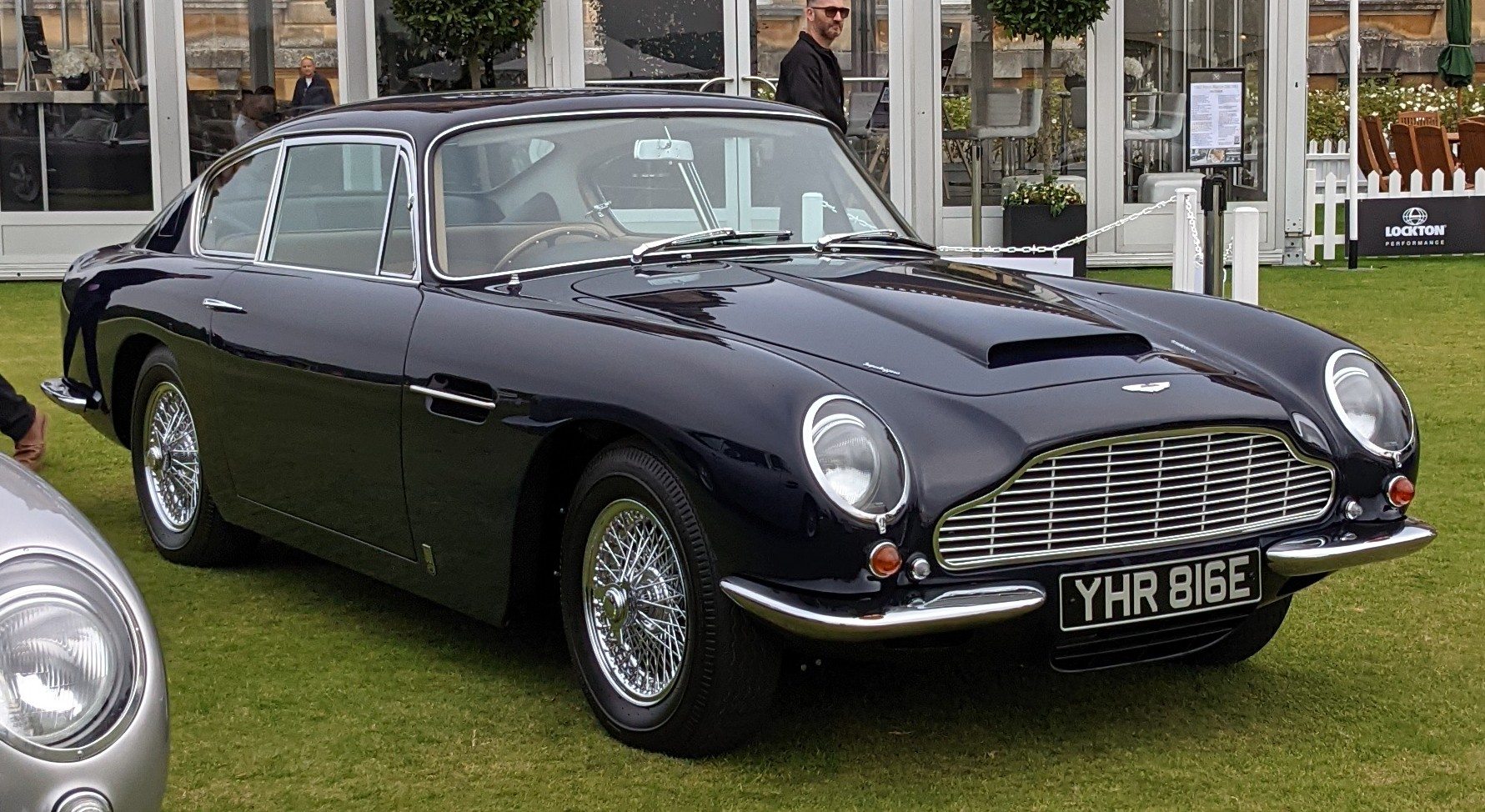
1967 DB6 Vantage (Mark I)

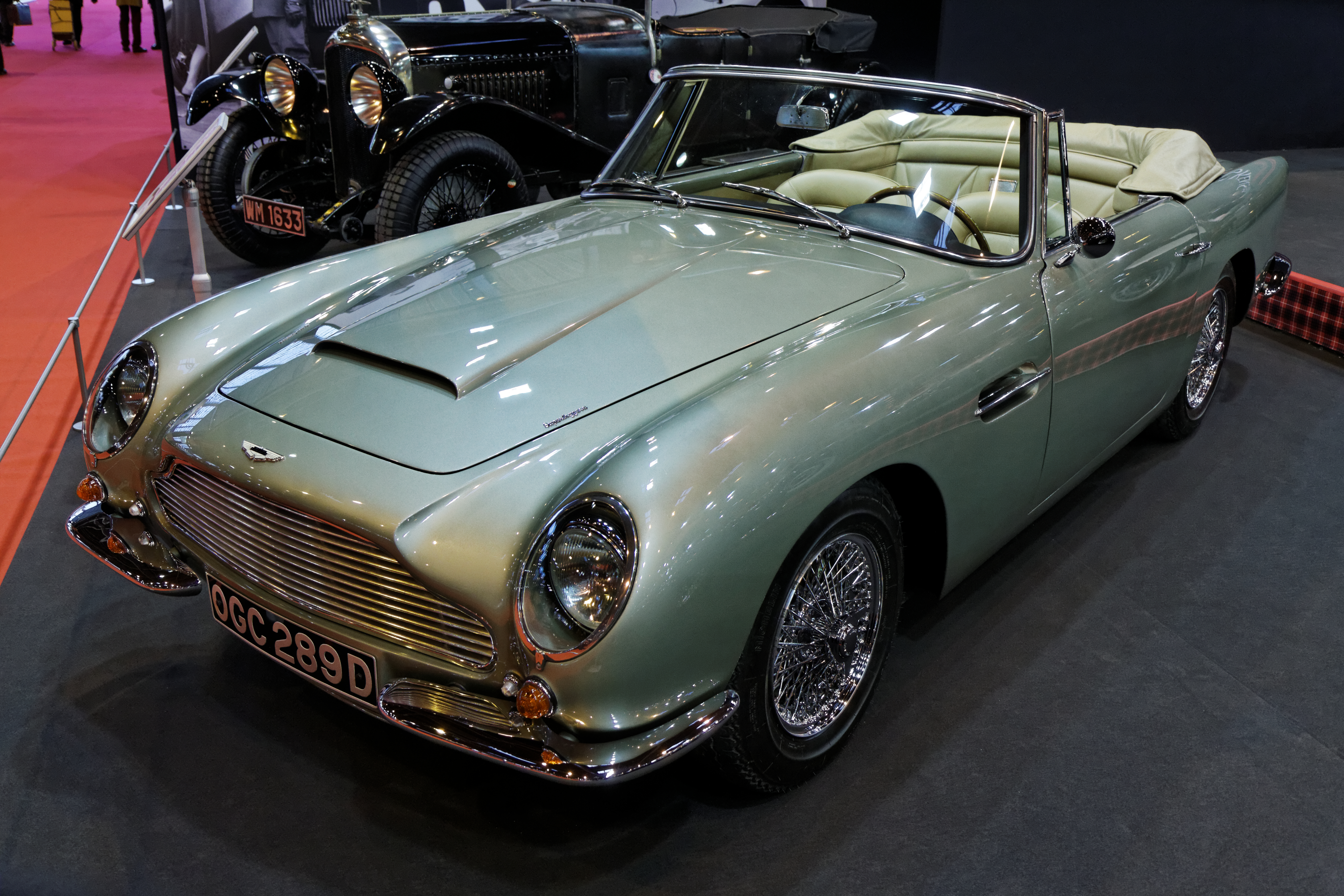
The 1965–1966 DB6 "Short Chassis" Volantes were based on leftover DB5 chassis.

Introduced at the 1965 London Motor Show, the DB6 was already a dated design notable as the first model engineered following a factory relocation from Feltham to Newport Pagnell. The DB6 has a resemblance to its predecessor, the DB5; with the most noticeable differences being its wheelbase, side profile, split front and rear bumpers and rear panels incorporating the Kammback tail rear end. The tail, combined with the relocated rear-axle and the 3.75-inch (95 mm) lengthened wheelbase, provide more stability at high speed. Though fashionable – the rear-end Kamm-styled design was similar to the Ferrari 250 – it did not prove popular with conservative, tradition oriented Aston clientele when the DB6 was introduced. Performance was satisfactory: road-tests of the day observed top speed of the Vantage model between 145 mph (233 km/h) to 148 mph (238 km/h), with John Bolster aboard a Vantage spec DB6 reaching a two-way average of 152 mph (245 km/h).

The DB6 continued with then high-tech Armstrong Selectaride cockpit-adjustable rear shock absorbers as available on the DB5. Other highlights include adopting front-door quarter windows, an oil-cooler air scoop low on the front valance, quarter-bumpers at each corner, revised tail-lamp clusters. Additionally, the spoiler affected the overall proportions of the DB6, with an increase in length by approximately two inches.

Other notable changes:

- Roof line raised by two inches improving headroom especially for rear seat passengers
- Genuinely useful leg room for rear passengers
- More steeply raked albeit taller windscreen
- Split front and rear bumpers
- Standard chrome wire wheels on bias-ply whitewall tyres (in USA market)
- Optional 185VR15 Pirelli Cinturato CA67 radial tyres
- Optional power steering
- Optional air conditioning
- Standard ZF five-speed manual unit or a BorgWarner three-speed automatic gearbox available at no extra cost
- Optional Vantage specification retaining triple side-draft Weber 45DCOE carburettors with other minor revisions raising quoted output to 325 hp

Another improvement from the DB5 to DB6 was a change to the superleggera construction technique patented by coachbuilder/stylist Touring of Milan. Instead of the alloy body being supported by steel tubes of even size and strength over a steel punt chassis, as in the DB4 and DB5, the DB6 used a similar punt chassis with a mixture of metal tubes and other steel sections of varying size, weight, complexity, and strength depending on where in the structure the steel support was fitted. This was still "Superleggera" construction and Aston Martin were still required to pay a £5 royalty on each DB6 made to use the "Superleggera" patent, and DB6s all have a "Touring of Milan" and "Superleggera" patent/licence plate in the engine bay and "Superleggera" badges on the bonnet. This practice only stopped when "Touring of Milan" shut down and some later DB6s no longer carry the badging, nor the "Touring of Milan" licence plate, as the royalty was no longer needed to be paid. However, the construction method remained the same for early and late cars. It is a common mistake that early cars are "Superleggera" and later cars are not, just because they don't carry the badging nor the patent plate. This revision to the "Superleggera" system meant that the weight increase of the DB6 over the DB5 was minimal (7.7 kg (17 lb)), despite being a longer car.

== Specifications ==
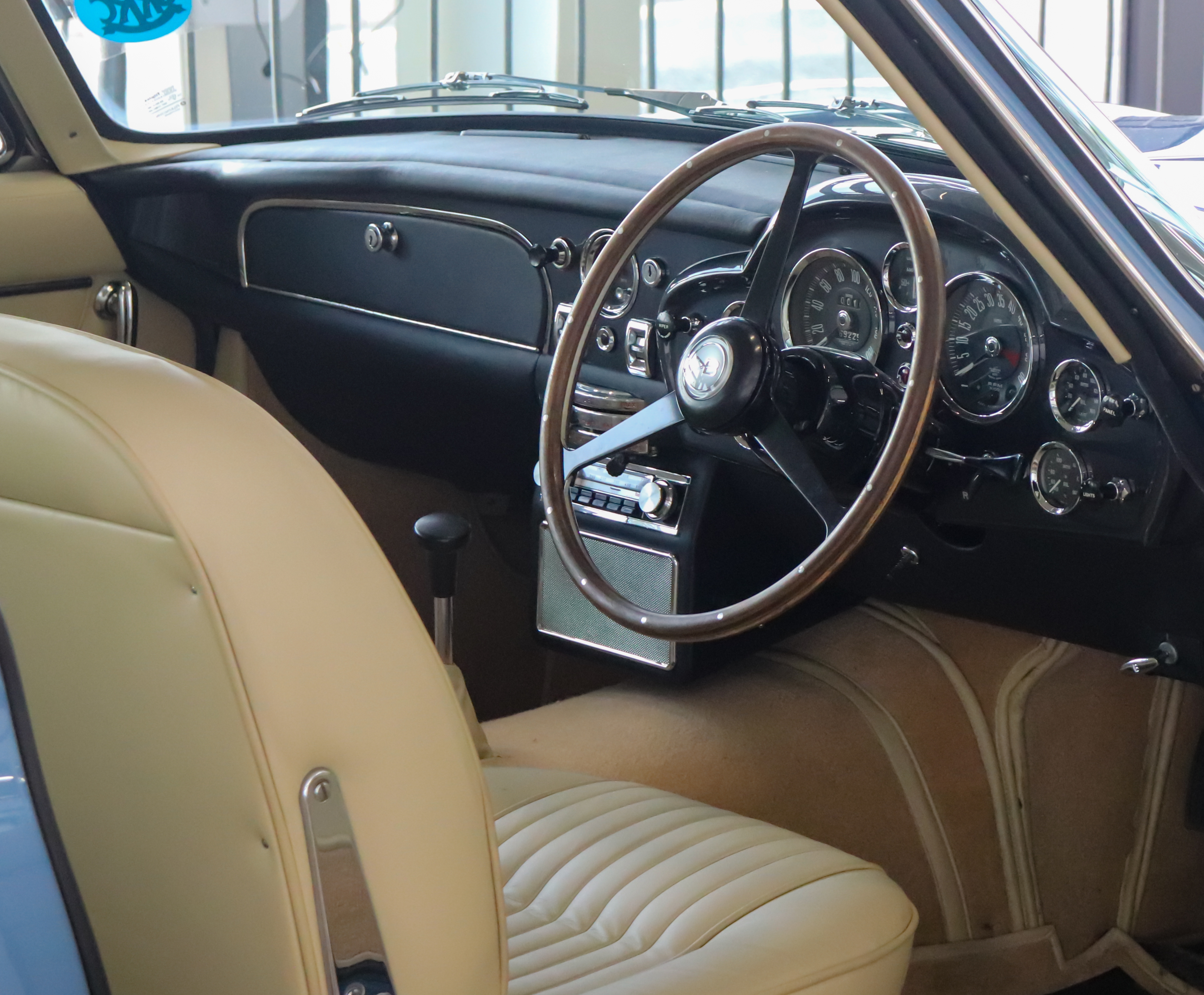
1971 Aston Martin DB6 Interior

The DB6 is powered by the 4.0 L (3,995 cc) twin-overhead camshaft (DOHC), in-line six-cylinder Aston Martin engine designed by Tadek Marek. The engine, continued with its triple SU carb setup producing 282 bhp (210 kW; 286 PS) at 5,500 rpm; the Vantage engine option is quoted at 325 bhp (242 kW; 330 PS) against the 314 bhp (234 kW; 318 PS) of the DB5. The DB6 was approximately 17 lb (7.7 kg) heavier than its predecessor, but offered better stability at high speed, added luggage capacity and added comforts for passengers. The rear suspension used helical coil springs with ride control that was adjustable from inside the car.

- Kerb weight: 1,474 kg (3,250 lb)
- Engine: 4.0 L (3,995 cc; 244 cu in) straight-6
- Compression ratio: standard=8.9:1; Vantage=9.4:1
- Power: 282 hp (210 kW) at 5500 rpm (standard engine)
- Power: 325 hp (242 kW) at 5750 rpm (optional Vantage engine)
- Torque: 400 N⋅m (295 lb⋅ft) at 4500 rpm
- Top speed: 150 mph (241 km/h)
- 0–60 mph (97 km/h) acceleration: 6.2 seconds
- Steering: rack and pinion with optional power assist
- Fuel tank capacity: 19 imp gallons (standard)
  16 imp gallons (with optional air conditioning fitted)

== Later models and variants ==
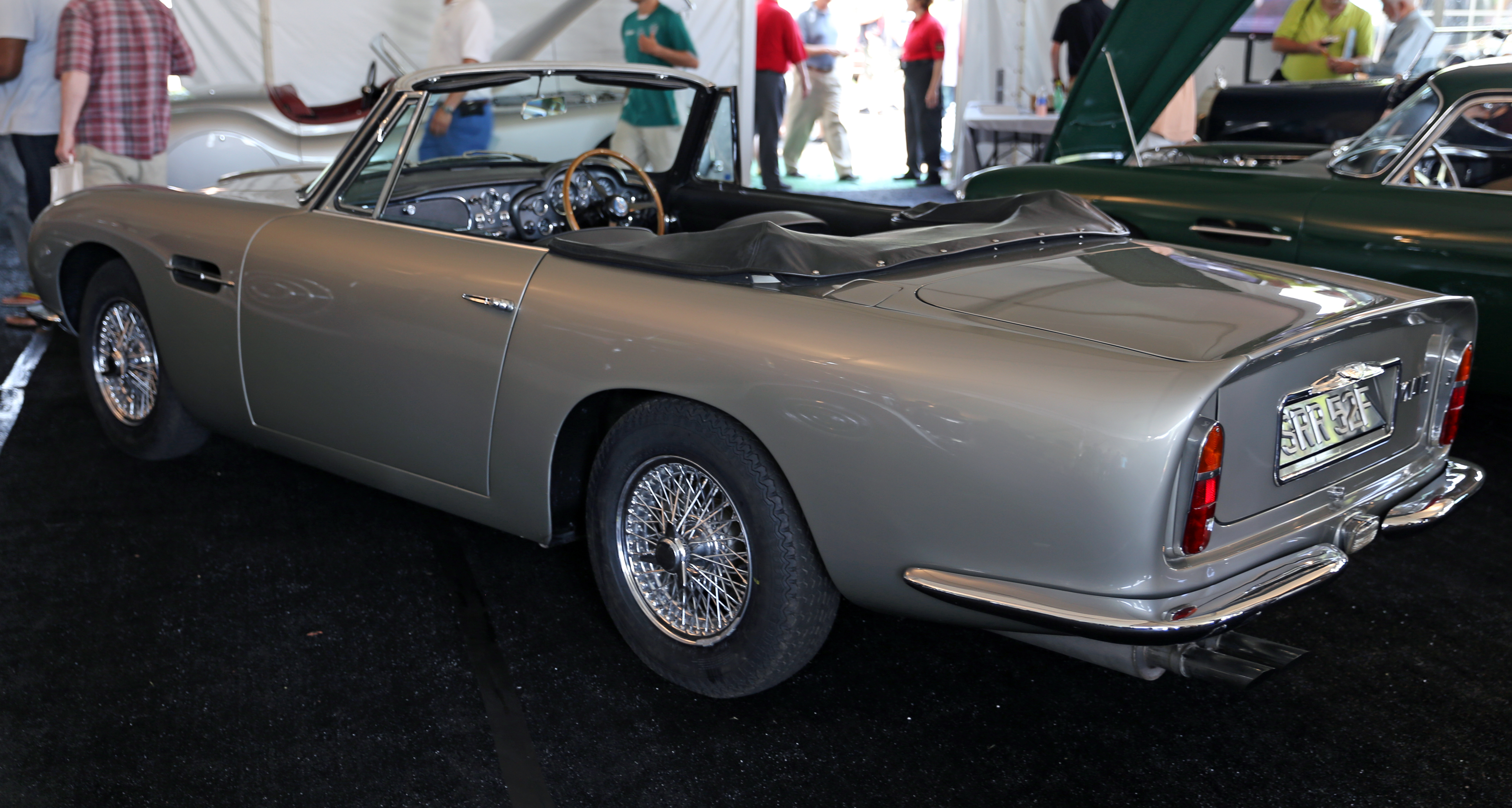
1967 Aston Martin Volante, DB6-based, Vantage-specs

The DB6 Mark II was announced on 21 August 1969, identified by distinct flares on front and rear wheel arches and wider 205VR15 Pirelli Cinturato CN72 radial or 815-15V15 Avon Crossply tyres on 1/2" wider wheels. Available as an optional extra for the Mark II was AE Brico electronic fuel-injection combined with the higher compression ratio cylinder head. The Mark II edition shared many parts with the then-new DBS.

As with previous Aston Martin models, a high-power DB6 Vantage was offered. It was equipped with three Weber carburettors and higher compression ratio cylinder head.

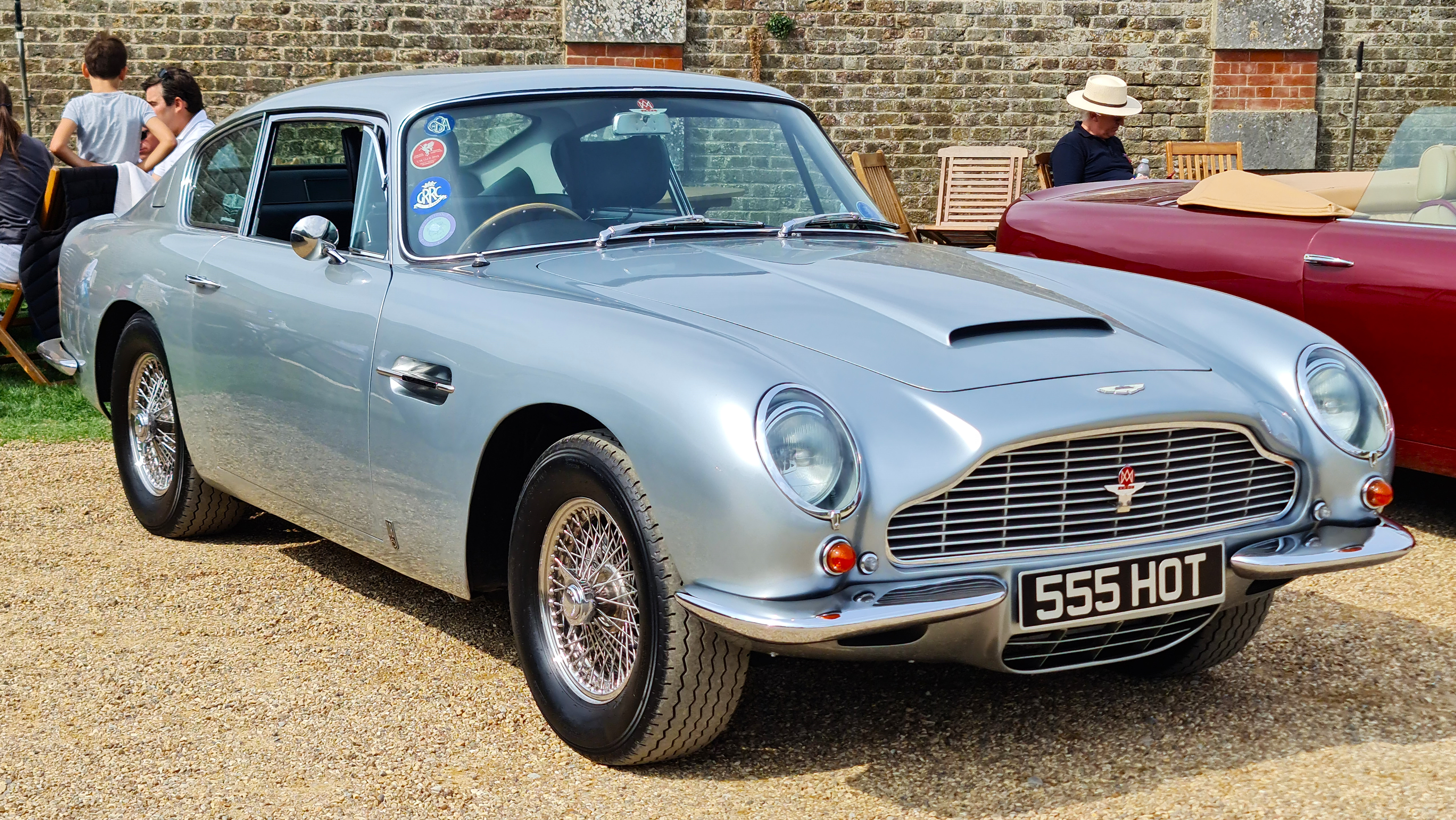
1970 Aston Martin DB6 Mark II

A convertible body style was also offered, named the Volante. This was introduced at the 1966 London Motor Show. The DB6-based Volante succeeded the earlier (1965–1966) Volantes which were built on the last of the DB5 chassis' and were known as "short chassis" Volantes. Of the later DB6-based Volantes just 140 were built, including 29 high-output Vantage Volante versions, highly prized by collectors.

Charles III owns a DB6-based Volante MkII that has been converted to run on E85.

=== Shooting Brake ===
A total of six DB6 Shooting-brakes were produced by British coachbuilder Harold Radford, with two more by FLM Panelcraft The engine options (282 and 325 hp) were the same as for the DB6 Saloon.

- Kerb weight: 1,587 kg (3,499 lb)
- Overall length: 180 in (4,572 mm)
- Overall width: 66 in (1,676 mm)
- Height: 52 in (1,321 mm)
- Turning radius: 34 feet
- Wheelbase: 98 in (2,489 mm)
- Track: 54 in (1,372 mm)(f)
  53.5 in (1,359 mm)(r)
- Fuel tank capacity: 16 imp gal (73 L; 19 US gal)

One of the Radford-built DB6 Shooting Brakes was the 1967 New York Auto Show car. The car was Roman Purple over Natural hide, LHD with factory AC, Borg-Warner automatic gearbox, LSD, Blaupunkt Köln radio with power antenna. It was purchased directly off the show stand by a Mr. S. Tananbaum for $22,500 (nearly 3x the price of a standard DB6), whose family maintained ownership until 2017. It was displayed at the 2018 Greenwich Concours d'Elegance.

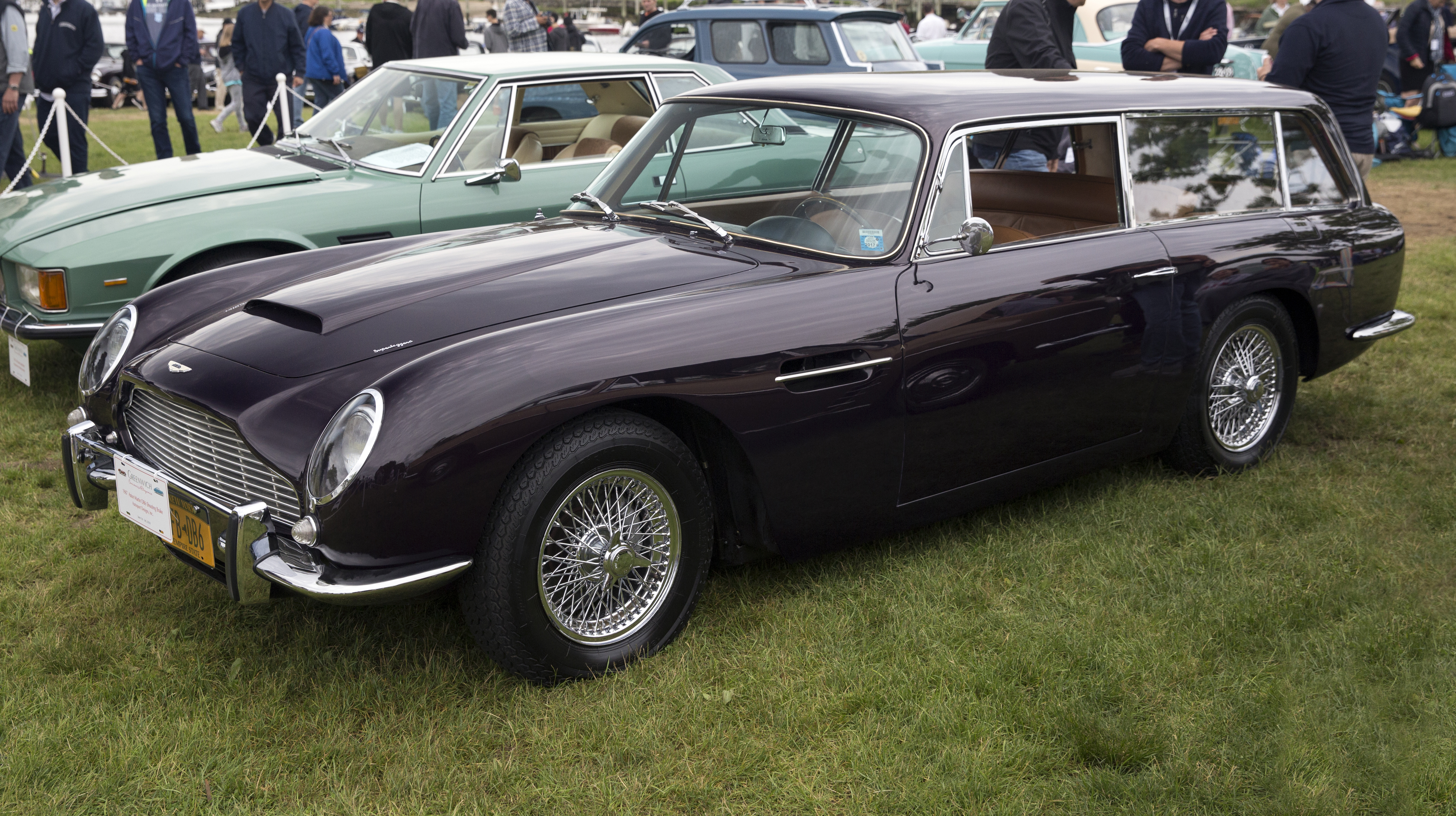
1967 Aston Martin DB6 Shooting Brake coachbuilt by Harold Radford at the 2018 Greenwich Concours d'Elegance

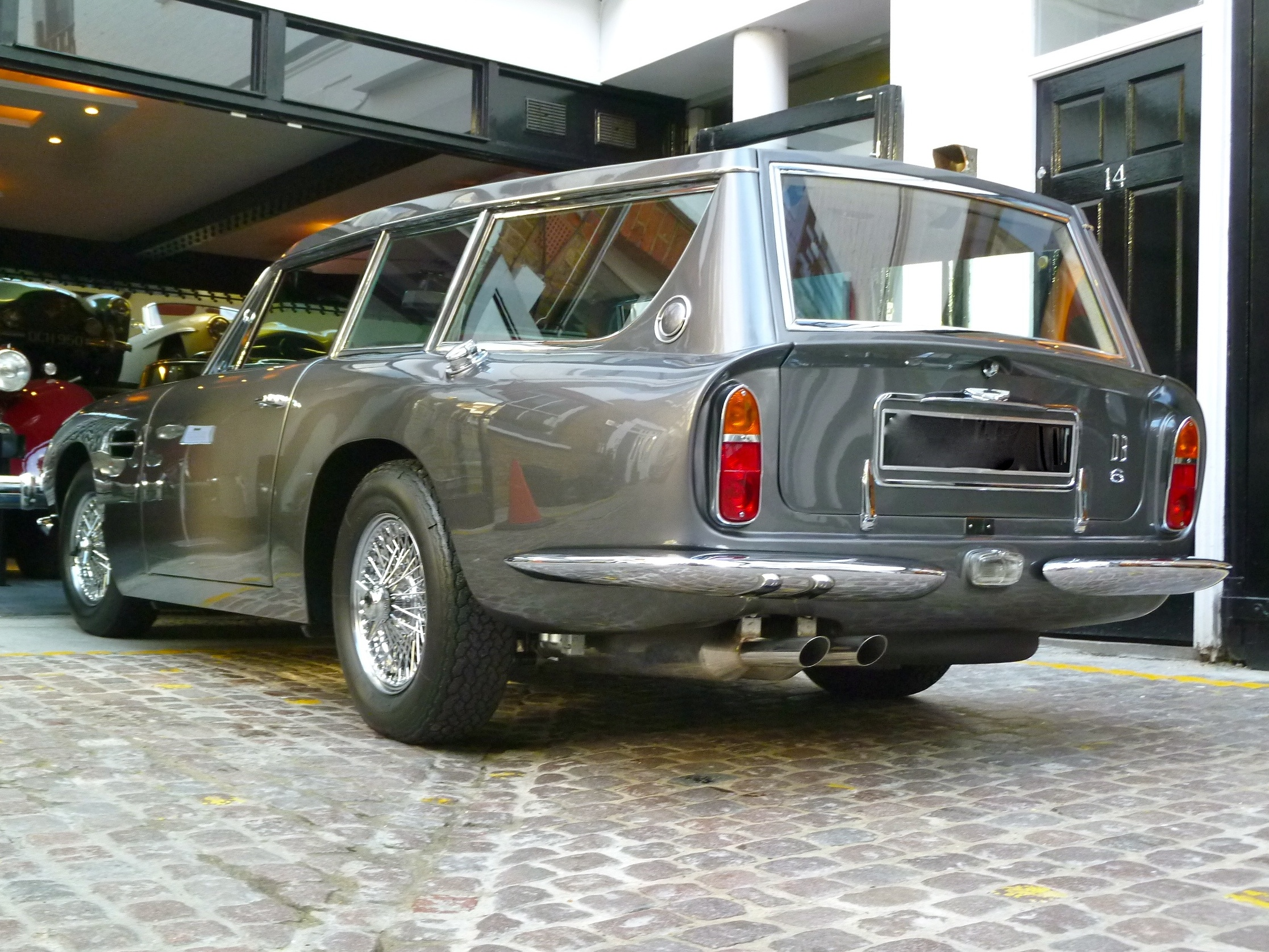
Aston Martin DB6 Shooting Brake coachbuilt by FLM Panelcraft

DB6 Shooting Brakes
Coachbuilder	Year	Chassis no.	Engine no.	Vantage spec.	Notes
Harold Radford	1966	DB6/SB/2272/LC	400/2792/V	Yes	Unsold at Bonhams' Quail Motorcar Auction in August 2020 with an estimate of US$1,000,000 – 1,200,000.
Harold Radford	1966	DB6/S/2688/L	400/2613	No	Sold at RM Sotheby's Monterey Auction in August 2015 for $682,000 (including buyer's fees).
Harold Radford	1965	DB6/2387/LNK	400/2488/VC	Yes	Unsold at Bonhams' Boca Raton Auction in February 2013 with an estimate of US$575,000 – 625,000.
FLM Panelcraft	1967	DB6/3310/R	400/3386/VC	Yes	Unsold at RM Sotheby's London Auction in August 2012 with an estimate of £325,000 – £375,000.
