= Aston Martin DB12 =

Grand tourer produced by Aston Martin

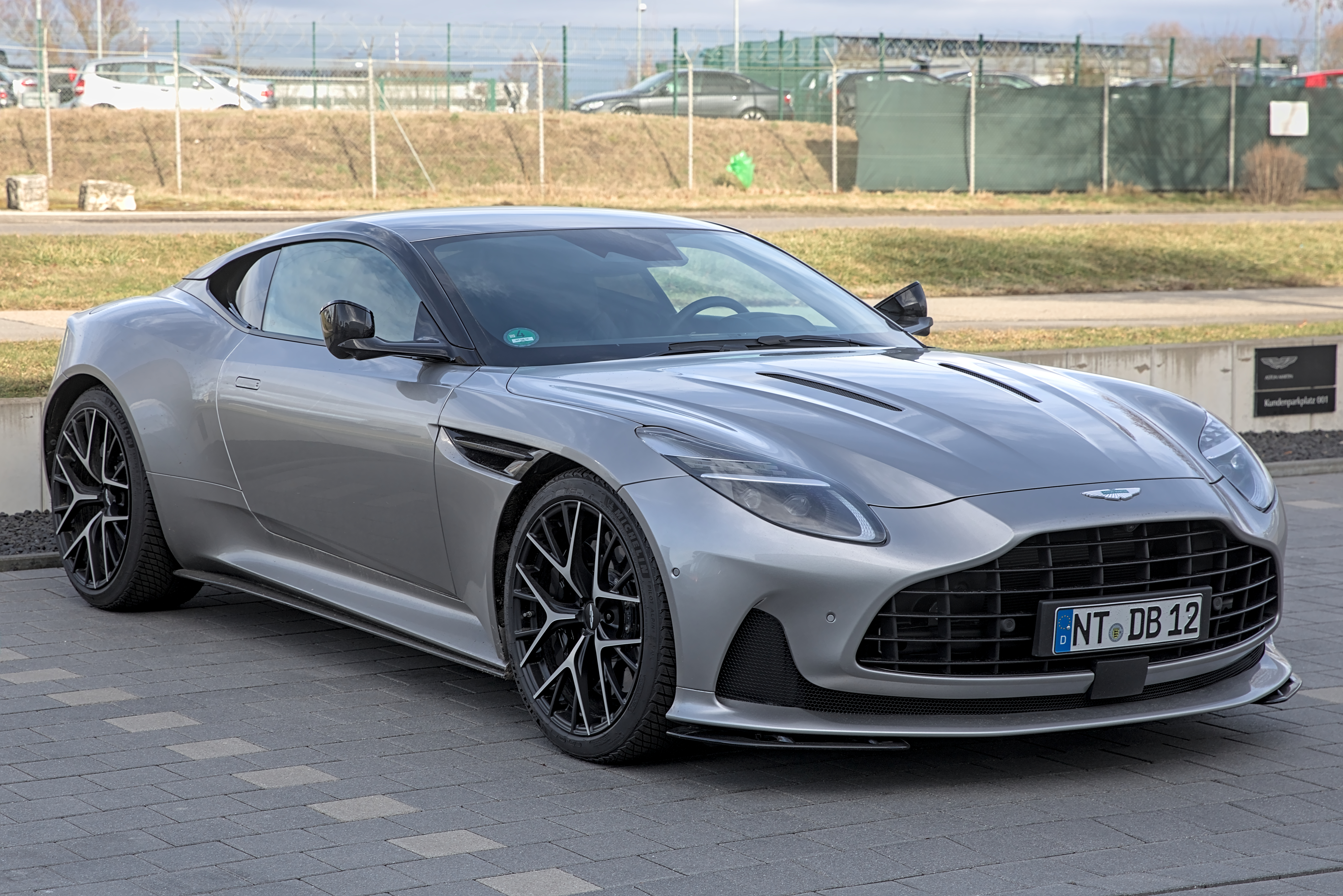

Overview
- Manufacturer: Aston Martin
- Model code: AM572
- Production: 2023–present
- Model years: 2024–present
- Assembly: United Kingdom: Gaydon, Warwickshire
- Designer: Marek Reichman (head of design)

Body and chassis
- Class: Grand tourer (S)
- Body style: 2-door coupé; 2-door convertible
- Layout: Front mid-engine, rear-wheel-drive
- Doors: Swan
- Related: Aston Martin Vantage; Aston Martin Vanquish

Powertrain
- Engine: 4.0 L AE23 twin-turbo V8
- Transmission: 8-speed ZF 8HP75 automatic

Dimensions
- Wheelbase: 2,805 mm (110.4 in)
- Length: 4,725 mm (186.0 in)
- Width: 1,980 mm (78.0 in)
- Height: 1,295 mm (51.0 in)
- Kerb weight: 1,685 kg (3,715 lb) (Coupé); 1,796 kg (3,960 lb) (Volante)

Chronology
- Predecessor: Aston Martin DB11

The Aston Martin DB12 is a grand touring car produced by the British car manufacturer Aston Martin. The car was unveiled in May 2023 as a replacement for the DB11.

== History ==
The DB12 was presented on 24 May 2023 at the 2023 Cannes Film Festival. The DB12 is also the first Aston Martin vehicle to wear the brand's new logo.

== Design ==
The DB12 is a major technological restyling of the DB11 with touches of the DBS. Compared to that, the DB12 has a larger radiator grille, wider track widths and new LED headlights. It also features a redesigned interior and an all-new infotainment system, which can support Android Auto and Apple CarPlay.

== Variants ==
=== DB12 Coupé ===
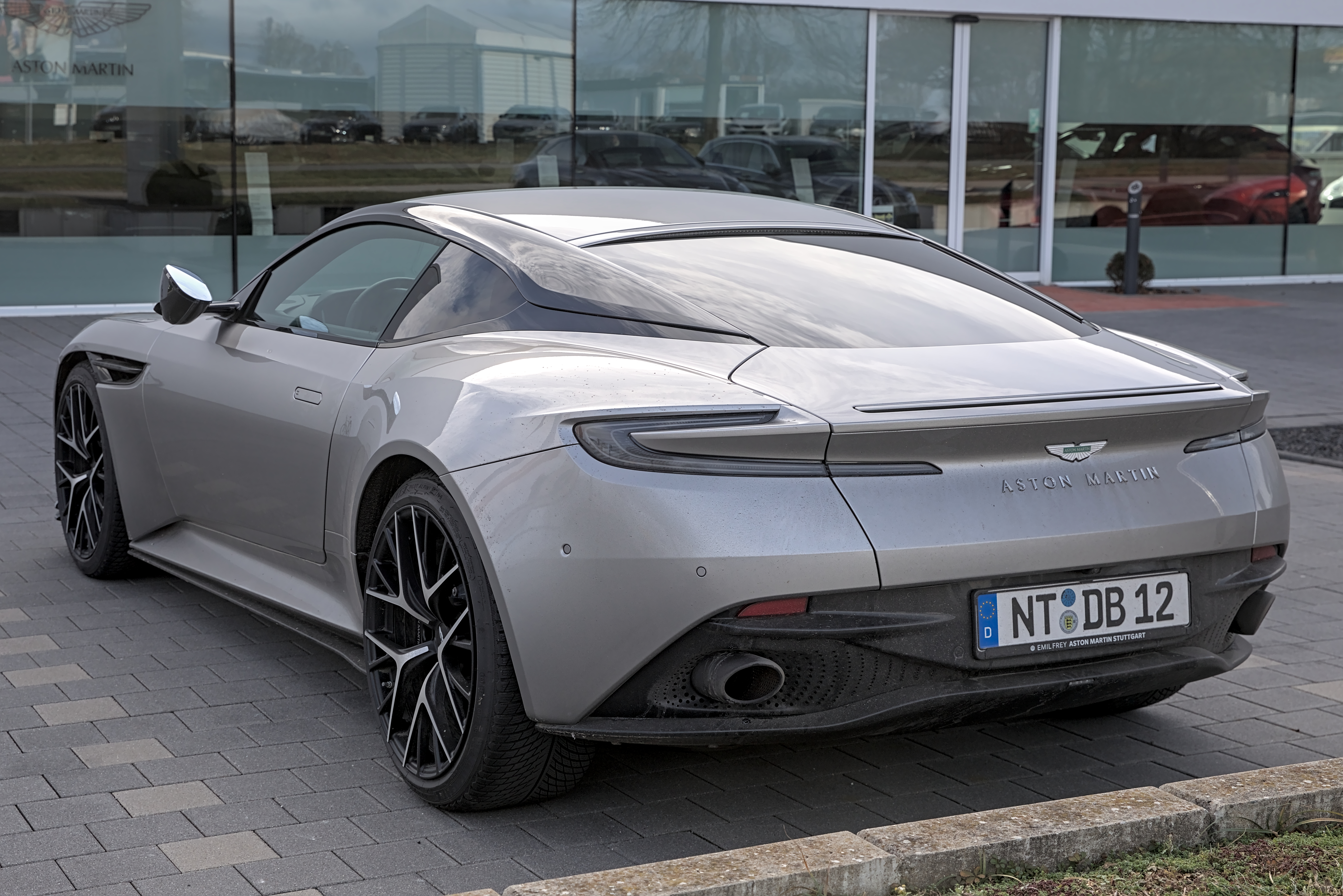
Rear view

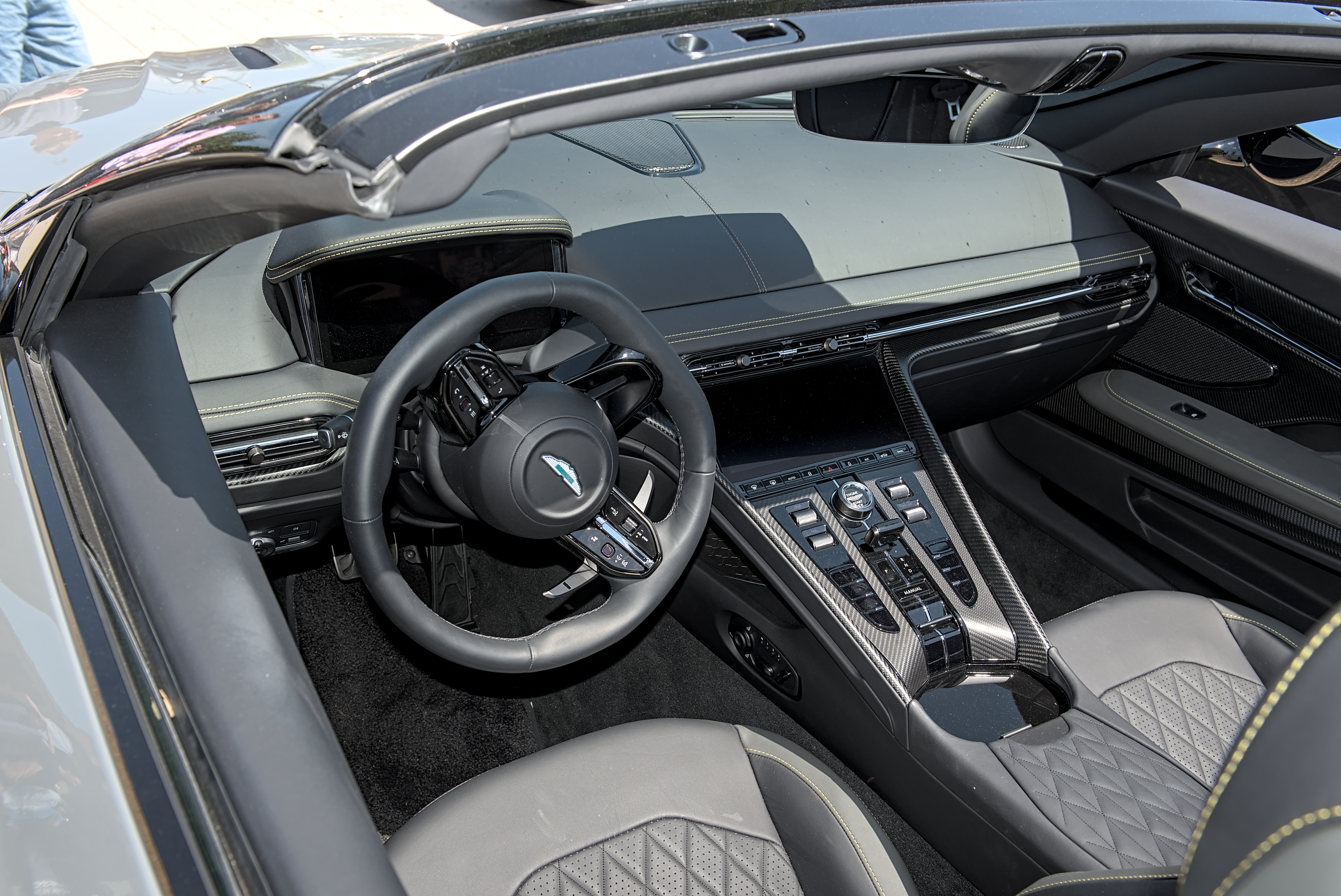
Interior

The DB12 features a 4.0-litre M177 twin-turbo V8 engine with a power output of 680 PS (500 kW; 671 hp) and 800 N⋅m (590 lb⋅ft) of torque. The increase in performance is achieved by optimized compression, larger turbochargers, and improved cooling. The DB12 accelerates from 0–100 km/h (0–62 mph) in 3.6 seconds, and it has a top speed of 202 mph (325 km/h). The 5.2-litre V12 engine from the previous model is no longer offered.

=== DB12 Volante ===
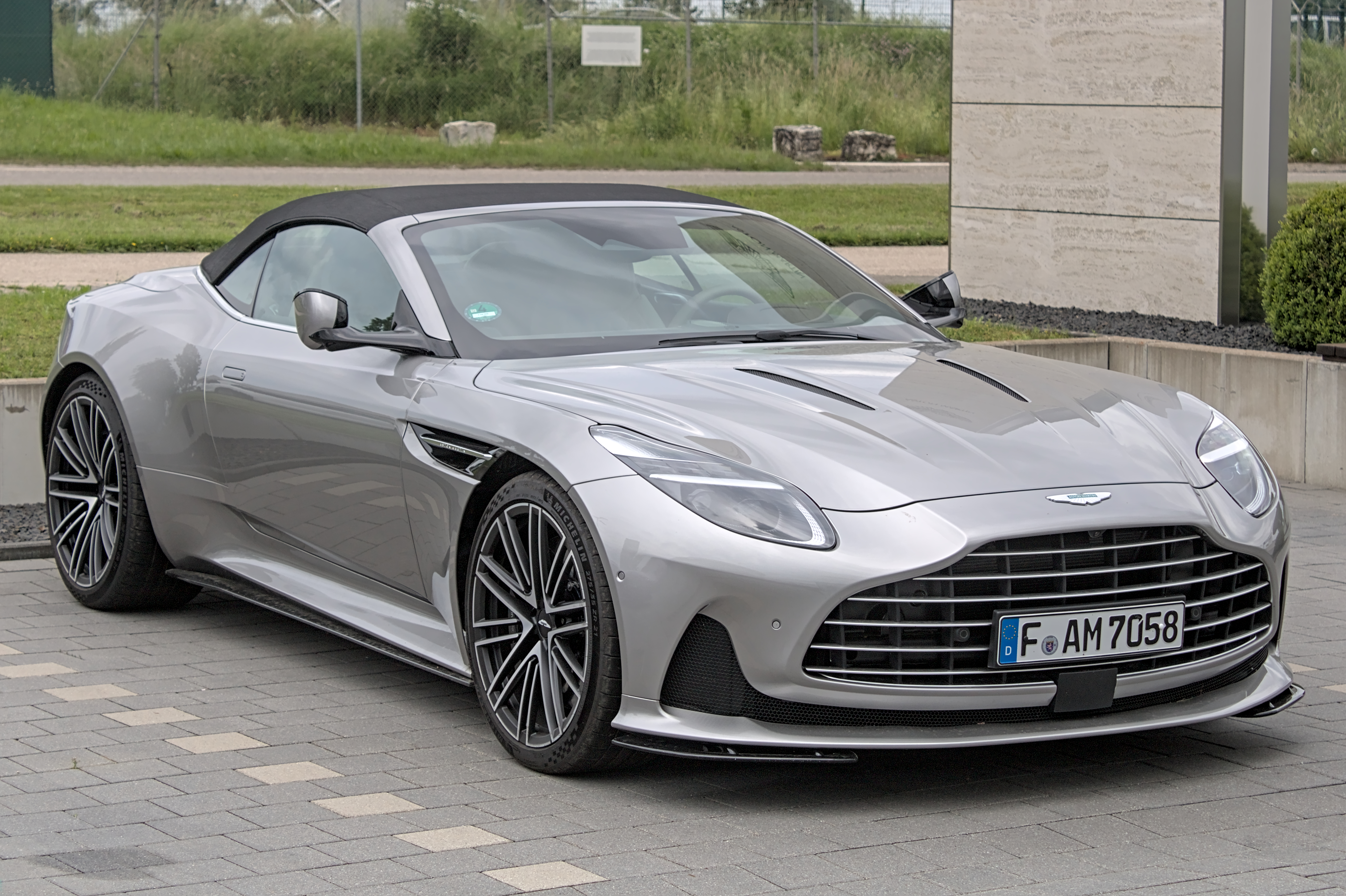
DB12 Volante

Aston Martin unveiled a convertible version of the DB12, the DB12 Volante, on 14 August 2023. The Volante's roof is an eight-layer fabric top that can open in 14 seconds and close in 16 seconds, with this possible at speeds of up to 31 mph (50 km/h). The DB12 Volante is also claimed to have five per cent better torsional rigidity than the DB11 Volante. The DB12 Volante accelerates from 0–100 km/h (0–62 mph) in 3.7 seconds, and has the same top speed as the coupé of 202 mph (325 km/h).

=== DB12 S ===
On 8 October 2025, Aston Martin unveiled a more powerful variant called the DB12 S. It has a higher power output of 700 PS (515 kW; 690 hp) while torque remains unchanged at 800 N⋅m (590 lb⋅ft). The transmission calibration is revised for 50 per cent improvements in shift speed, allowing the DB12 S to accelerate from 0–100 km/h (0–62 mph) in 3.5 seconds for the coupé, and 3.6 seconds for the Volante. The top speed remains unchanged at 202 mph (325 km/h).
