= Aston Martin Vulcan =

Track-only sports car

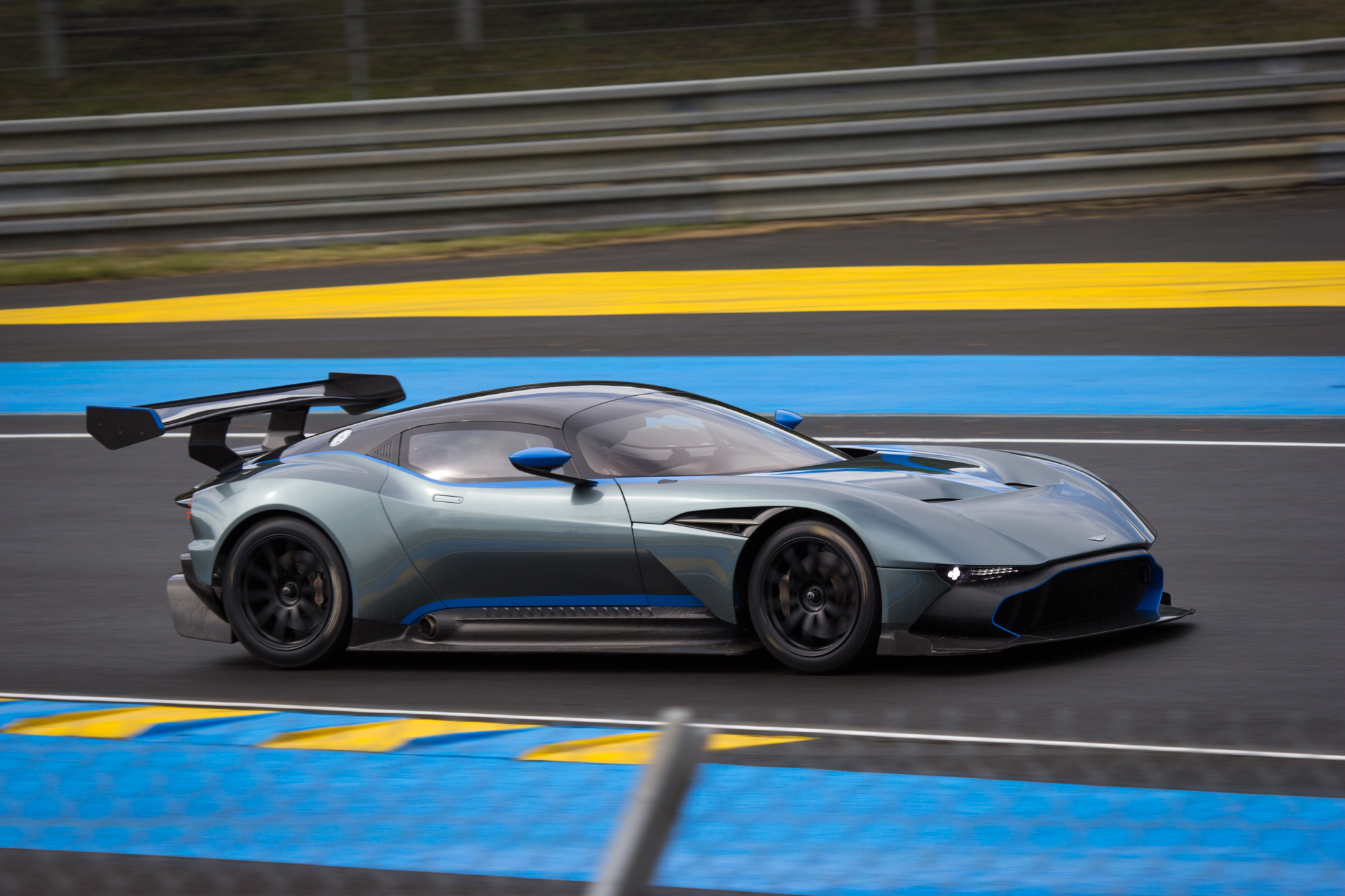

Overview
- Manufacturer: Aston Martin Lagonda Limited
- Production: 2015–2016; 24 units built
- Assembly: United Kingdom: Gaydon, Warwickshire
- Designer: Marek Reichman

Body and chassis
- Class: Track day car (S)
- Body style: 2-door coupé
- Layout: Front mid-engine, rear-wheel-drive
- Doors: Swan
- Related: Aston Martin One-77; Aston Martin Victor

Powertrain
- Engine: 6,949 cubic centimetres (424.1 cu in; 6.949 L) Aston Martin naturally-aspirated V12
- Power output: 831 PS (611 kW; 820 hp) @ 7,750 rpm 780 N⋅m (575 lb⋅ft) @ 6,500 rpm
- Transmission: 6-speed sequential

Dimensions
- Wheelbase: 2,791 mm (110 in)
- Length: 4,807 mm (189 in)
- Width: 2,063 mm (81 in)
- Height: 1,235 mm (49 in)
- Kerb weight: 1,350–1,360 kg (2,976–2,998 lb)

The Aston Martin Vulcan is a two-door, two-seat, high-performance lightweight track-only car launched in 2015 by British luxury automobile manufacturer Aston Martin at the 2015 Geneva Motor Show.

The Vulcan was designed by Aston Martin's creative officer Marek Reichman, taking inspiration from then-current Aston Martin models such as the Vantage, the DB9 and the One-77. Production totaled 24 cars, one for each hour at the 24 Hours of Le Mans, with each priced at US$2.3 million. One was included with the penthouse of Aston Martin Residences tower in Miami.

== Specifications ==
The engine, a 7.0-litre naturally-aspirated V12, mounted in an aluminium alloy chassis with a carbon fibre body, has a power output of 831 PS (611 kW; 820 hp) at 7,750 rpm and 575 lb⋅ft (780 N⋅m) of torque at 6,500 rpm. The top speed (without the wing) is 208 mph (335 km/h) and 0-60 time is 2.9 seconds. The Vulcan is fitted with a magnesium torque tube which has a carbon fibre propeller shaft, a limited-slip differential and an Xtrac 6-speed sequential transmission. The car has a dry kerb weight of 1,350 kg (2,976 lb). It uses Michelin Pilot Sport Cup 2 tires, which are fitted on 19 inch APP-TECH wheels that feature centerlock design. Stopping power is aided courtesy of carbon-ceramic brakes, which measure 380 mm (15 in) at the front, 360 mm (14 in) at the rear, and are produced by Brembo.

Engine power delivery is selectable using a selector knob in the car, with the first option setting the power to 507 PS (373 kW; 500 hp), the second option setting the power to 684 PS (503 kW; 675 hp), and the third and final option allowing the engine to deliver the full 831 PS (611 kW; 820 hp) of power output.

The Vulcan generates GT3-car levels of downforce via its prominent front splitter, rear diffuser and adjustable rear wing. Aston Martin states that the car will produce 324 kg (714 lb) at 100 mph (160 km/h) and 1,362 kg (3,003 lb) at its Vmax speed.

The car has a race-derived pushrod suspension with anti-dive geometry and is complemented by Multimatic’s Dynamic Suspension Spool Valve (DSSV) adjustable dampers and anti-roll bars, front and rear driver-adjustable anti-lock braking, and variable traction control.

Like the Ferrari FXX, 599XX, FXX-K, and the McLaren P1 GTR, the Vulcan must be approved to drive on track day events by the factory. However, unlike those cars, customers can keep the car on their own.

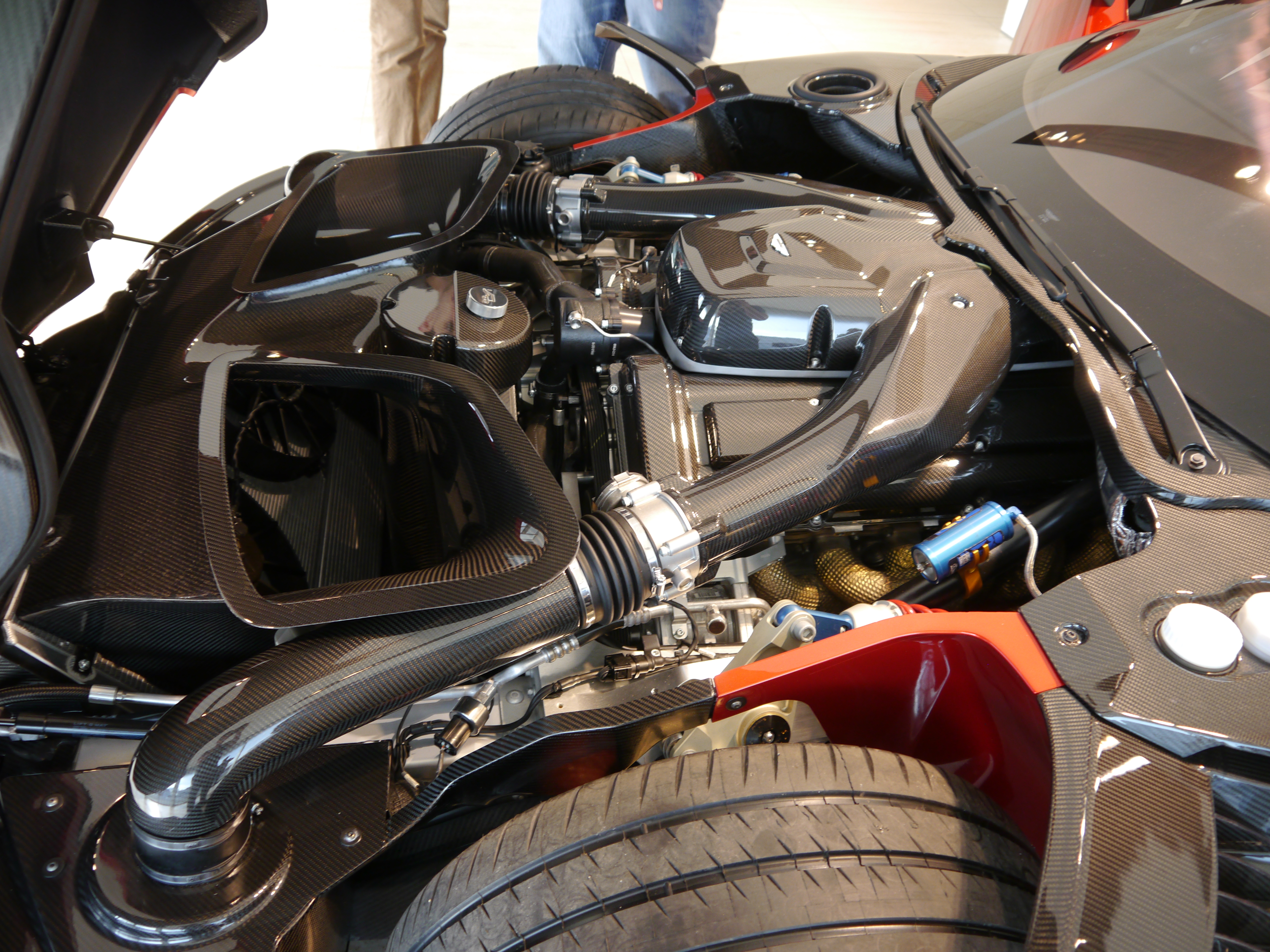
Engine of the Vulcan

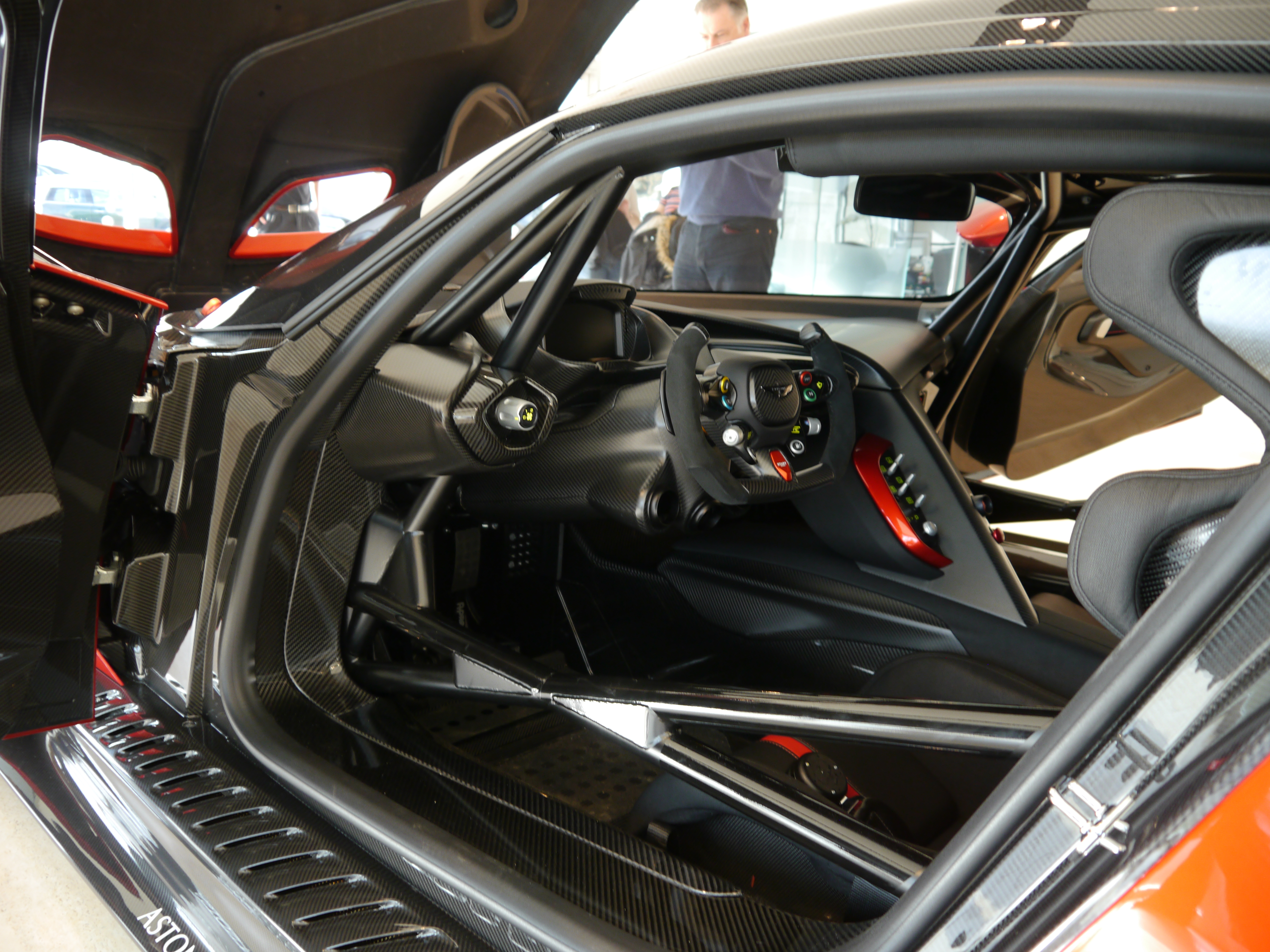
Interior of the Vulcan

== Vulcan AMR Pro package ==
The AMR Pro package for the Vulcan was unveiled at the 2017 Goodwood Festival of Speed. The package contains extra aerodynamic pieces to enhance the performance of the car, with the presence of an enhanced dual-element rear wing with a Gurney flap, large dive planes, side wheel arch louvres, and turning vanes designed to improve steering response. These improvements allow the car's downforce performance to increase by 27%. Balance has been improved as well, with a 47/53 weight distribution, due to the majority of the pressure going towards the centre of the car.

The car still has the same 7.0-litre naturally-aspirated V12 engine as the standard Vulcan, with the power output being unchanged. The 6-speed transmission is also retained unchanged, but shorter final driver ratio is used in order to improve acceleration.

All existing cars can be fitted with the AMR Pro package by the Aston Martin Q division at the owner's request.

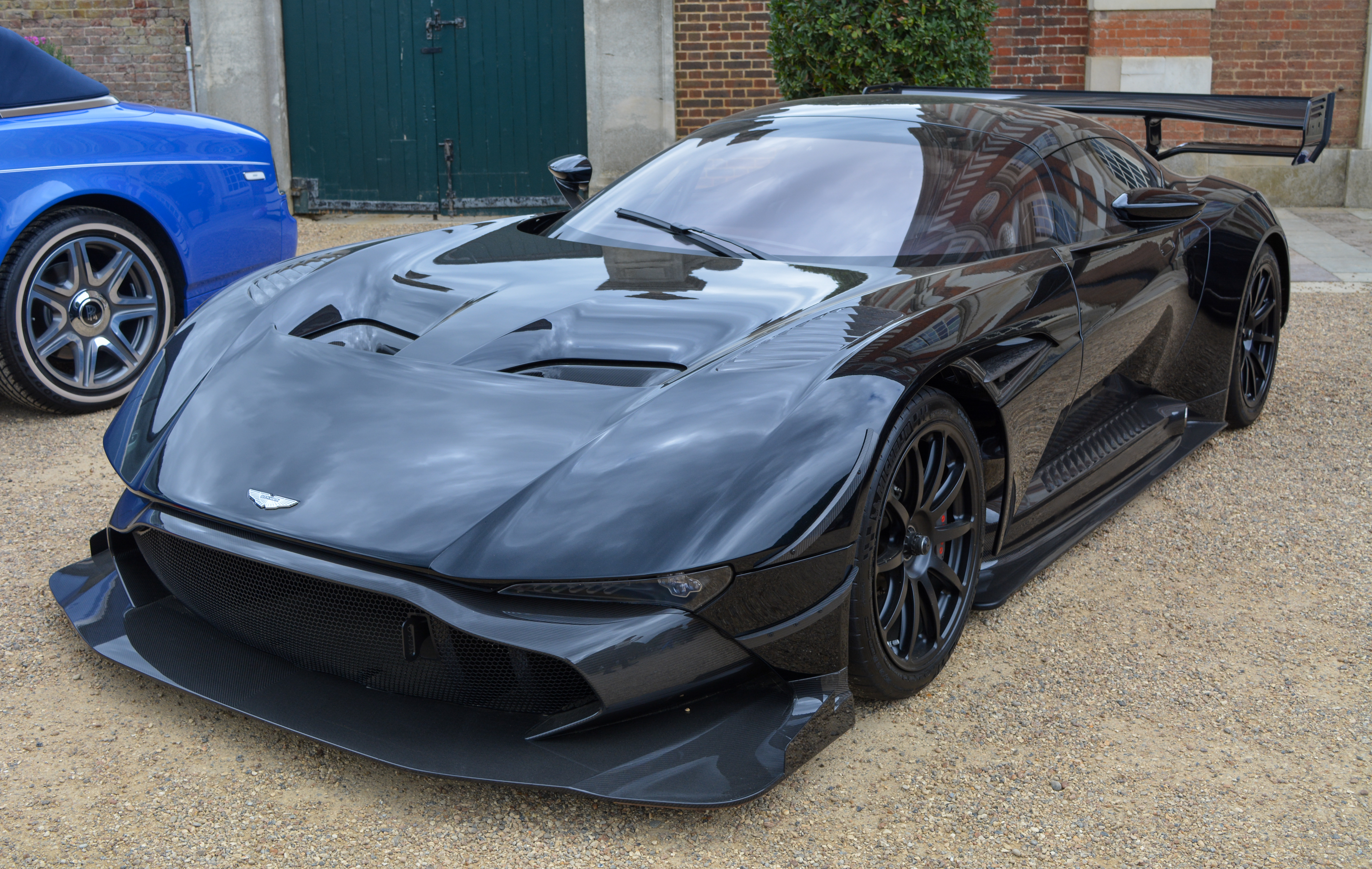
AMR Pro front view

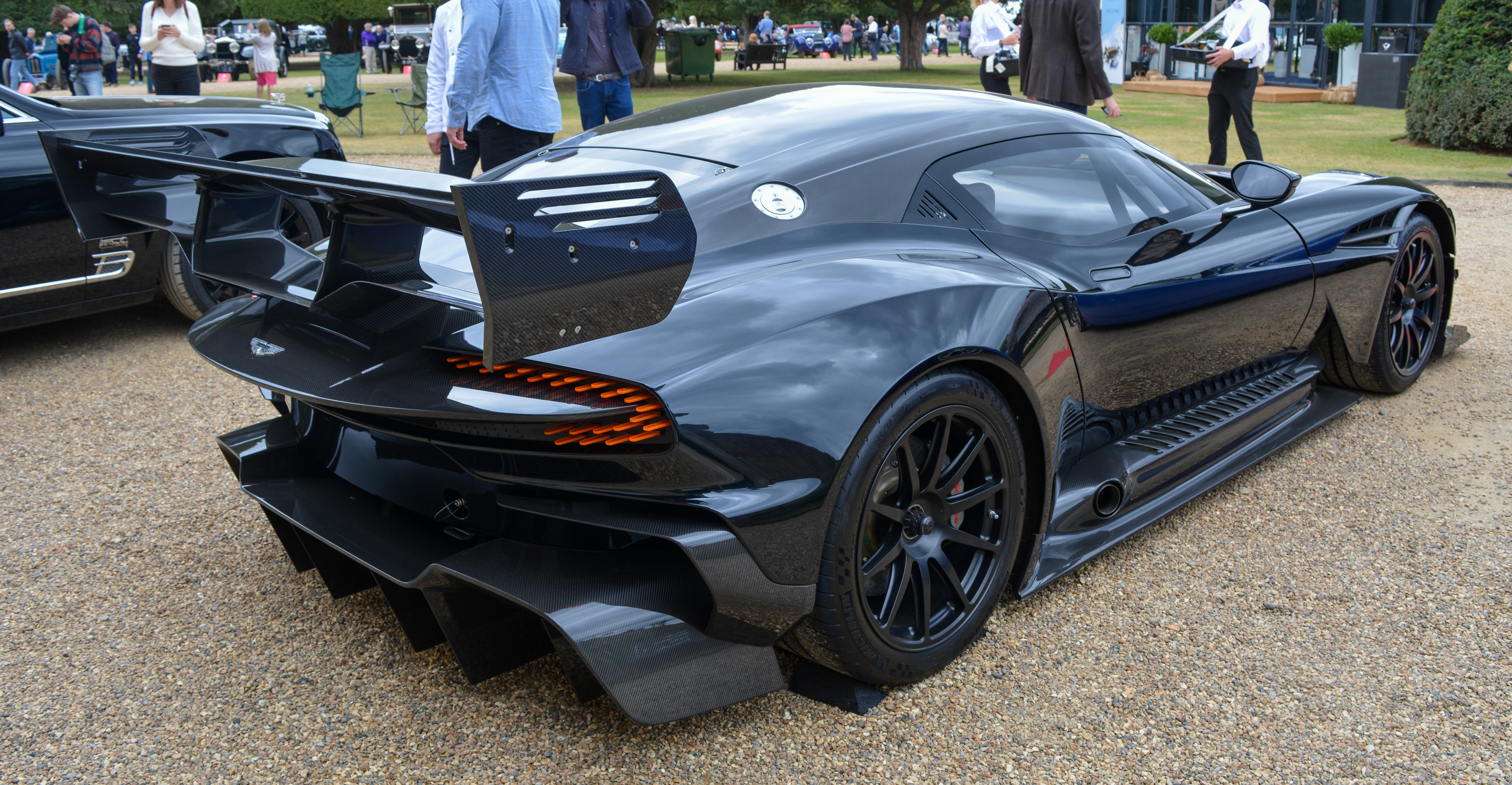
AMR Pro rear view

== Road-legal conversion ==
An Aston Martin Vulcan was made road-legal by British engineering company RML Group through a series of modifications. This car remains the only Vulcan to be made legal for the road. Several changes had to be performed in order to meet road regulations. The group took 18 months to modify the entire car.

The ride height of the car is raised for ground clearance. The rear LED "blades" are covered with a plastic light housing for radius management. Two front integrated headlights have been added, under the inspiration of the modern Aston Martin design. The styling of the lights mimics the factory lights of the Vulcan. As for the front splitter, the car's fences, placed on the side of the aerodynamic piece for more downforce, have been removed, and the length of the carbon fibre splitter has also been shortened.

The 7.0-litre naturally-aspirated V12 is remapped for emissions, and the cooling system is replaced with a different unit for better temperature control although it retains its original power output rating. The car's gear ratios are altered, and the clutch was changed to make the launch easier than the regular Vulcan. Spring rates and damper rates have been changed, and ride height lifting has been added to allow for easier driving on the road. The steering lock became less limited to allow the car to steer more and give a smaller turning radius.

The Vulcan's side mirrors have been replaced in favour of the DB11's mirrors, as the regular Vulcan's mirror glass does not meet road regulations, and it does not include mirror-integrated indicators. All windows have been replaced with specific units that meet road regulations, and a windscreen wiper and washer jets have been added. The rear bumper has been modified to allow for a Euro-spec registration plate to be installed, along with plate lights, and a reflector. The rear wing plates' ends contain an amber light strip for direction indicators, and the fuel cap has been modified. As for the interior, the seats have been changed to allow for visibility, and the steering wheel has been drastically modified. The doors are central locking, and the car contains an immobiliser key.

According to RML, owners of this car can ask the group to revert the car to racing spec whenever the owner desires.

== Motorsport ==
One example of the Vulcan was fielded in the 2022 and 2023 seasons of Britcar, driving in Class A alongside GT3 cars. It previously raced in the 2021 Britcar Endurance Championship as an invitational entry.
