= Aston Martin DBR22 =

Sports car model

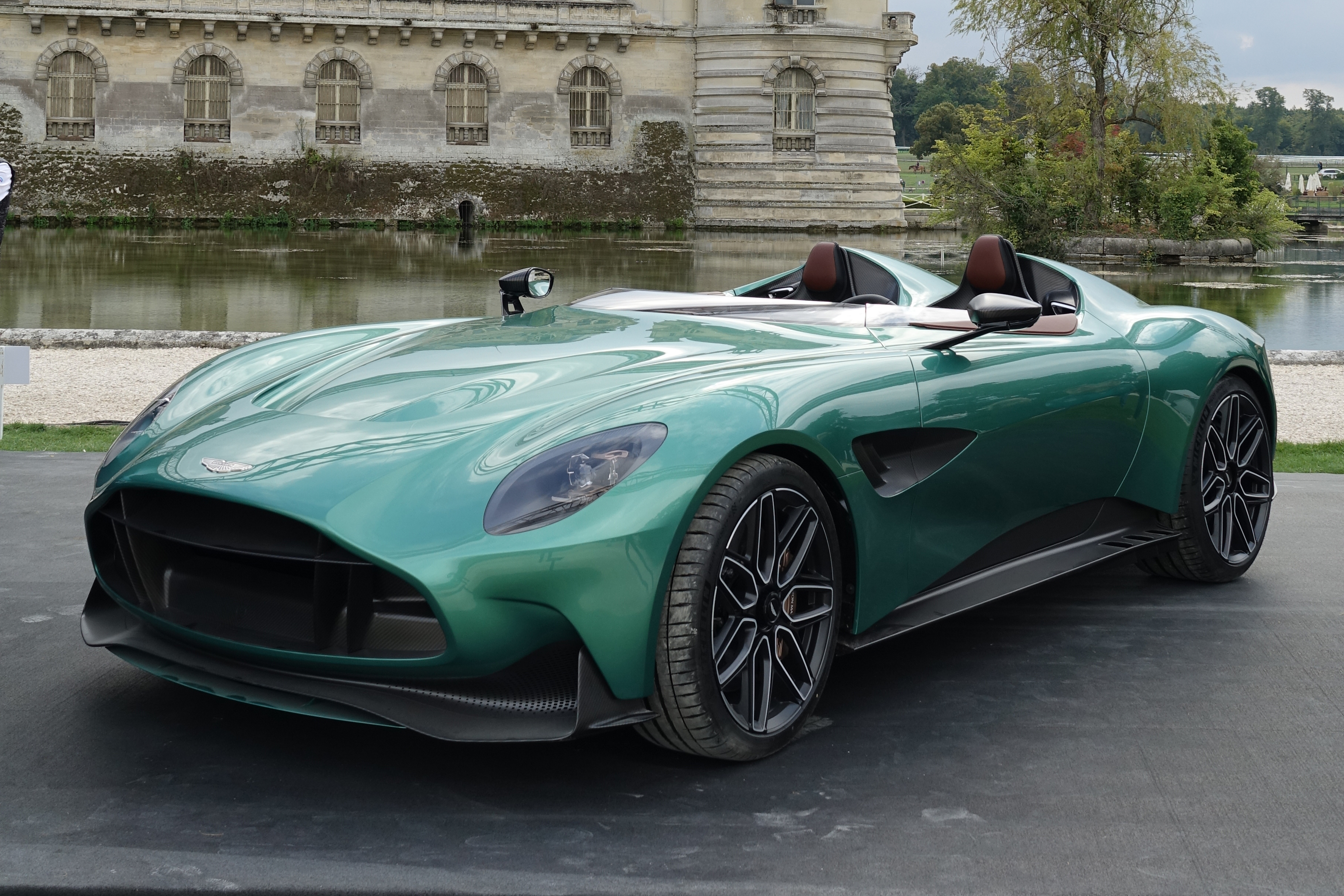

Overview
- Manufacturer: Aston Martin Lagonda plc
- Production: 2022; 22 built
- Assembly: United Kingdom: Gaydon, Warwickshire
- Designer: Marek Reichman

Body and chassis
- Class: Sports car (S)
- Body style: 2-door convertible
- Layout: Front mid-engine, rear-wheel-drive

Powertrain
- Engine: 5.2 L Aston Martin AE31 twin-turbocharged V12
- Transmission: 8-speed ZF 8HP95 automatic

The Aston Martin DBR22 is a sports car developed by the British car manufacturer Aston Martin.

== History ==
The DBR22 was presented at the Pebble Beach Concours d'Elegance on 16 August 2022. It celebrates ten years of the manufacturer's Q personalization department. It is inspired by the Aston Martin DB3S and pays homage to the legendary Aston Martin DBR1 sports racing car, the winner of the 1959 24 Hours of Le Mans.

== Specifications ==
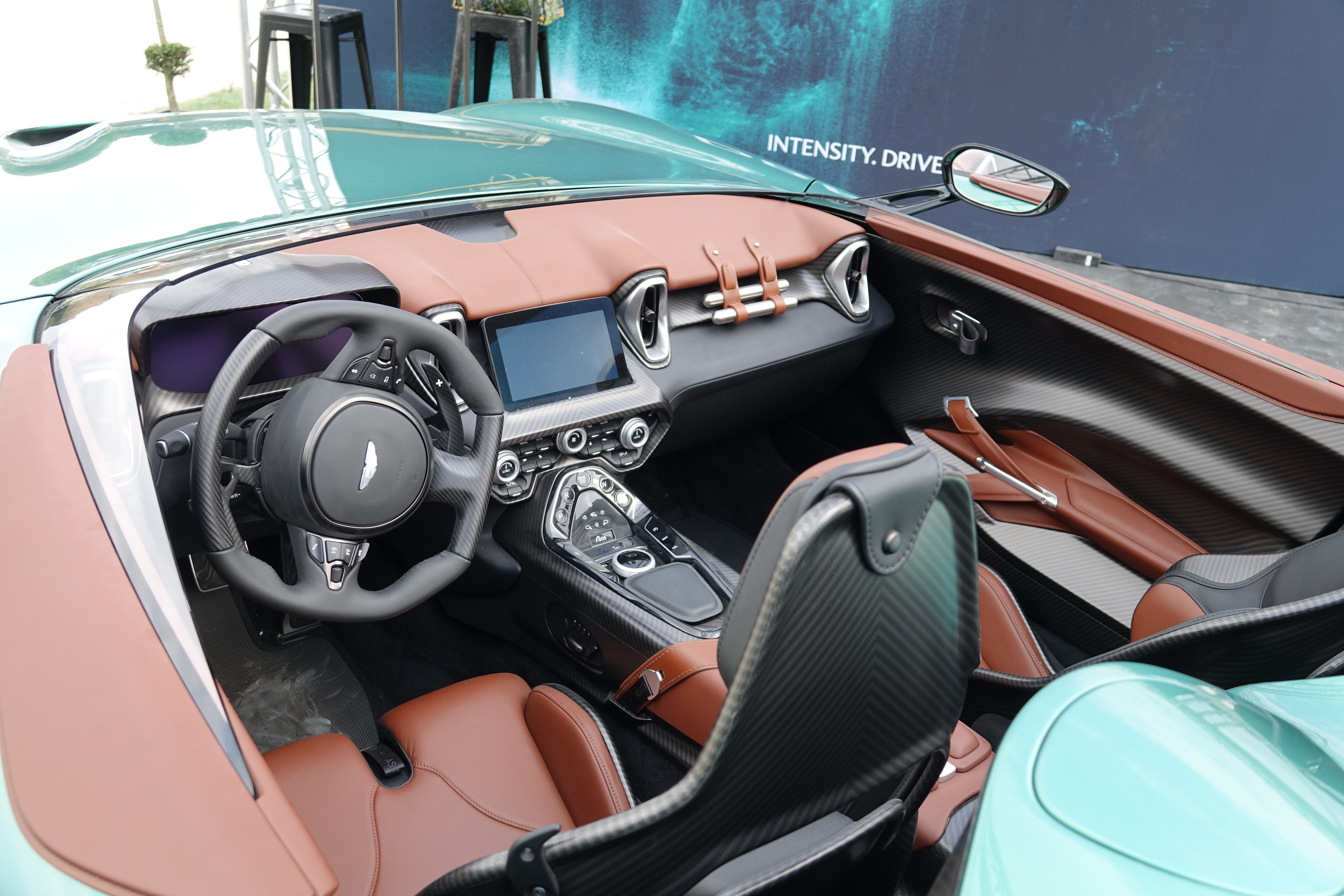
Interior

The DBR22 is a speedster type supercar, which, apart from the open roof, has also been deprived of the windshield, gaining instead built-in headrests of the driver's and passenger's seats, which smoothly connect with the body shape. The aggressive styling features numerous flowing lines and muscular wheel arches, as well as a large front air intake. The details of the car refer to the serial Aston Martin designs, but at the same time it is a completely unique stylistic project created from scratch.

The DBR22 inherits the 5.2-litre V12 engine from the DBS Superleggera and the V12 Speedster and is mated to the ZF8 eight-speed automatic transmission. With that transmission it can accelerate from 0 to 60 mph in 3.5 seconds and reach a top speed of 198 mph (319 km/h). Carbon fibre was used to make the DBR22 structure, while the frame supporting the suspension was created as a result of 3D printers. This technology allowed to significantly reduce the total weight of the car without sacrificing rigidity.

The Aston Martin DBR22 is limited to 22 examples only, hence the name. Each costed £1.5 million before taxes.
