= Mercedes-Benz M176/M177/M178 engine =

Mercedes-Benz M176/M177/M178
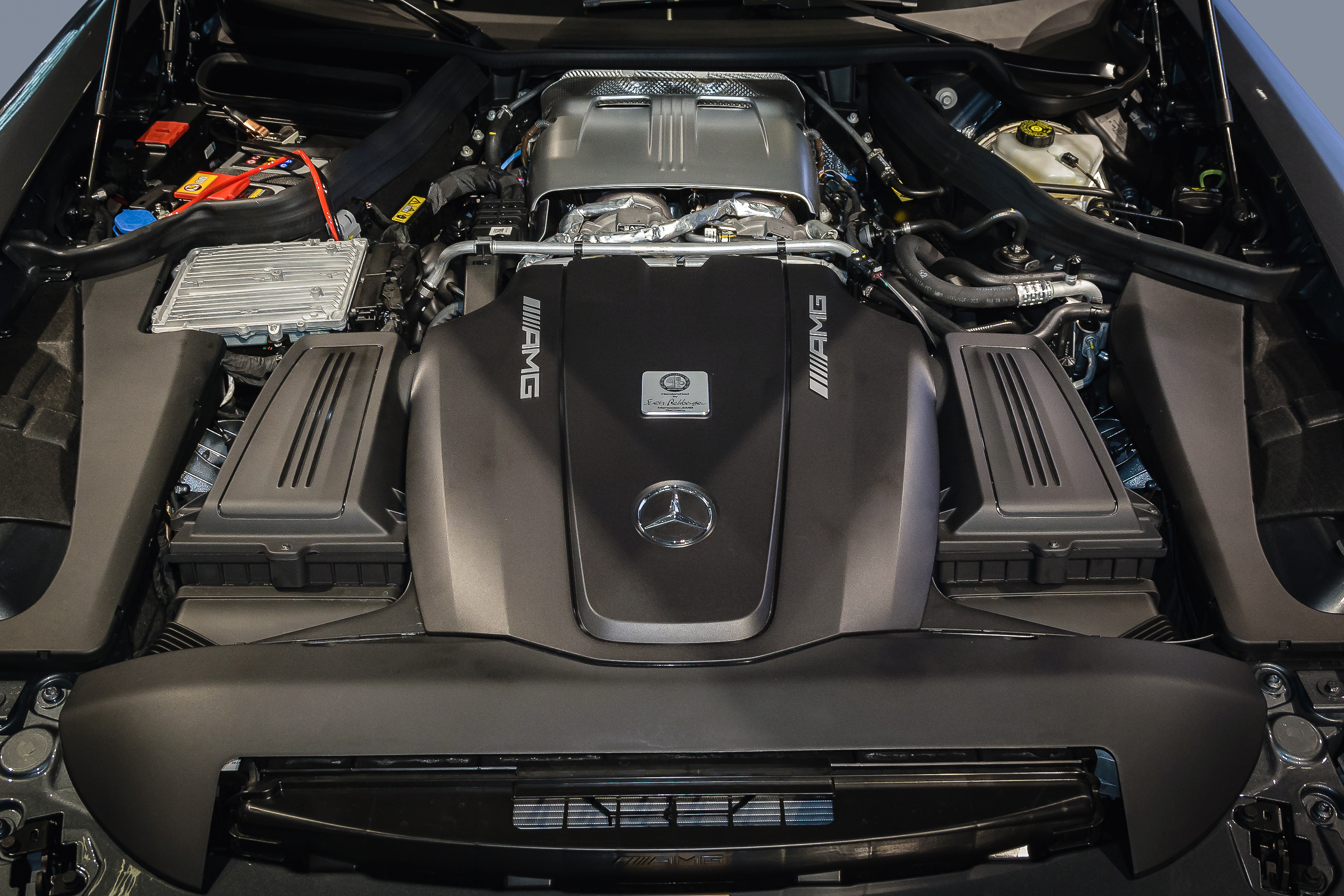

Overview
- Manufacturer: Mercedes-AMG
- Production: 2014–present

Layout
- Configuration: 90° V8
- Displacement: 4.0 L; 243.0 cu in (3,982 cc)
- Cylinder bore: 83 mm (3.27 in)
- Piston stroke: 92 mm (3.62 in)
- Cylinder block material: Cast-aluminium, closed deck
- Valvetrain: DOHC 4 valves x cyl.
- Compression ratio: 10.5:1

RPM range
- Max. engine speed: 7,200 rpm

Combustion
- Supercharger: BorgWarner e-Booster (EQ Boost; 2019—present)
- Turbocharger: BorgWarner twin-turbos
- Fuel system: Direct injection
- Fuel type: Gasoline
- Oil system: M176 and M177: Wet sump; M178: Dry sump
- Cooling system: Water-cooled

Output
- Power output: 340–551.5 kW (462–750 PS; 456–740 hp)
- Torque output: 600–900 N⋅m (443–664 lb⋅ft)

Dimensions
- Dry weight: 209 kg (461 lb)

Chronology
- Predecessor: Mercedes-Benz M278 / M157 engine (4.7 L & 5.5 L); Mercedes-Benz M152 engine Mercedes-Benz M156 engine

The M176/M177/M178 is a petrol V8 engine range designed by Mercedes-AMG, replacing the M278 and M157 engines, and is based on the M133 engine.

The engine has two BorgWarner turbochargers positioned between the two cylinder heads in a "hot-V" configuration. The fuel injection system uses Bosch's new piezo-electric direct fuel injectors that deliver five squirts of fuel per combustion cycle.

The M176 engines are mostly assembled by machine with some components assembled by technicians at Untertürkheim manufacturing center outside Stuttgart. The M177 and M178 are individually assembled by the technicians in "one man, one engine" principle at the AMG manufacturing center in Affalterbach.

== M176 ==
The M176 version debuted in 2015 for the Mercedes-Benz G 500/G 550 and G 500 4x4^{2}. In 2019, M176 was equipped with EQ Boost mild hybrid 48V electrical system, producing additional output 16 kW (22 PS) and 250 N⋅m (184 lb⋅ft) of torque. This mild hybrid system was fitted to GLE 580 4MATIC and GLS 580 4MATIC. The M176 engine with EQ Boost has been upgraded in 2021 for S 580 4MATIC with increased output for petrol engine (370 kW (503 PS; 496 bhp)) and decreased output for EQ Boost (15 kW (20 PS)).

=== Applications ===
Model	Years
Mercedes-Benz G 500/G 550 and G 500 4×4² (W463, first generation)	2015–2018
Mercedes-Benz S 560/S 560 4MATIC (W222/V222)	2017–2020
Mercedes-Maybach S 560/S 560 4MATIC (X222)	2017–2020
Mercedes-Benz S 560 Coupe & Cabrio (C217)	2017–2020
Mercedes-Benz G 500/G 550 (W463, second generation)	2018–2024
Mercedes-Benz GLE 580 4MATIC (W167/V167)	2019–
Mercedes-Benz GLS 580 4MATIC (X167)	2019–
Mercedes-Benz S 580 4MATIC (W223/V223)	2021–
Mercedes-Maybach S 580 4MATIC (without EQ Boost) (Z223)	2021–
BAIC BJ90	2017–

== M177 ==
The M177 was the first variation released in the Mercedes-AMG C63. In contrast to the M178, this version of the engine uses wet-sump lubrication. In the C63 and GLC63 applications, the turbos are single-scrolled, whereas in E63 and S63 are twin-scrolled and different exhaust manifold. The twin-scroll application also features cylinder deactivation.

As part of the agreement with Mercedes-AMG since 2013, Aston Martin installs the M177 engines in the DB11 V8 and DB11 Volante (2017–), Vantage (2018–), DBX (2021–) and DB12 (2023–).

In late 2019, the 48V system used in the M176 was added to the M177 engines for extra performance, improved fuel consumption, and reduced emission output.

In 2026,an updated version of the M177 called the M177 Evo was launched. it uses a flat plane crank and meets euro 7 standards.

=== Applications ===
Model	Years
Mercedes-AMG C 63 and C 63 S (W205)	2015–2021
Mercedes-AMG E 63 4MATIC+ and E 63 S 4MATIC+ (W213)	2016–2022
Mercedes-AMG S 63 Coupe 4MATIC (C217) and S 63 Cabriolet 4MATIC (A217)	2018–2020
Mercedes-AMG S 63 4MATIC and S 63 (W222/V222)	2017–2020
Mercedes-AMG GT 63 4MATIC+, GT 63 S 4MATIC+, and GT 63 S E Performance (X290)	2018–2026
Mercedes-AMG G 63 (W463, second generation)	2019–2024
Mercedes-AMG GLC 63 4MATIC, GLC 63 4MATIC Coupé, GLC 63 S 4MATIC, and GLC 63 S 4MATIC Coupé (X253)	2018–2022
Mercedes-AMG GLE 63 4MATIC+ and 63 S 4MATIC+ (X167) with ISG)	2020–
Mercedes-AMG GLS 63 4MATIC+ (X167) with ISG	2020–
Mercedes-Maybach GLS 600 (X167) with ISG	2020–
Mercedes-AMG SL 55 4MATIC+, SL 63 4MATIC+ (R232)	2022–
Mercedes-AMG S 63 E Performance (W223)	2022–
Mercedes-AMG PureSpeed	2024-
Brabus Rocket 900 "ONE OF TEN" (enlarged to 4.4 L)	2020–
Aston Martin DB11 V8 and DB11 Volante	2017–2023
Aston Martin Vantage V8, Vantage F1 Edition and Vantage AMR 59	2018–
Aston Martin DBX V8 and DBX707	2021–
Aston Martin DB12	2023–

== M178 ==
The M178 is the second variation in the family, geared toward higher performance and motorsport. The 340 and 375 kW (462 and 510 PS; 456 and 503 hp) versions were introduced in Mercedes-AMG GT (C190).

=== Specifications ===
- Cylinder arrangement V8
- Cylinder angle 90°
- Cylinder block alloy Cast aluminum, closed deck
- Cylinder head alloy Cast aluminum, zirconium alloy
- Valves per cylinder 4 (DOHC)
- Variable valve timing Camshaft adjustment on both the inlet and outlet side
- Displacement 3,982 cc (4.0 L; 243.0 cu in)
- Bore x stroke 83 mm × 92 mm (3.27 in × 3.62 in)
- Cylinder spacing 90 mm (3.54 in)
- Compression ratio 10.5:1
- Output 375 kW (510 PS; 503 hp) at 6,250 rpm [Output per liter 94.2 kW (128.1 PS; 126.3 hp)]
- Maximum torque 650 N⋅m (479 lb⋅ft) at 1750 – 4750 rpm [Torque per liter 163.2 N⋅m (120.4 lb⋅ft)]
- Maximum engine speed 7,200 rpm
- Maximum charge pressure 1.2 bar (17 psi)
- Peak engine pressure 130 bar (1,900 psi)
- Air delivery Forced induction, 2x twin scroll turbochargers spinning to 186,000 rpm with electronically controlled blow-off valves
- Fuel delivery Electronically controlled direct petrol injection with spray-guided combustion, fully variable, fuel pressure 100–200 bar (1,500–2,900 psi)
- Coolant delivery 3 phase thermostat, timing chain driven water pump rated 420 litres (110 US gal; 92 imp gal) /min flow
- Oil delivery 9 litres (2.4 US gal; 2.0 imp gal) oil, dry-sump, via two-stage controlled suction pump (250 litres (66 US gal; 55 imp gal) /min), a pressure pump and a 12 litres (3.2 US gal; 2.6 imp gal) external oil tank
- Oil cooling External engine oil cooler in the front
- Charged air cooling Indirect air/water intercooling, cooling 140 °C (284 °F) charged air to 25 °C (77 °F) above outside temperature under full load
- Engine weight (dry) 209 kg (461 lb)
- Emissions standard Euro 6
- NEDC combined consumption Under 10 litres (2.6 US gal; 2.2 imp gal) /100 km (62 mi)

=== Applications ===
Model	Years	Power	Torque
Mercedes-AMG GT (C190)	03/2015–03/2017	340 kW (462 PS; 456 hp) at 6,000 rpm	600 N⋅m (443 lb⋅ft) at 1,600–5,000 rpm
Mercedes-AMG GT (C190)	07/2017–07/2020	350 kW (476 PS; 469 hp) at 6,000 rpm	630 N⋅m (465 lb⋅ft) at 1,700–5,000 rpm
Mercedes-AMG GT S (C190)	03/2015–03/2017	375 kW (510 PS; 503 hp) at 6,250 rpm	650 N⋅m (479 lb⋅ft) at 1,750–4,750 rpm
Mercedes-AMG GT S (C190)	03/2017–07/2020	384 kW (522 PS; 515 hp) at 6,250 rpm	670 N⋅m (494 lb⋅ft) at 1,800–5,000 rpm
Mercedes-AMG GT S (C190)	03/2017–07/2020	390 kW (530 PS; 523 hp) at 5,500–6,750 rpm	670 N⋅m (494 lb⋅ft) at 2,100–5,250 rpm
Mercedes-AMG GT C (C190)	03/2017–09/2022	410 kW (557 PS; 550 hp) at 5,750–6,750 rpm	680 N⋅m (502 lb⋅ft) at 1,900–5,750 rpm
Mercedes-AMG GT R (C190)	03/2017–12/2020	430 kW (585 PS; 577 hp) at 6,250 rpm	700 N⋅m (516 lb⋅ft) at 1,900–5,500 rpm
Mercedes-AMG GT Black Series (C190) (Engine Code M178 LS2)	07/2020–02/2022	537 kW (730 PS; 720 hp) at 6,700–6,900 rpm	800 N⋅m (590 lb⋅ft) at 2,000–6,000 rpm
Mercedes-AMG GT Track Series (C190) (Engine Code M178 LS2)	03/2022-09/2022	540 kW (734 PS; 724 hp) at 6,700–6,900 rpm	850 N⋅m (627 lb⋅ft) at 2,000–6,000 rpm
Aston Martin Valhalla (Engine Code M178 LS2)	2023–	609 kW (828 PS; 817 hp)	

== See also ==
List of Mercedes-Benz engines
