= Aston Martin One-77 =

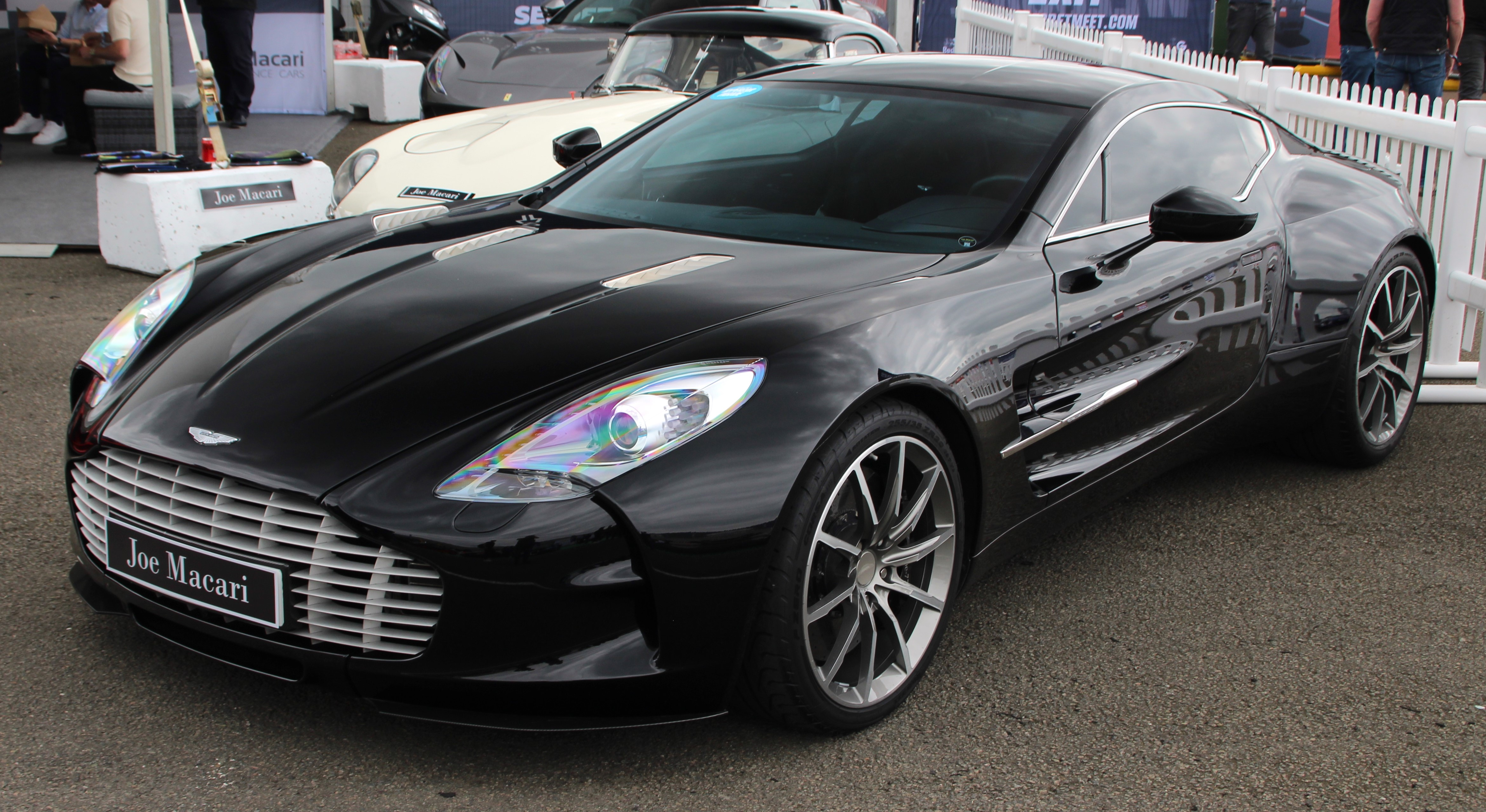

Overview
- Manufacturer: Aston Martin Lagonda Limited
- Production: 2009–2012; 77 produced
- Assembly: United Kingdom: Gaydon, Warwickshire
- Designer: Marek Reichman

Body and chassis
- Class: Sports car (S)
- Body style: 2-door coupé
- Layout: Front mid-engine, rear-wheel-drive
- Platform: Carbon Architecture
- Doors: Swan doors
- Related: Aston Martin Vulcan; Aston Martin Victor

Powertrain
- Engine: 7.3 L AM77 Cosworth V12
- Power output: 559 kW (760 PS; 750 hp); 750 N⋅m (553 lb⋅ft)
- Transmission: 6-speed Graziano automated manual; 6-speed Graziano manual (Victor); 5-speed automatic

Dimensions
- Wheelbase: 2,791 mm (109.9 in)
- Length: 4,601 mm (181.1 in)
- Width: 2,204 mm (86.8 in) (inc mirrors)
- Height: 1,222 mm (48.1 in)
- Kerb weight: 1,630 kg (3,594 lb)

The Aston Martin One-77 is a two-door, two-seater flagship sports car built by the British car manufacturer Aston Martin. The car was first shown at the 2008 Paris Motor Show, although it remained mostly covered by a "Savile Row tailored skirt" throughout the show. It was revealed in full at the 2009 Geneva Motor Show, and deliveries began in 2011.

The production of the One-77 was limited to 77 cars, although several development cars were made for engineering, testing, and marketing. One of the development cars, VIN #10711 was sent back to Aston Martin for complete refurbishment, and now is owned under National Highway Traffic Safety Administration (NHTSA) Show or Display registration in the United States, making the actual total of cars in existence to be 78. The car's development formed part of the name One-77, and sold for £1,150,000. In May 2012, one of the 77 cars was involved in a crash in Hong Kong and was initially written off, but has since been fully rebuilt.

== Specifications ==
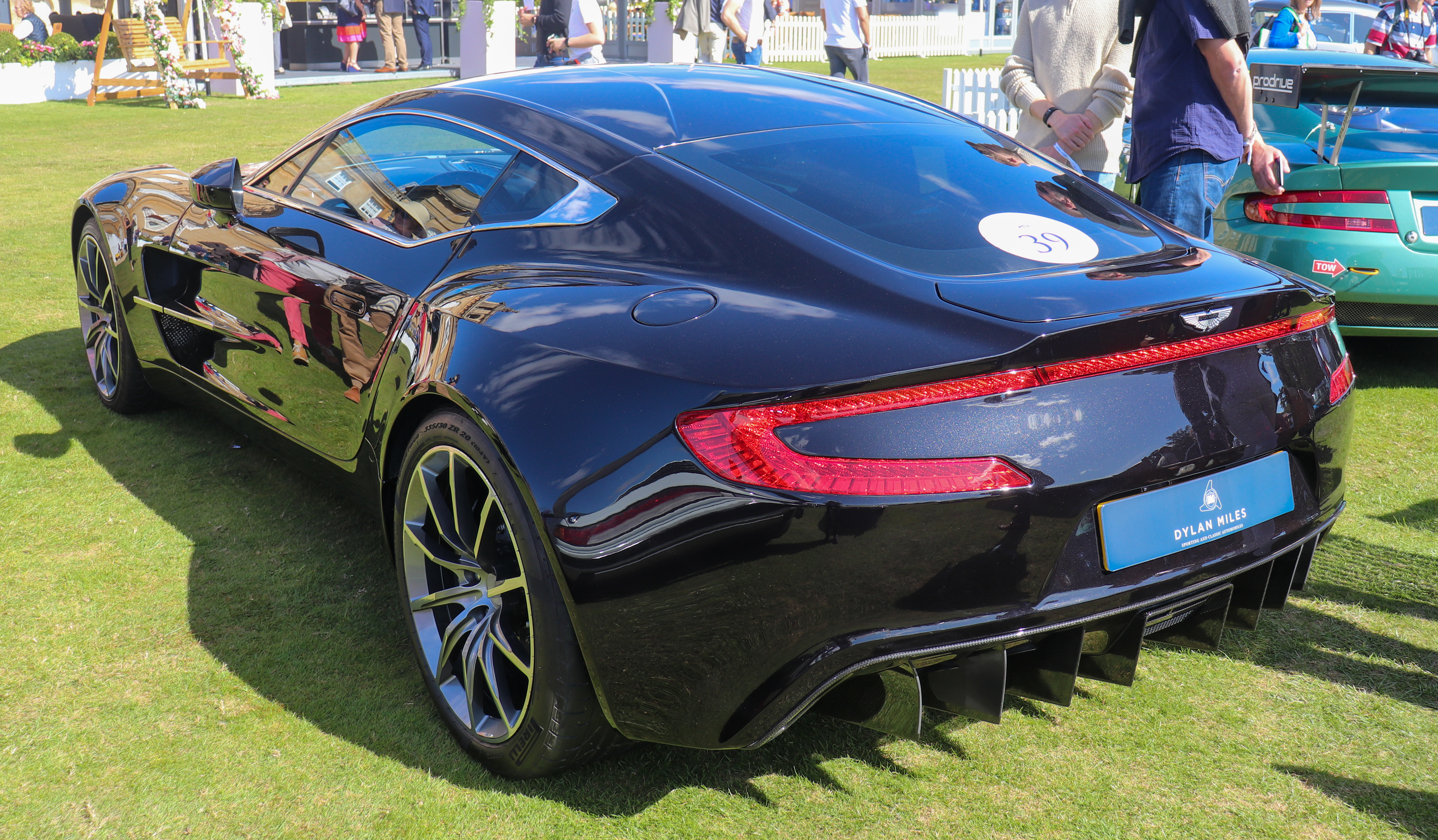
Rear view

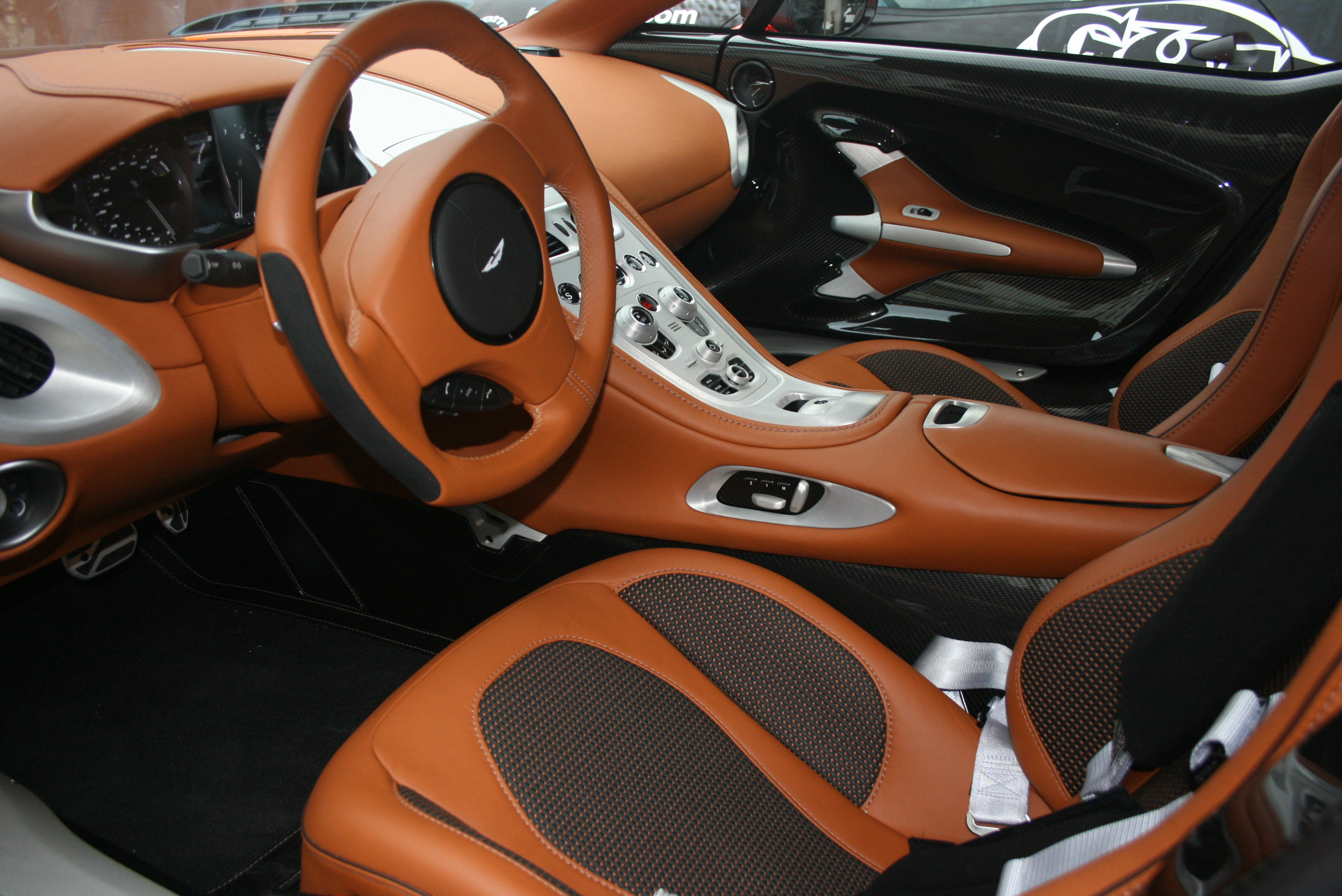
Interior

Prior to the One-77's Paris Motor Show debut, various details about the car were revealed, but official specifications were not fully revealed until the 2009 Geneva Motor Show.

The One-77 features a full carbon fibre monocoque chassis, a handcrafted aluminium body, and a 7.3 L; 446.2 cu in (7,312 cc) DOHC, four valve per cylinder V12 engine with variable valve timing rated at 559 kW (760 PS; 750 hp) at 7,500 rpm and 750 N⋅m (553 lb⋅ft) of torque at 5,000 rpm. Aston Martin claimed the engine to be the most powerful production naturally aspirated engine in the world when the first car was delivered.

The car utilises a 6-speed automated manual transmission from Graziano Trasmissioni and height-adjustable pushrod suspension coupled with dynamic stability control. The One-77 features Pirelli P Zero Corsa tyres (255/35 ZR20 front, 335/30 ZR20 rear) and Carbon Ceramic Matrix brakes.

The top speed was estimated to be 349 km/h (217 mph) but actual tests in December 2009 showed a figure of 354.067 km/h (220.007 mph), with a 0–97 km/h (60 mph) acceleration time of approximately 3.5 seconds.

The engineering and manufacturing of the carbon fibre chassis and suspension system was contracted to Multimatic of Canada. The projected weight was 1,500 kg (3,307 lb), but the production model weighs 1,630 kg (3,594 lb).

== Accolades ==
The Aston Martin One-77 has been awarded with several internationally renowned design awards including the Concorso d’Eleganza Design Award for Concept Cars and Prototypes, the GOOD DESIGN award by The Chicago Athenauem: Museum of Architecture and Design in North America and the "Best Design" award by the UK motoring magazine Auto Express, and many others.

== One-77 "Q-Series" ==
Towards the end of its production, Aston Martin produced a seven-unit, special version of the One-77 called the "Q-Series". The "Q" part of the name comes from the Q by Aston Martin personalisation program. The "series" part of the name is a possible reference to the selection of liveries that appear on each car.

The vehicle liveries are:

- Metallic grey paint, black 10-spoke wheels, red/black two-tone interior, red stripe on the front fascia
- Solid white paint, silver 10-spoke wheels, black interior, red stripe on the front fascia, black wing mirrors
- Solid white paint, silver 12-spoke wheels, red/black two-tone interior, red double stripe along the body
- Black paint, black 10-spoke wheels, red/black two-tone interior, red stripe on the front fascia, dark red wing mirrors

The specifications and performance figures are the same as the regular car. One of these vehicles was on sale in 2012 in Dubai for AED 11 million (US$2.9 million).

== Aston Martin Victor ==
In September 2020, Aston Martin launched its coach-built model based on the One-77, the Aston Martin Victor, designed by Aston Martin Lagonda designer Kaize "Ken" Zheng and unveiled at Hampton Courts Concours 2020 with circular-shaped headlights meant to evoke those of the 1977 Aston Martin V8 Vantage, side exhausts and side bumpers reused from the track-only Vulcan. It has a similar engine as the V12 found in the One-77 but it now makes 836 bhp (623 kW) and 606 lb⋅ft (822 N⋅m) of torque after being revised by Cosworth, and unlike the One-77, it has a manual transmission, which made it the most powerful Aston Martin with a manual transmission at the time.

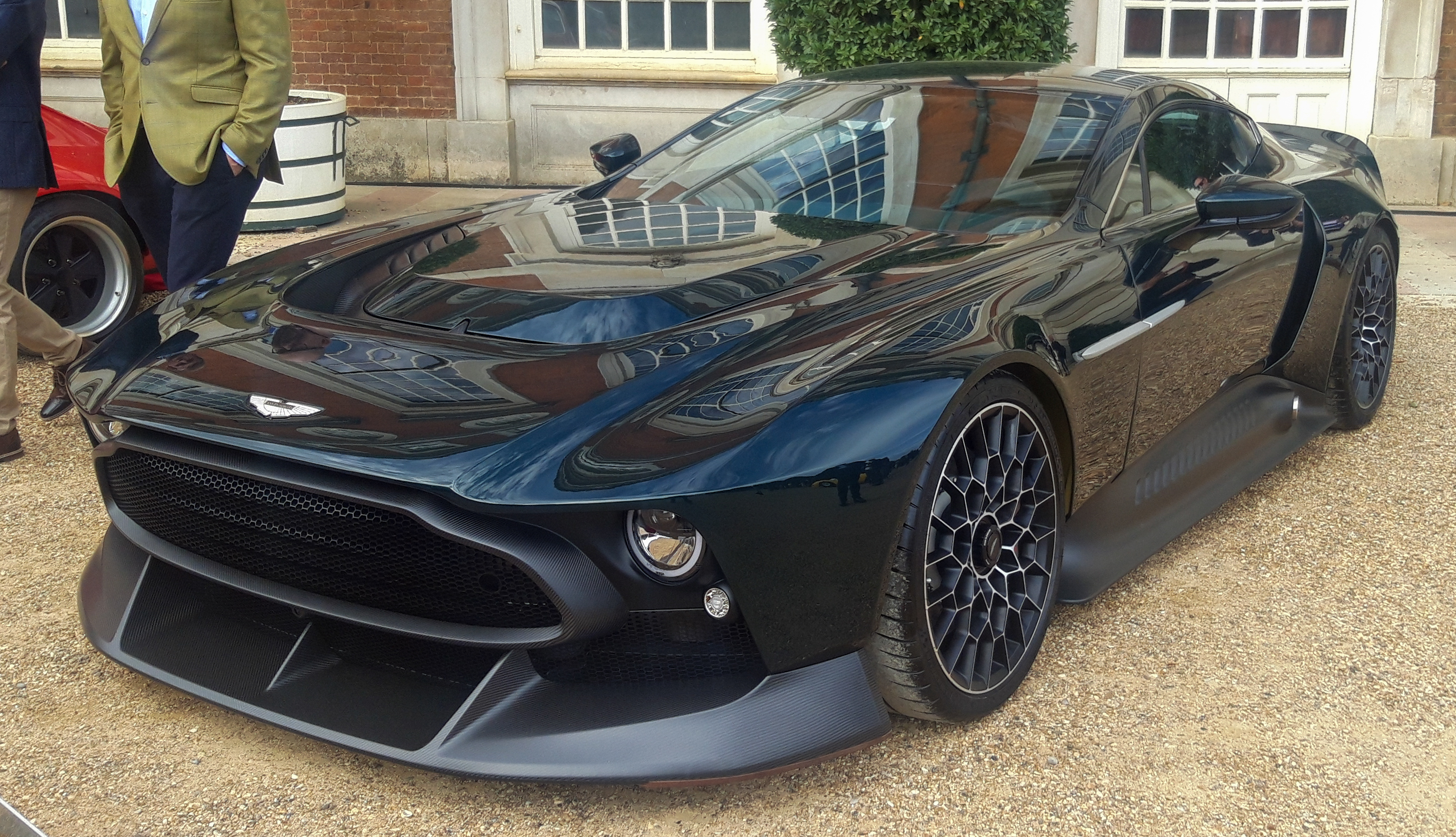
2020 Aston Martin Victor

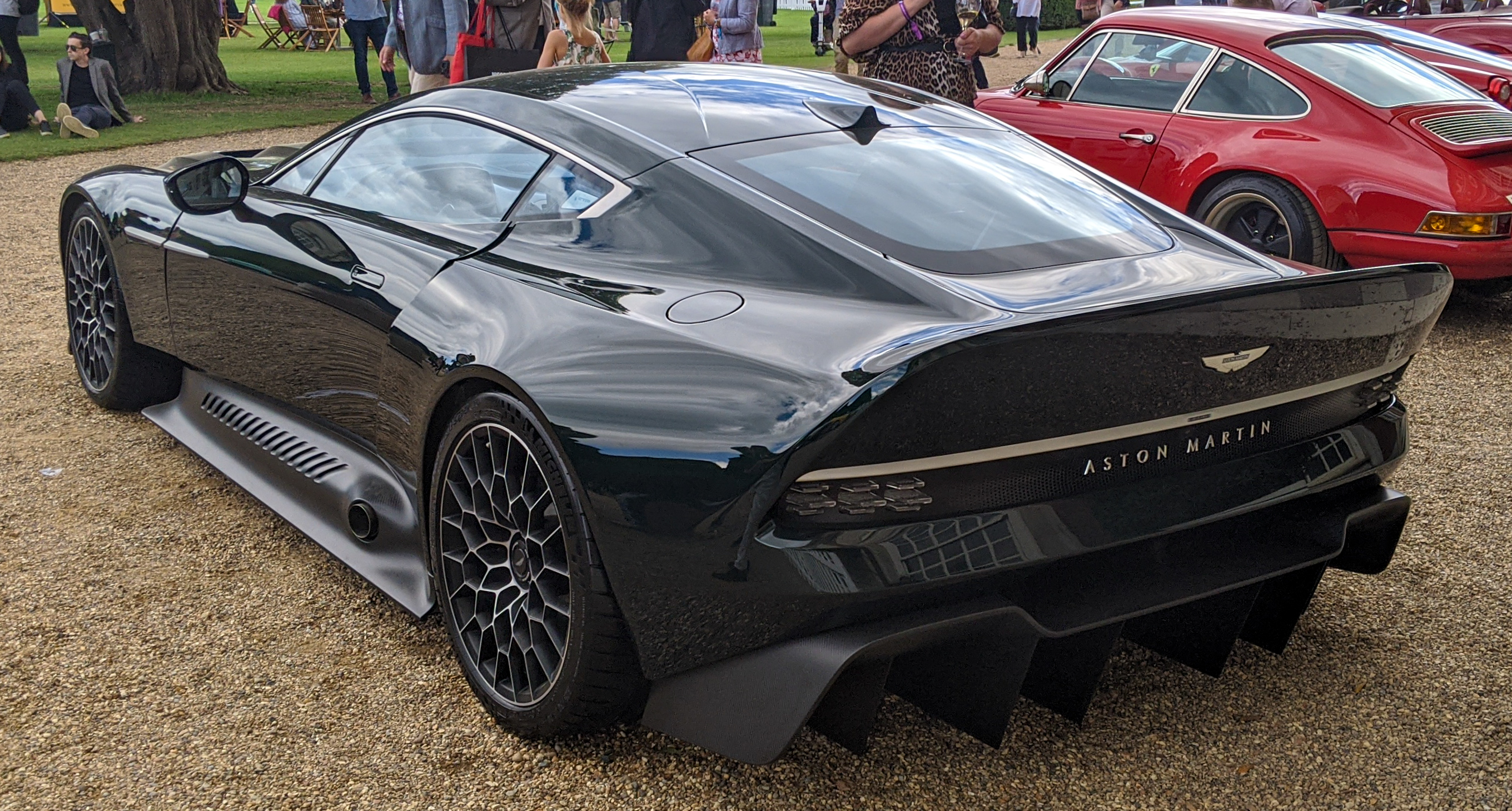
Rear

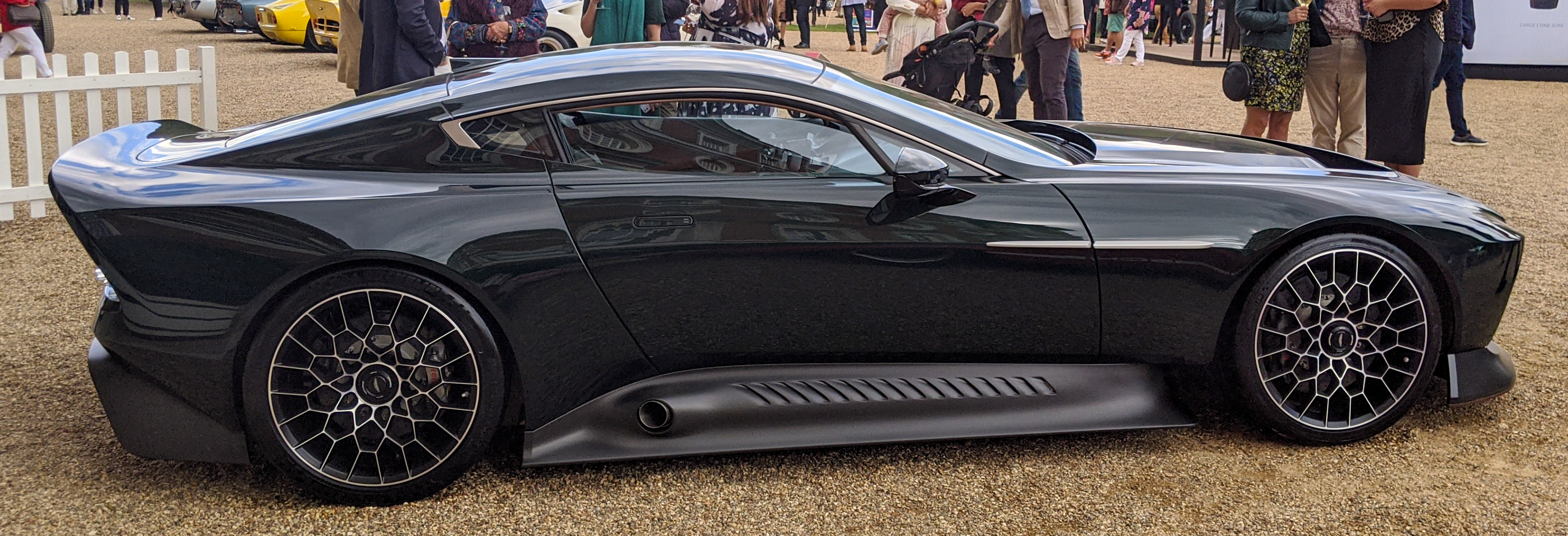
Side profile
