= Aston Martin DB11 =

British grand touring car model launched in 2016

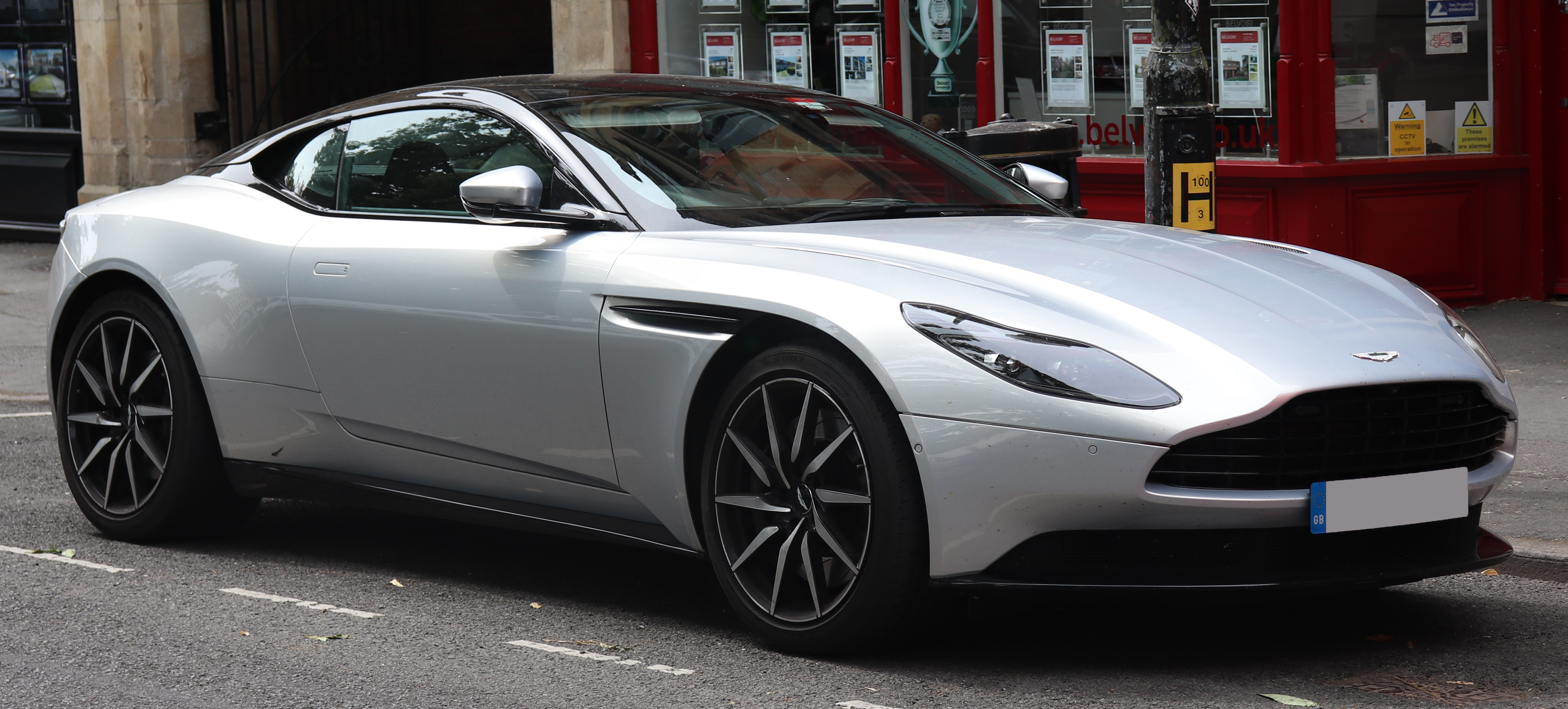

Overview
- Manufacturer: Aston Martin
- Model code: AM5
- Production: September 2016 – June 2023
- Assembly: United Kingdom: Gaydon, Warwickshire
- Designer: Marek Reichman

Body and chassis
- Class: Grand tourer
- Body style: 2-door coupé; 2-door convertible
- Layout: Front mid-engine, rear-wheel-drive
- Doors: Swan
- Related: Aston Martin DBS Superleggera; Aston Martin Vantage

Powertrain
- Engine: 4.0 L Mercedes-AMG M177 twin-turbo V8; 5.2 L AE31 twin-turbo V12
- Transmission: 8-speed ZF 8HP75 automatic

Dimensions
- Wheelbase: 110.4 in (2,804.2 mm)
- Length: 187 in (4,749.8 mm)
- Width: 76.7 in (1,948.2 mm)
- Height: 50.8 in (1,290.3 mm)
- Kerb weight: 1,875 kg (4,134 lb) (V12 coupé); 1,760 kg (3,880 lb) (V8 coupé); 1,870 kg (4,123 lb) (Volante)

Chronology
- Predecessor: Aston Martin DB9
- Successor: Aston Martin DB12

The Aston Martin DB11 is a two-door grand touring car by the British carmaker Aston Martin. It was manufactured as both a coupe and a convertible, the latter known as the Volante. Aston Martin produced the DB11 from 2016 to 2023 when it was replaced by the DB12. The DB11 succeeded the DB9, which the company made between 2004 and 2016. Designed by Marek Reichman, the DB11 debuted at the Geneva Motor Show in March 2016. It is the first model of Aston Martin's "second-century plan", and incorporates aluminium extensively throughout its body, like its predecessor and platform siblings.

Official manufacture of the DB11 began at the Aston Martin facility in Gaydon, Warwickshire, in September 2016. The car was generally well-received by critics. Two engine configurations of the DB11 were available: a 4.0-litre V8-engine model produced by Mercedes-AMG and a 5.2-litre V12-engine model produced by Aston Martin. The Volante version of the DB11 was introduced in October 2017. In 2018, Aston Martin and its racing division replaced the DB11 V12 with the DB11 V12 AMR, which brought an increased engine output. The V8-powered model also received an enhancement in engine performance in 2021.

== History ==
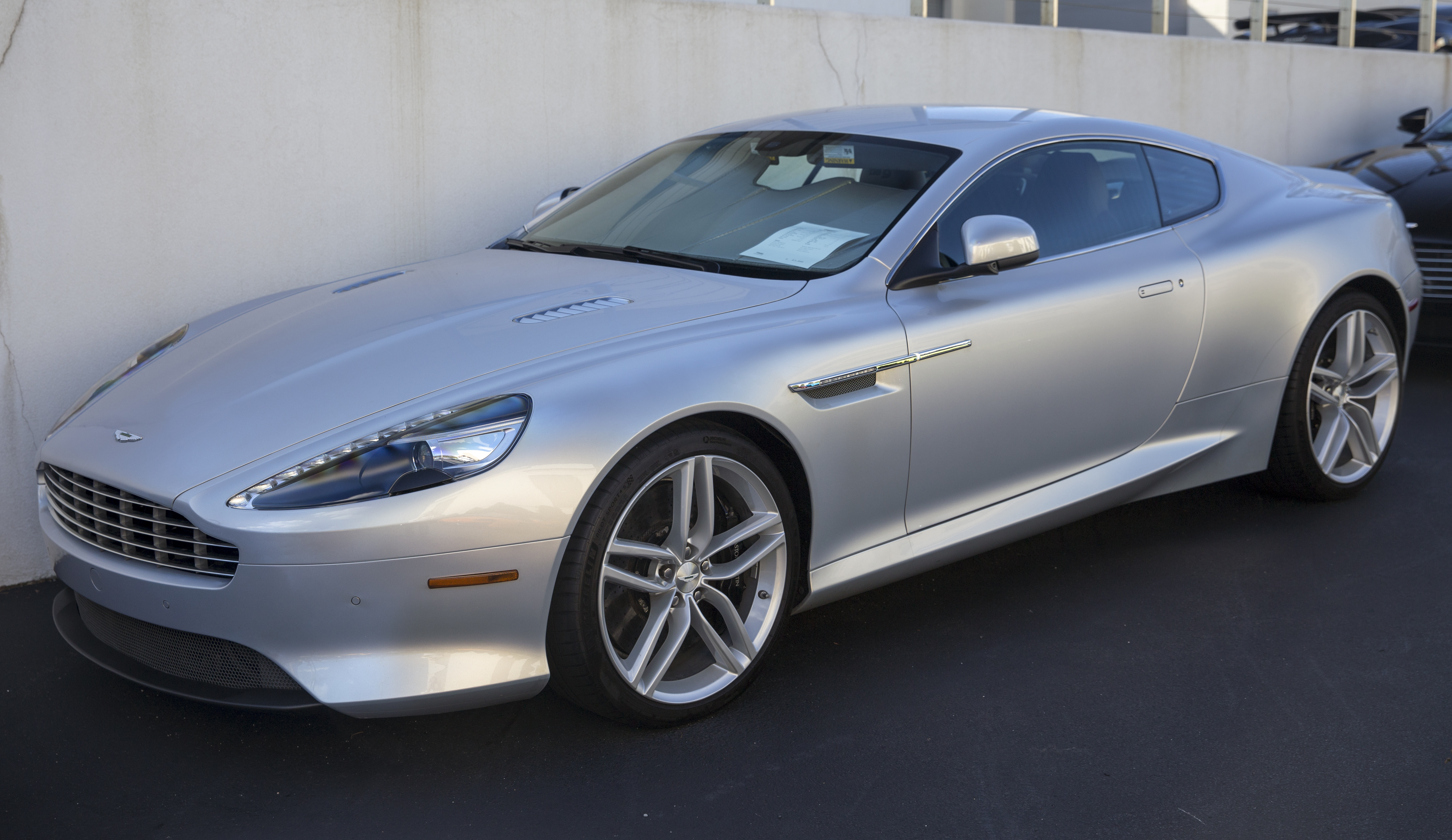
The DB9, which preceded the DB11

The British carmaker Aston Martin began producing the DB9—a grand touring car—in January 2004 at its facility in Gaydon, Warwickshire. It was the first car built on the vertical–horizontal platform—a design in which all vehicles that used it extensively incorporated aluminium throughout their construction. This platform formed the basis of the Vantage in 2005, the DBS in 2007, the Rapide in 2010, the Vanquish in 2012 and the Lagonda Taraf in 2014.

In 2015, Aston Martin announced that the DB9's successor would be named the "DB11". An upcoming series of vehicles, known as the "second-century plan", included the DB11 and was to introduce a refreshed design approach directed by Marek Reichman, whom Aston Martin had appointed lead designer in May 2005. Insider reports indicated that this model range aimed to address critiques of the existing lineup by emphasising distinctive differences between the models, aligning them more closely with the prominent Italian luxury automobile manufacturer Ferrari.

Manufacture of the DB9 officially ended in July 2016, after a twelve-year production run during which 16,500 units had been made. The DB11 debuted at the Geneva Motor Show in March 2016. Official manufacture of the DB11 began on 28 September 2016 at Aston Martin's facility in Gaydon. To demonstrate his commitment to quality, Aston Martin's then-CEO, Andy Palmer, personally inspected the first 1,000 cars. The Gaydon facility produced the DB11 until it was discontinued at the end of June 2023. The model was replaced by the DB12, which was unveiled at the 2023 Cannes Film Festival in May.

== Design ==
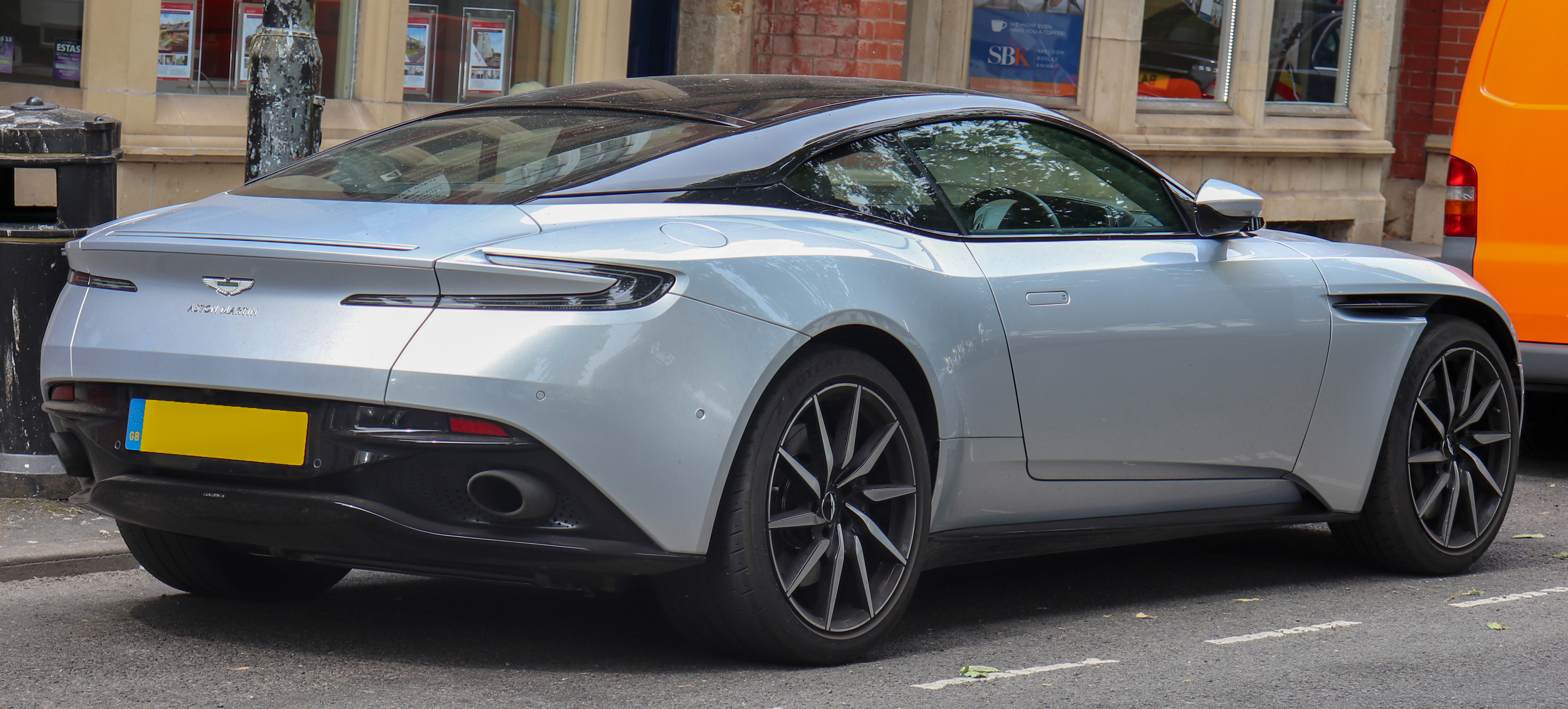
Rear view

Similar to its predecessor, the DB11 is based upon a platform—which it shares with the 2018 model Vantage and the DBS Superleggera—that extensively incorporates aluminium throughout its construction. The chassis, in comparison to the DB9, is lighter and stiffer. Its body panels are made of both aluminium and composite materials, and the bonnet is a single-piece unit. Together, the car's flat underbody, rear diffuser and sizeable front splitter manage airflow beneath the DB11, minimising lift. The DB11 features an AeroBlade that captures high-speed air at the C-pillars and channels it through ducts under the bodywork, exiting through slots in the boot lid. This system mimics the effects of a large rear spoiler, reducing drag without added bodywork. An extendable active spoiler enhances the AeroBlade's efficiency at high speeds.

The DB11 has been described as both a sports car and a grand tourer. It is a two-door coupe that was available only in a four-passenger seating configuration. The DB11 has a rear-wheel drive layout with a front-mid-engine placement and exclusively uses a rear-mounted, eight-speed automatic transmission made by the technology manufacturing company ZF Friedrichshafen. Each DB11 was handcrafted, involving approximately 600 engineers and taking around 250 hours to complete. The DB11 features anti-roll bars and double wishbone suspension supported by coil springs. There are three different drive modes available for both the drivetrain and chassis: normal—suitable for daily driving; sport—offering enhanced precision; and Sport+—intensifying the characteristics of the sport mode. The DB11 has a weight distribution of 51 per cent at the front and 49 per cent at the rear. According to the magazine Motor Trend, the DB11 has a combined fuel economy figure of 14 litres per 100 kilometres (20 mpg_{‑imp}; 17 mpg_{‑US}). According to Auto Express, the car has a CO_{2} emission rating of 270 grams per kilometre (15 oz/mi).

The doors of the DB11, like the DB9, are swan-hinged. (Note: Swan-hinged doors are a type of vehicle door with an outward and slightly upward opening style. They are essentially standard doors, but they are mounted on a slightly tilted axis to enhance ground clearance.) The infotainment system operates on an 8 in (200 mm) liquid-crystal display accessed via a rotary controller or an optional touchpad. Each DB11 comes with a 400-watt audio system, USB playback, SiriusXM satellite radio, and a Wi-Fi hotspot with iPhone integration. Upgrades were available for a 700-watt sound system or a 1,000-watt Bang & Olufsen unit. The DB11 has a boot capacity of 270 litres (9.5 cu ft).

== Variants ==
=== DB11 V12 ===
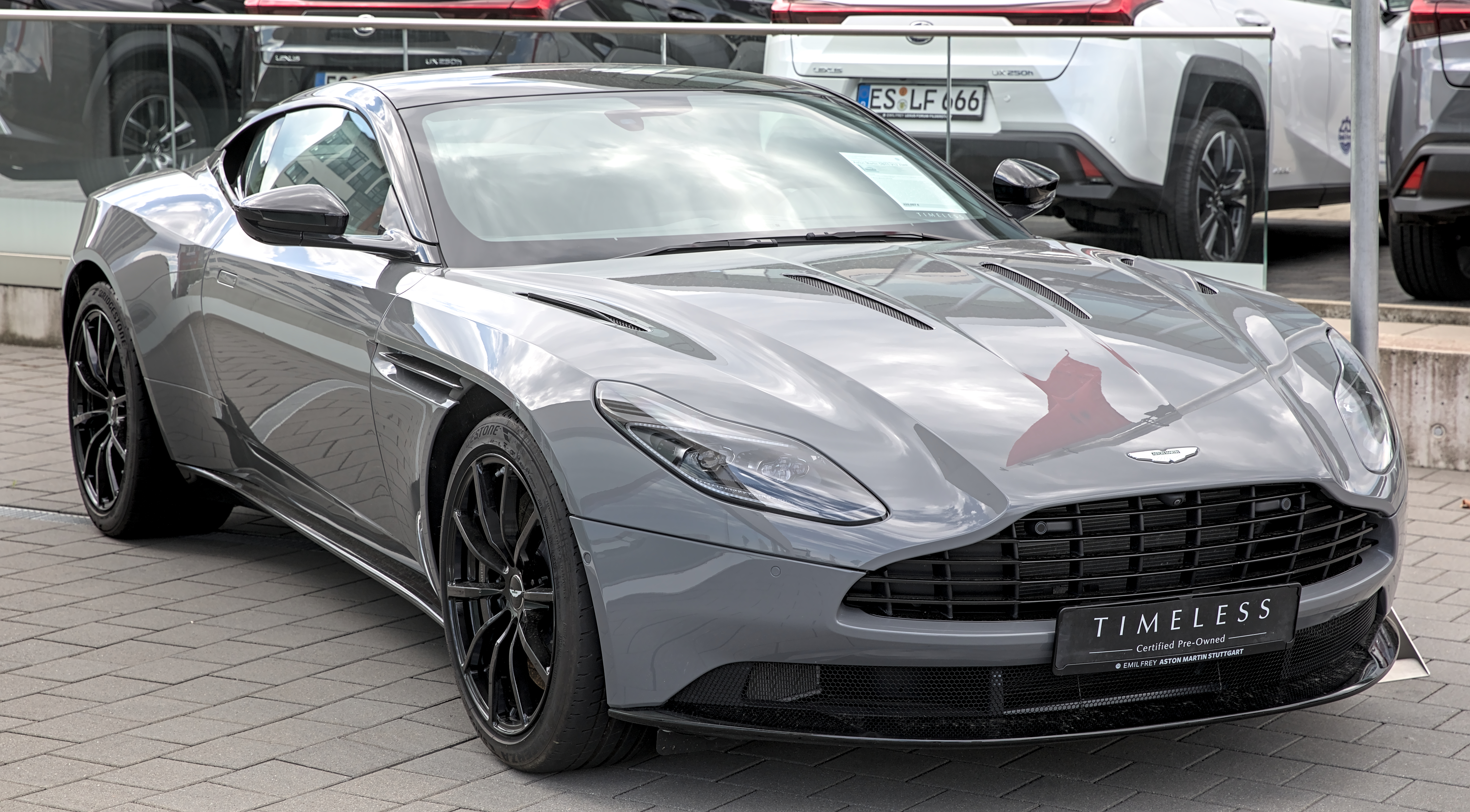
Aston Martin DB11 AMR

The AE31 twin-turbocharged V12 engine, with a 5,204 cc (5.2 L; 317.6 cu in) displacement, was featured in the initial version of the DB11. It produces a power output of 447 kW (600 hp; 608 PS) at 6,500 revolutions per minute (rpm) and a torque output of 700 N⋅m (516 lb⋅ft) between 1,500–5,000 rpm, sufficient to give the car a zero to 97 km/h (60 mph) acceleration of 3.6 seconds and a maximum speed of 320 kilometres per hour (200 mph). Aston Martin began the development of the V12 engine in the summer of 2012 under the leadership of Brian Fitzsimons. The project progressed quickly; initial test firing began in October 2012, and it received approval for production in January 2013. The new V12 engine continues to use conventional manifold fuel injection rather than direct injection due to concerns about the potential increase in particulate emissions associated with direct injection petrol engines. The DB11 V12 can run the quarter-mile in 11.7 seconds.

In May 2018, Aston Martin introduced the DB11 Aston Martin Racing (AMR) version, which succeeded the DB11 V12 and offered enhanced performance capabilities compared to its predecessor. The previous DB11 V12 had been in production for eighteen months. The updated DB11 AMR produces a power output of 470 kW (630 hp; 639 PS) at 6,500 rpm and a torque output of 700 N⋅m (516 lb⋅ft) at 1,500 rpm, sufficient to give the car a zero to 97 km/h (60 mph) acceleration of 3.7 seconds and a maximum speed of 335 kilometres per hour (208 mph). Its shift programming has been revised, its rear suspension is firmer and stiffer, and its twenty-inch forged wheels are 3.5 kilograms (7.7 lb) lighter.

Aston Martin introduced a limited edition of 100 DB11 AMR Signature Edition cars at the beginning of production, featuring a Stirling Green paint scheme with lime green accents. It has a zero to 97 km/h (60 mph) acceleration of 3.5 seconds—0.2 seconds faster than the base AMR. Deliveries started in the second quarter of 2018. In July 2021, Aston Martin announced that the AMR name would no longer be used for the V12-powered DB11 as part of their updated model lineup.

=== DB11 V8 ===
The original V12 model was supplemented by an entry-level V8 version in June 2017. Powered by a 4.0-litre Mercedes-Benz M177 twin-turbocharged V8 engine developed by Mercedes-AMG, this configuration achieves a weight reduction of 115 kilograms (254 lb) compared to the V12 variant, resulting in a total kerb weight of 1,760 kilograms (3,880 lb). In contrast to the V12 model, the DB11 V8 has a weight distribution of 49 per cent at the front and 51 per cent at the rear. The V8 engine delivers 375 kW (503 hp; 510 PS) and 675 N⋅m (498 lb⋅ft), providing the car with a zero to 97 km/h (60 mph) in four seconds and a top speed of 301 kilometres per hour (187 mph). In July 2021, Aston Martin revealed an upgraded version of the DB11 V8. The power output was increased to 535 PS (393 kW; 528 hp), allowing the car to accelerate from zero to 97 km/h (60 mph) in 3.9 seconds and reach a higher top speed of 309 kilometres per hour (192 mph).

=== DB11 Volante ===
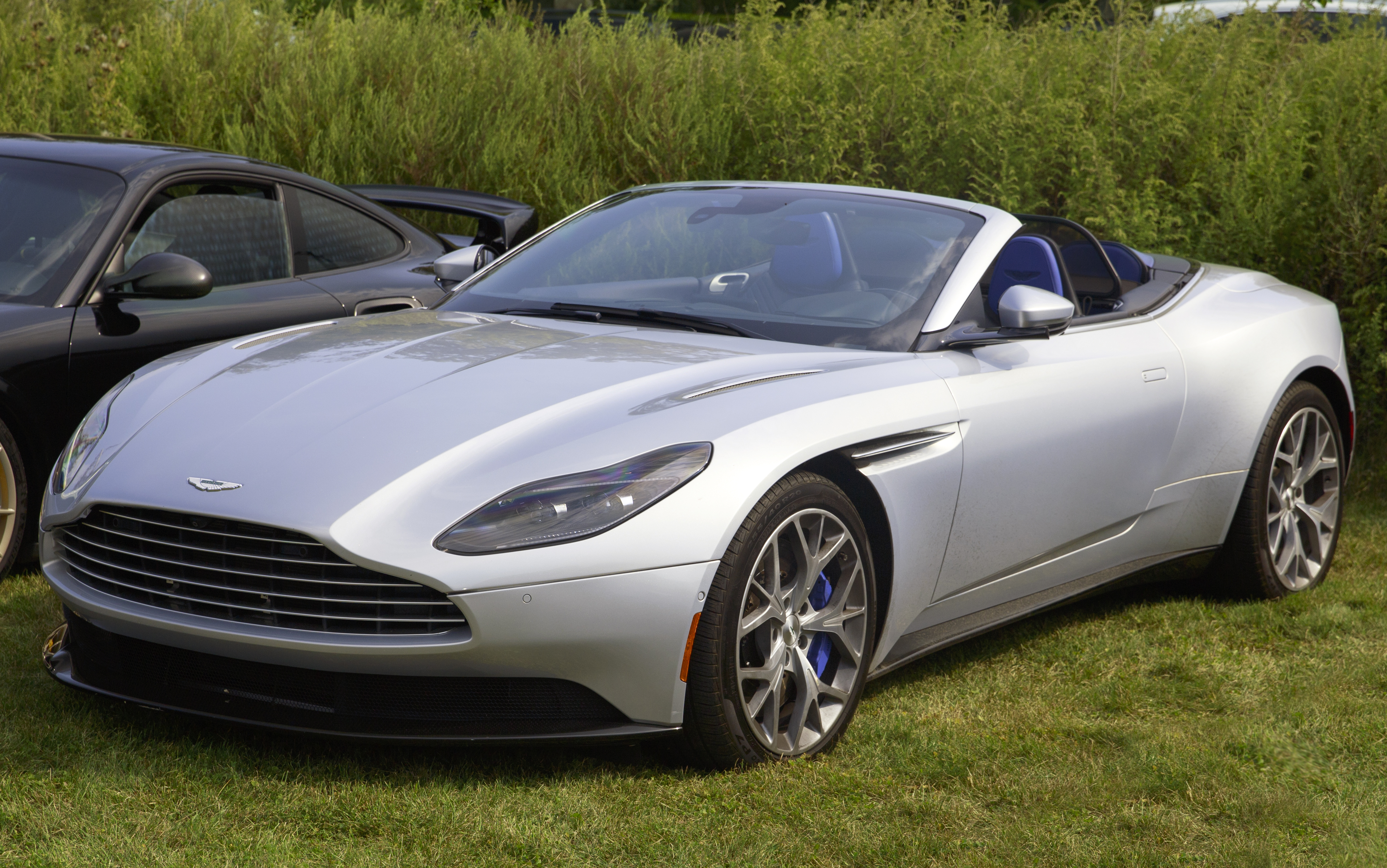
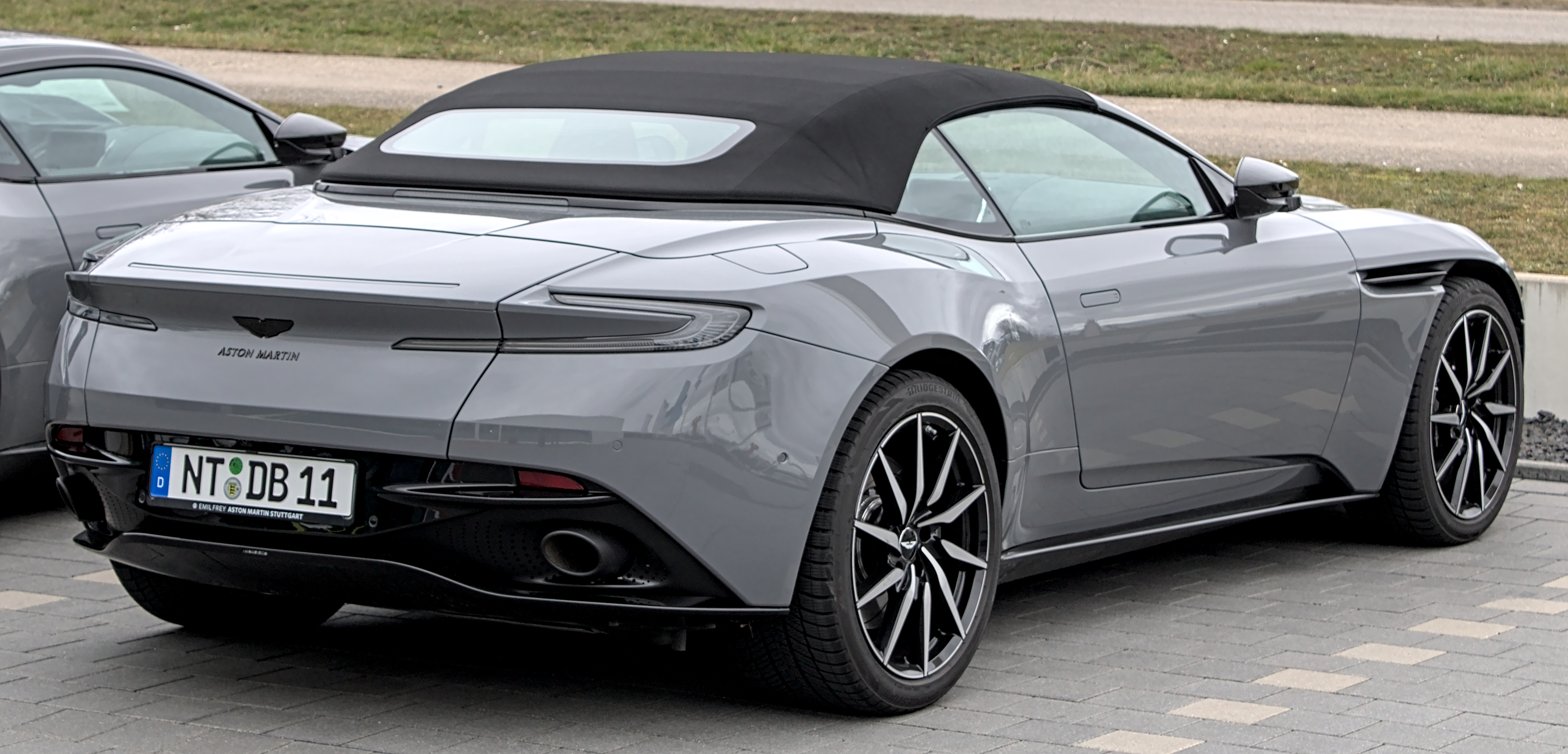
The DB11 Volante

In October 2017, Aston Martin introduced the DB11 Volante, a convertible version of the DB11. The Volante has a weight distribution of 47 per cent at the front and 53 per cent at the rear, and is powered by the same 4.0-litre twin-turbocharged V8 engine as the DB11 V8 coupe, albeit with more torque, at 696 N⋅m (513 lb⋅ft). The DB11 Volante can accelerate from zero to 97 km/h (60 mph) in 4.1 seconds and possesses a maximum speed of 301 kilometres per hour (187 mph). The additional lower body strengthening and the electric roof mechanism in this version increase the weight by approximately 110 kilograms (240 lb).

== Reception ==
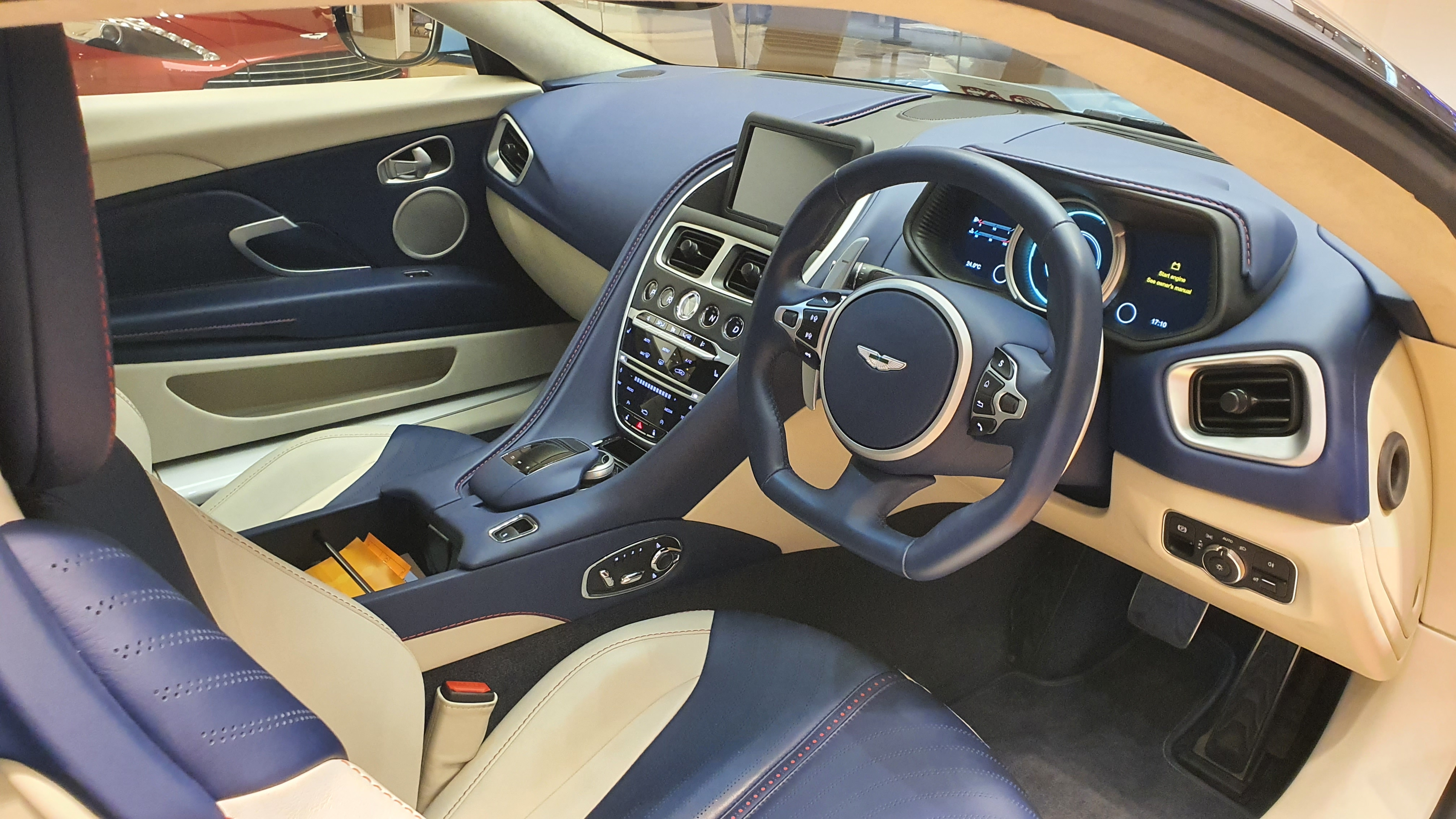
Interior

The DB11 has received mostly positive reviews. The journalist Jeremy Clarkson of The Sunday Times described the car as "phenomenally good", humorously noting, "if you're ever in Paris, at a party at 3 a.m., and suddenly remember you are playing in a tennis tournament in Monte Carlo the next afternoon, this is the car for the job. You'd arrive feeling like you'd just got out of the bath". Reviewing for The Gazette, Peter Bleakney called the DB11 Volante "quite possibly the most beautiful grand tourer money can buy" and a "dynamic gem that wafts as it should yet engages, excites and shines when put on a challenging road". Jack Rix of Top Gear stated that the DB11 marked "a solid start to a future portfolio that will be studded with flashier and faster members than this, but none that are quite so suited to being enjoyed every day, wherever you're heading".

Car criticised the DB11 AMR's interior, stating that the "motorised cubbyhole lid feels like it's on its last legs and the infotainment's poor, particularly the [sat]nav", but called it a "beautiful car to look at and to drive—particularly at speed". Matt Saunders of Autocar noted that its door sills are "slimmer than those of the DB9, making ingress easier as you swing your legs over and into the car's deep and roomy-feeling footwell". In 2017, the DB11 won the Golden Steering Wheel award for most beautiful car of that year.
