= Aston Martin V12 engine =

Aston Martin V12 engines
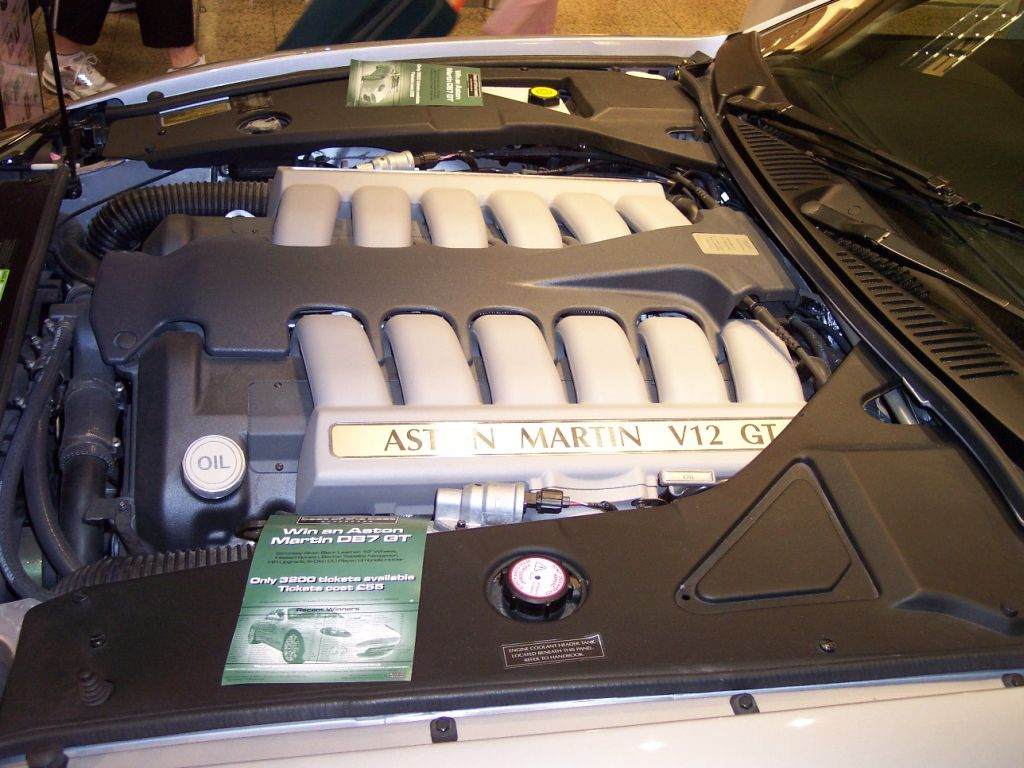

Overview
- Manufacturer: Aston Martin
- Production: 1999–present

Layout
- Configuration: 60° V12
- Displacement: 5.2 L (5,203 cc; 317.5 cu in); 5.9 L (5,935 cc; 362.2 cu in); 7.3 L (7,312 cc; 446.2 cu in)
- Cylinder bore: 89 mm (3.50 in); 94 mm (3.70 in)
- Piston stroke: 69.7 mm (2.74 in); 79.5 mm (3.13 in); 87.8 mm (3.46 in)
- Valvetrain: 48-valve, DOHC, four-valves per cylinder
- Compression ratio: 9.3:1–11:1

Combustion
- Turbocharger: Twin-turbocharged (2016–present)
- Fuel system: Sequential multi-port fuel injection
- Oil system: Wet sump or Dry sump

Output
- Power output: 420–1,000 hp (313–746 kW)
- Torque output: 400–738 lb⋅ft (542–1,001 N⋅m)

Dimensions
- Dry weight: 454–625 lb (206–283 kg)

Chronology
- Predecessor: Aston Martin V8 engine

Aston Martin has produced a number of V12 petrol engines for its models. The first version appeared in 1999, when a 5.9-litre, 60° V12 debuted in the Aston Martin DB7 Vantage.

== Overview ==
The original Aston Martin "AML V12" project began in 1994, at Ford's Advanced Powertrain division. As Aston Martin was owned by Ford at the time, this gave Aston Martin access to Ford's considerable engineering and technology resources.

The design goal was to build a unique V12 for Aston Martin, while leveraging many of Ford's best resources. The engine would be designed to compete at the Le Mans 24 Hours, deliver very high torque from low RPM as well as high-revving power, would be scalable for power growth well beyond a "normal duty" Ford engine, and would only use a component from other Ford projects if it made sense and did not compromise the design.

The AML V12 design featured all-new block, cylinder head and crankshaft designs, using the piston assemblies and valvetrain components from the then-upcoming Ford Duratec V6 family. The use of some Duratec components may have contributed to the myth of the AML V12 being "two Duratec V6s welded together". The reality is that the engines are quite different. The Duratec V6 is A319 cast aluminium with cast-in iron liners and bed-plate bottom end. The AML V12 is A365-T6 aluminium, features a deep-skirt six-bolt main block, thin-wall press-in liners and directly mounts nearly all of its drive accessories. It features 3.0mm-larger main bearings, a bank-to-bank offset approximately 15mm less than the V6, and has a completely different casting design including a precision water jacket. The cylinder heads differ as well. The Duratec V6s are A319 cast aluminium, the AML V12s are A365-T6 cast aluminium with unique combustion chambers, a higher compression ratio, a precision water jacket and unique intake ports (one of the design features that significantly improved low-end torque while maintaining high-end power).

The AML V12 ran for the first time in September 1995. The first engine completed was taken by Ford to be shown in the Indigo concept supercar. This version was unique in that it was dry-sumped, unlike the later production versions, and fitted with a Ford V12 nameplate. Engine number 2 was installed in a DB7, which was the intended platform for the engine.

The first time the public got to see the AML V12 with proper Aston Martin badging was in "Project Vantage", the prototype of the first-generation Vanquish shown at NAIAS in January 1998, a year before the 1999 Geneva Motor Show reveal of the DB7 Vantage. The DB7 Vantage became the first production model to feature the AML V12.

Ford and Aston Martin partnered with Cosworth Technology to manufacture the AML V12s, until Aston Martin's 12,500 m^{2} (135,000 sq ft) dedicated engine plant within the Ford Germany plant in Niehl, Cologne became operational in 2004.

The AML V12 has evolved over the years, with a number of power, torque, fuel efficiency, and emissions upgrades. In 2016, the design was significantly modified, with a reduction in displacement to 5.2 litres, and the addition of twin turbos. This engine made its debut in the Aston Martin DB11. In 2024, the engine received multiple enhancements for the third-generation Aston Martin Vanquish, including a new, stronger block to cope with the extra output, larger turbochargers that spin 15% faster and at up to 15% higher compression, new camshafts, new cylinder heads and new intake runners.

=== RA engine ===
The RA is a completely new 6.5-litre, naturally-aspirated V12 engine, commissioned by Adrian Newey, and co-designed, developed and produced by Cosworth, in partnership and collaboration with Aston Martin, for the Aston Martin Valkyrie. It is not directly related to the original AM V12 design. The road-going engine is rated at 1,000 hp (746 kW; 1,014 PS) at 10,500 rpm, with a max torque figure of 740 N⋅m (546 lbf⋅ft) at 7,000 rpm, making it the most powerful naturally-aspirated engine ever fitted and used in a production road car. The engine also revs to a maximum of 11,100 rpm, and has a power density making 114.8 kW (156.1 PS; 153.9 hp) per litre.

== Applications ==
=== Road cars ===
==== 5.2L Twin Turbo (AE31) ====
- Aston Martin DB11 V12 (2016–2023)
- Aston Martin DBS Superleggera (2018–2024)
- Aston Martin V12 Vantage/V12 Speedster (2020–2022)
- Aston Martin DBR22 (2022)
- Aston Martin Valour (2023)
- Aston Martin Valiant (2024)
- Aston Martin Vanquish (2024–present)

==== 5.9L ====
- Aston Martin DB7 V12 Vantage/GT/GTA (AM2/AM2A)
- Aston Martin DB9 (2004–2016) (AM04/AM09/AM11)
- Aston Martin V12 Vanquish (2001–2005) (AM03)
- Aston Martin V12 Vanquish S (2004–2007) (AM06)
- Aston Martin V12 Vantage (2009–2018) (AM11/AM28)
- Aston Martin Virage (2011–2012) (AM11)
- Aston Martin DBS (2007–2012) (AM08)
- Aston Martin Vanquish (2012–2018) (AM28/AM29)
- Aston Martin Vanquish S (2017–2018) (AM29)
- Aston Martin Rapide (2010–2020) (AM11/AM29)
- Aston Martin V12 Zagato (AM11)

==== 6.5L ====
- Aston Martin Valkyrie (Aston Martin-Cosworth RA 6.5L)

==== 7.0–7.3L ====
- Aston Martin Vulcan (7.0L)
- Aston Martin One-77 (7.3L Modified by Cosworth) (AM77)
- Aston Martin Victor (7.3L Modified by Cosworth)

=== Race cars ===
==== 6.0L ====
- Aston Martin DBR9 (AM04)
- Lola B08/60 (AM04)
- Lola-Aston Martin B09/60 (AM04)
