= Marek Reichman =

English industrial designer

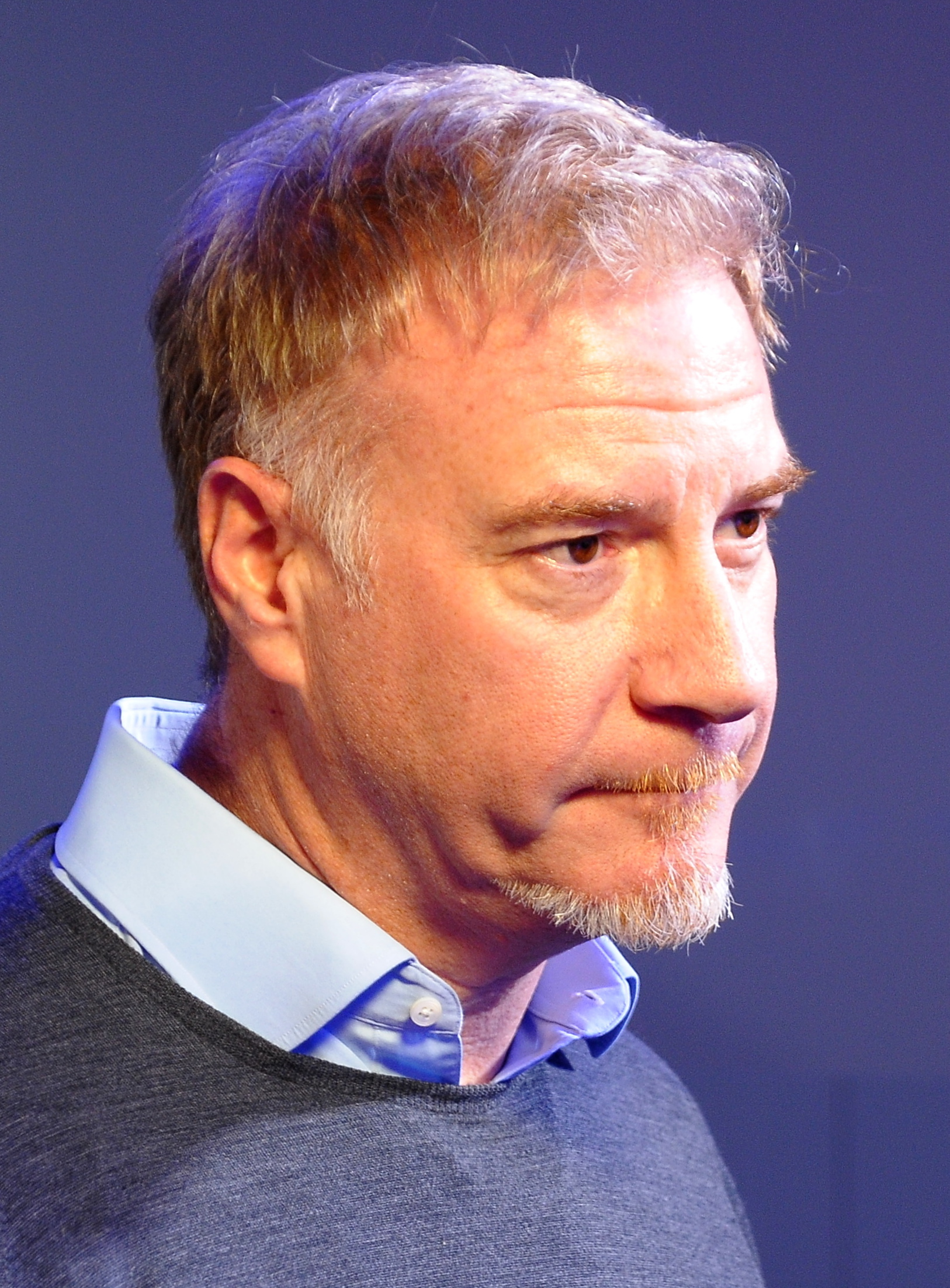
- Reichman in 2020
- Born: Marek Paul Reichman; 1966 (age 59–60); Sheffield, England
- Education: University of Teesside; Royal College of Art
- Occupation: Car designer
- Employer: Aston Martin

Marek Paul Reichman (born 1966) is a British industrial designer. He is chief creative officer and studio head at Aston Martin.

== Early life ==
Reichman was born in Sheffield in South Yorkshire to an English mother and Polish father. His father's job as a blacksmith and his family's love for cars influenced his interest in industrial design. He graduated from Teesside University in Middlesbrough with a first class honours degree in industrial design, then studied vehicle design at the Royal College of Art in London as the first Land Rover student. About his early life he stated:

My father worked as a blacksmith, which is why I grew up with knowledge of making things. It's where I picked up my artistic skills, and realised that design surrounds us, whether it's through a traditional method of designing or through a craft. Design is integral to the human race. My father is Polish, and my mother is English. I grew up in a family with many car fanatics. I wanted to be an industrial designer, to learn the science behind materials, so I studied industrial design to get the knowledge base.

== Career ==
He started his career in 1991 with Rover Group. After BMW's 1995 acquisition of Rover, he moved to BMW Designworks in California, eventually becoming senior designer and leading the design direction of Land Rover, most significantly the 2003 Range Rover (L322). In May 2005, he became director of design for Aston Martin.

In 2008, he became an assistant professor at the Royal College of Art.

== Portfolio ==
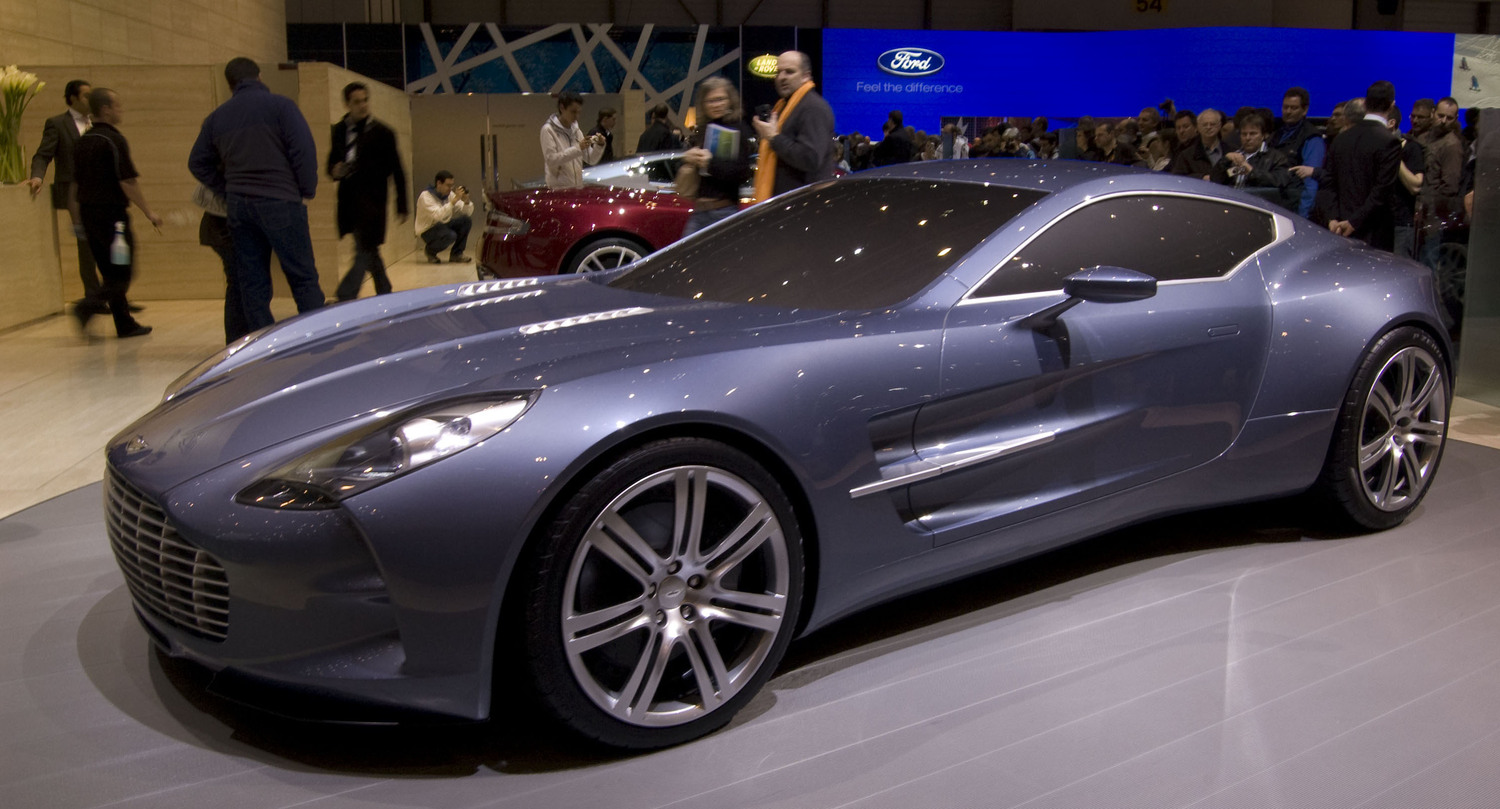
Aston Martin One-77, designed by Marek Reichman

His projects include the Aston Martin One-77, the DBS, the Rapide, the 2012 Aston Martin Vanquish, the Aston Martin Vulcan and the Navicross Concept Cars.

In June 2014, the Aston Martin DP-100 was unveiled, which is a concept car designed for the video game Gran Turismo 6.

In 2015 Reichman directed the design of the Aston Martin DB10 concept car, used in the James Bond film Spectre. Also that year, Reichman hired the artist Kaves to do a unique paint job on their new Aston Martin Vanquish the "Vanquish Volante". According to Kaves he "wanted to have an art car, something tattoo-inspired, so he came to me." The car was meant to be auctioned at "The Art Basel" but reported to have been sold prior to the event.

== Recognition ==
Reichman was awarded an honorary doctorate by Teesside University in 2011.
