= List of Aston Martin vehicles =

The following is a list of Aston Martin automobiles ordered by year of introduction.

== Pre-war cars ==
- 1921–1925 Aston Martin Standard Sports
- 1927–1932 Aston Martin First Series
- 1929–1932 Aston Martin International
- 1932–1932 Aston Martin International Le Mans
- 1932–1934 Aston Martin Le Mans
- 1933–1934 Aston Martin 12/50 Standard
- 1934–1936 Aston Martin Mk II
- 1934–1936 Aston Martin Ulster
- 1936–1940 Aston Martin 500-litre Speed Models (23 built) The last 8 were fitted with C-type bodywork
- 1937–1939 Aston Martin 15/98

== Post-war cars ==
- 1948–1950 Aston Martin 2-Litre Sports (DB1)
- 1950–1953 Aston Martin DB2
- 1953–1957 Aston Martin DB2/4
- 1957–1959 Aston Martin DB Mark III
- 1958–1963 Aston Martin DB4
- 1961–1963 Aston Martin DB4 GT Zagato
- 1963–1965 Aston Martin DB5
- 1965–1966 Aston Martin Short Chassis Volante
- 1965–1969 Aston Martin DB6
- 1967–1972 Aston Martin DBS
- 1969–1989 Aston Martin V8
- 1977–1989 Aston Martin V8 Vantage
- 1986–1990 Aston Martin V8 Zagato
- 1989–1996 Aston Martin Virage/Virage Volante
- 1989–2000 Aston Martin Virage
- 1993–2000 Aston Martin Vantage
- 1996–2000 Aston Martin V8 Coupe/V8 Volante
- 1993–2003 Aston Martin DB7/DB7 Vantage
- 2001–2007 Aston Martin V12 Vanquish/Vanquish S
- 2002–2003 Aston Martin DB7 Zagato
- 2002–2004 Aston Martin DB AR1
- 2004–2016 Aston Martin DB9
- 2005–2018 Aston Martin V8 and V12 Vantage
- 2007–2012 Aston Martin DBS V12
- 2009–2012 Aston Martin One-77
- 2010–2020 Aston Martin Rapide/Rapide S
- 2011–2012 Aston Martin Virage/Virage Volante
- 2011–2013 Aston Martin Cygnet, based on the Toyota iQ
- 2012–2013 Aston Martin V12 Zagato
- 2012–2018 Aston Martin Vanquish/Vanquish Volante
- 2015–2016 Aston Martin Vulcan
- 2016–2023 Aston Martin DB11
- 2018–present Aston Martin Vantage
- 2018–2024 Aston Martin DBS Superleggera
- 2020–present Aston Martin DBX
- 2021–2024 Aston Martin Valkyrie
- 2023–present Aston Martin DB12
- 2024–present Aston Martin Vanquish
- 2025–present Aston Martin Valhalla

== Current models ==
Model	Model Year
DBX	2020
DB12	2024
Vantage	2018
Vanquish	2024
Valhalla	2025
Valen	2026

== Concept and Special editions ==
- 1944 Aston Martin Atom (concept)
- 1961–1964 Lagonda Rapide
- 1976–1989 Aston Martin Lagonda
- 1980 Aston Martin Bulldog (concept)
- 1993 Lagonda Vignale (concept)
- 2007 Aston Martin V12 Vantage RS (concept)
- 2007–2008 Aston Martin V8 Vantage N400
- 2009 Aston Martin Lagonda SUV (concept)
- 2010 Aston Martin V12 Vantage Carbon Black Edition
- 2010 Aston Martin DBS Carbon Black Edition
- 2013 Aston Martin Rapide Bertone Jet 2+2 (concept)
- 2013 Aston Martin CC100 Speedster (concept)
- 2015 Aston Martin DB10 (concept)
- 2015–2016 Lagonda Taraf
- 2020– Aston Martin V12 Speedster
- 2020– Aston Martin Vantage 007 Edition
- 2020– Aston Martin DBS Superleggera 007 Edition
- 2020 Aston Martin Victor
- 2022– Aston Martin V12 Vantage (Coupe & Roadster)
- 2023– Aston Martin DBS 770 Ultimate (Coupe & Cabriolet)
- 2023–2024 Aston Martin Valour
- 2025 Aston Martin Valiant

== Gallery ==
Aston Martin models

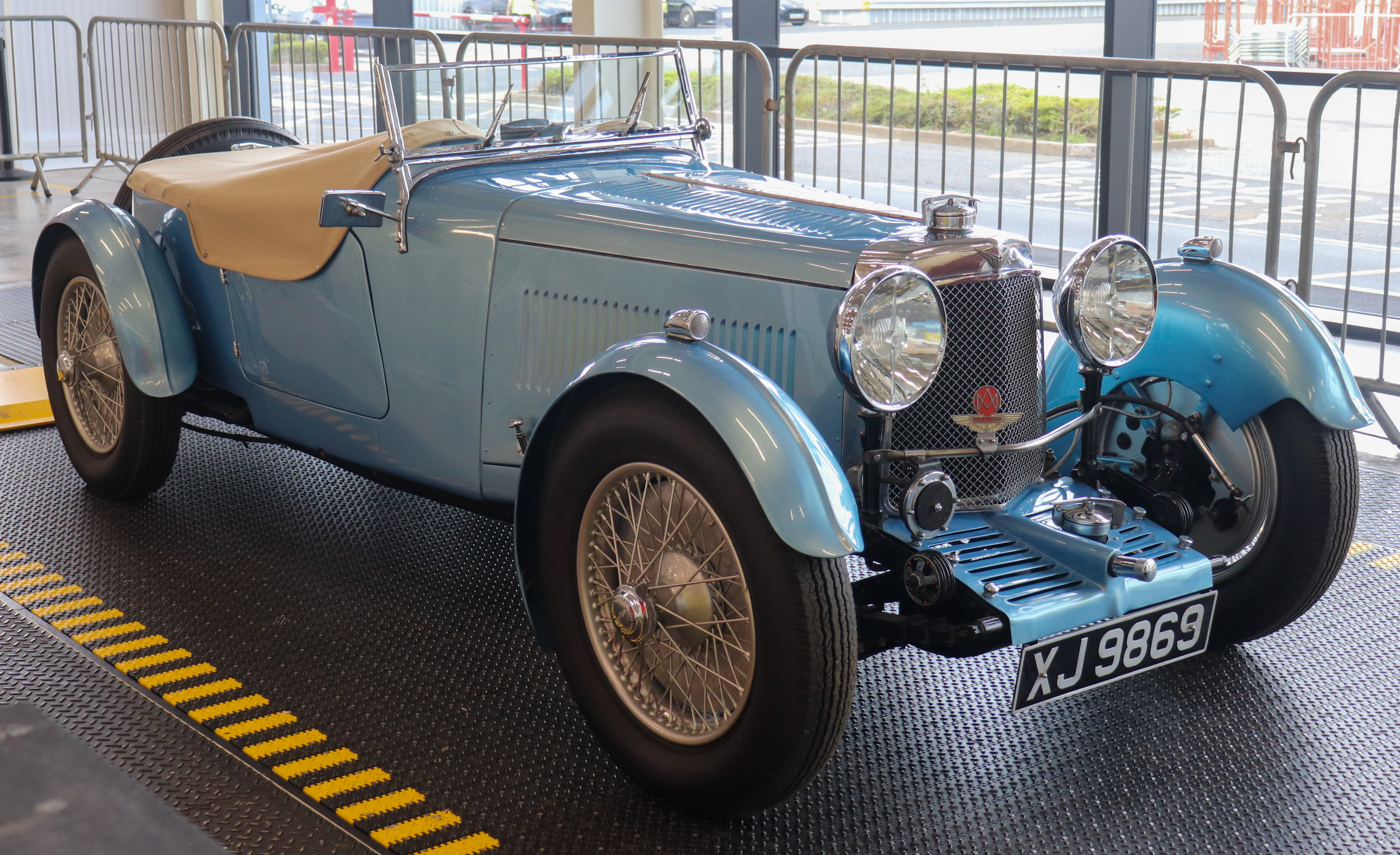
1932–1934 Aston Martin Le Mans

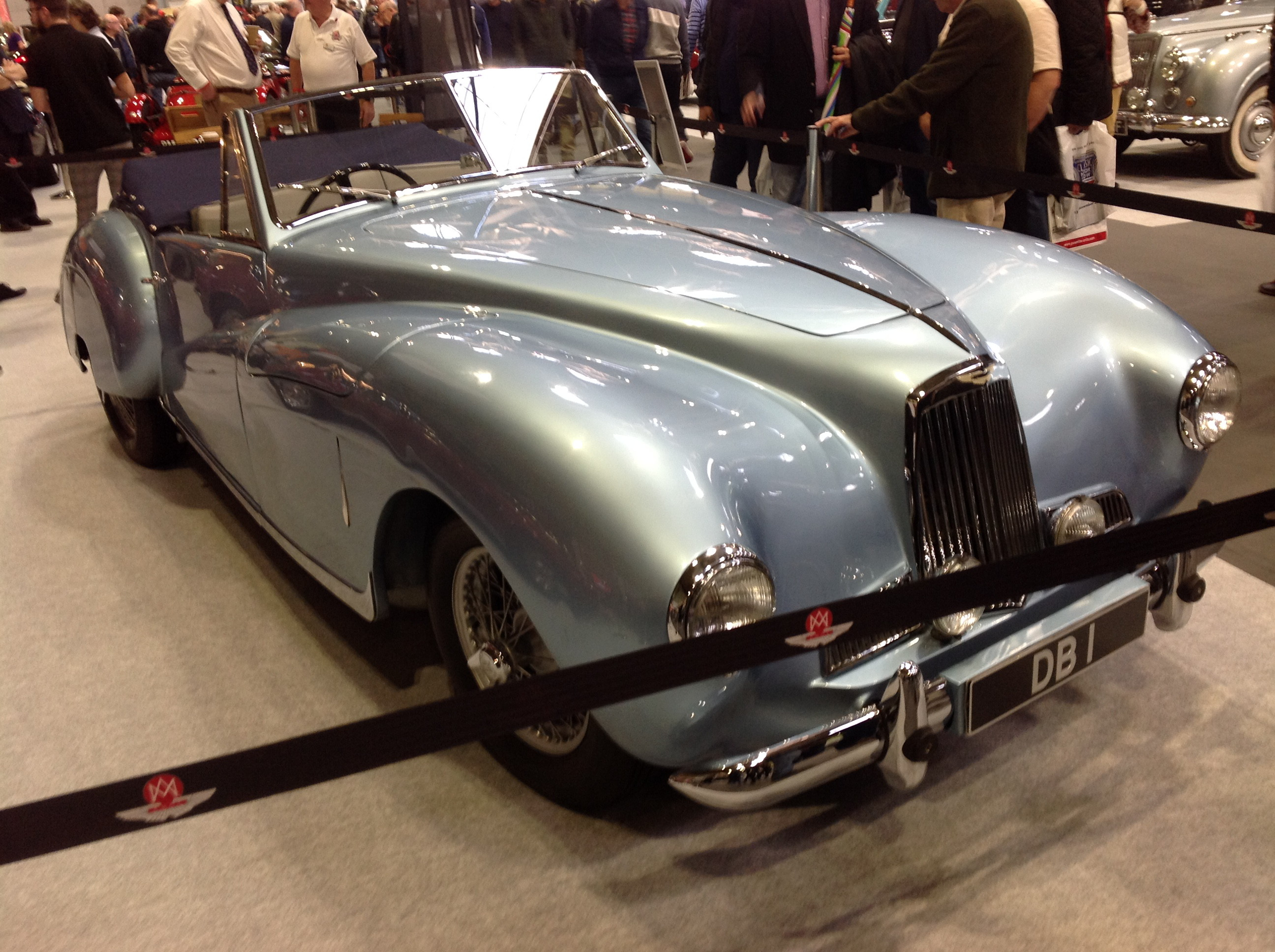
1948–1950 Aston Martin DB1

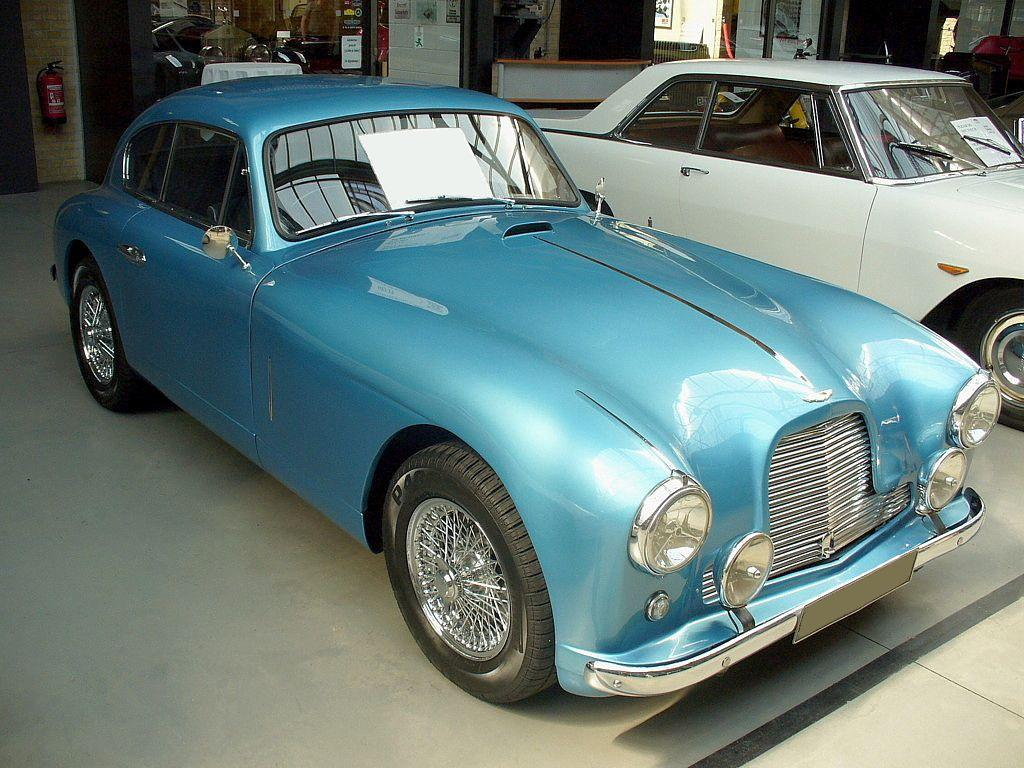
1950–1957 DB2 and later DB2/4

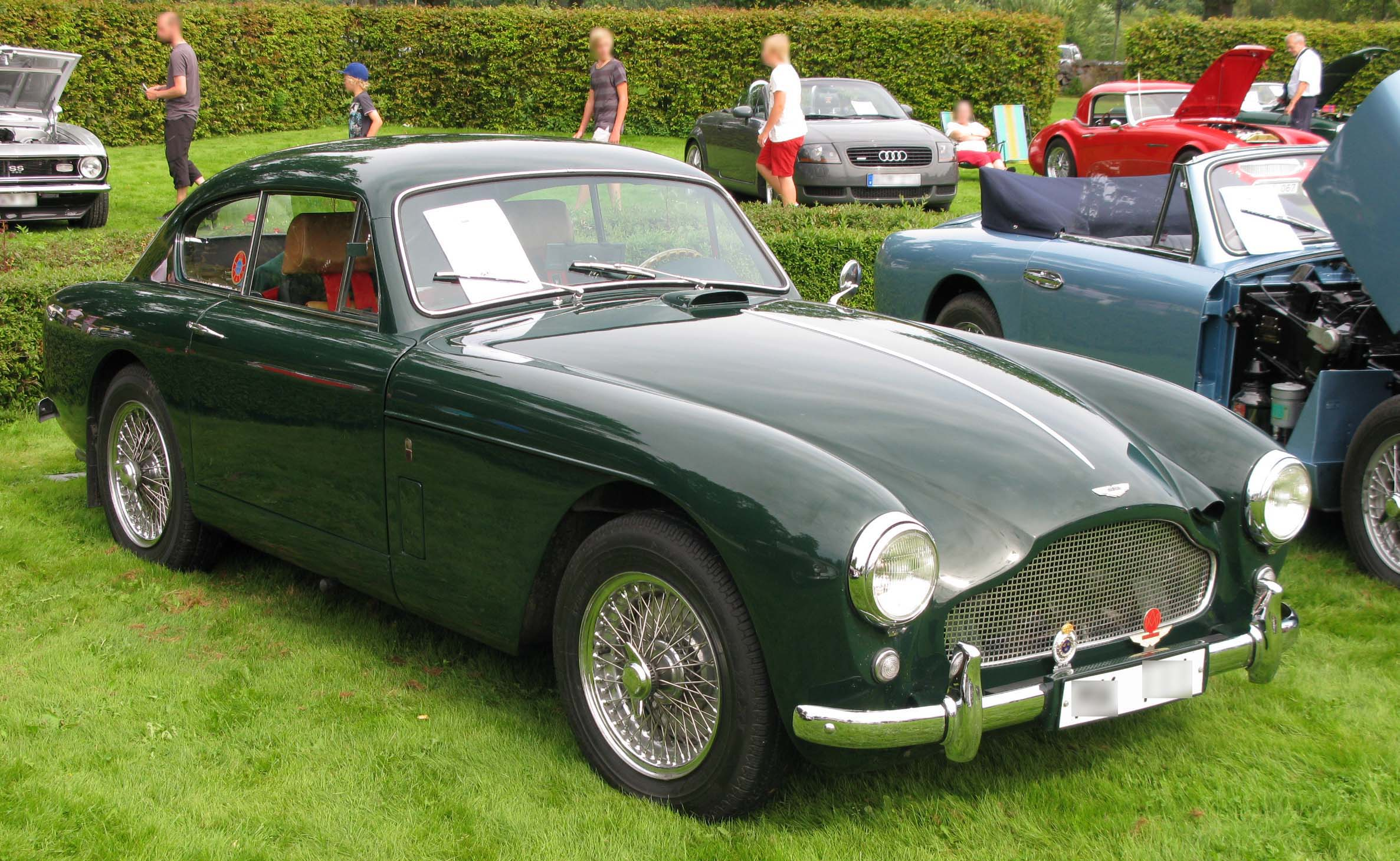
1957–1959 Aston Martin DB Mark III

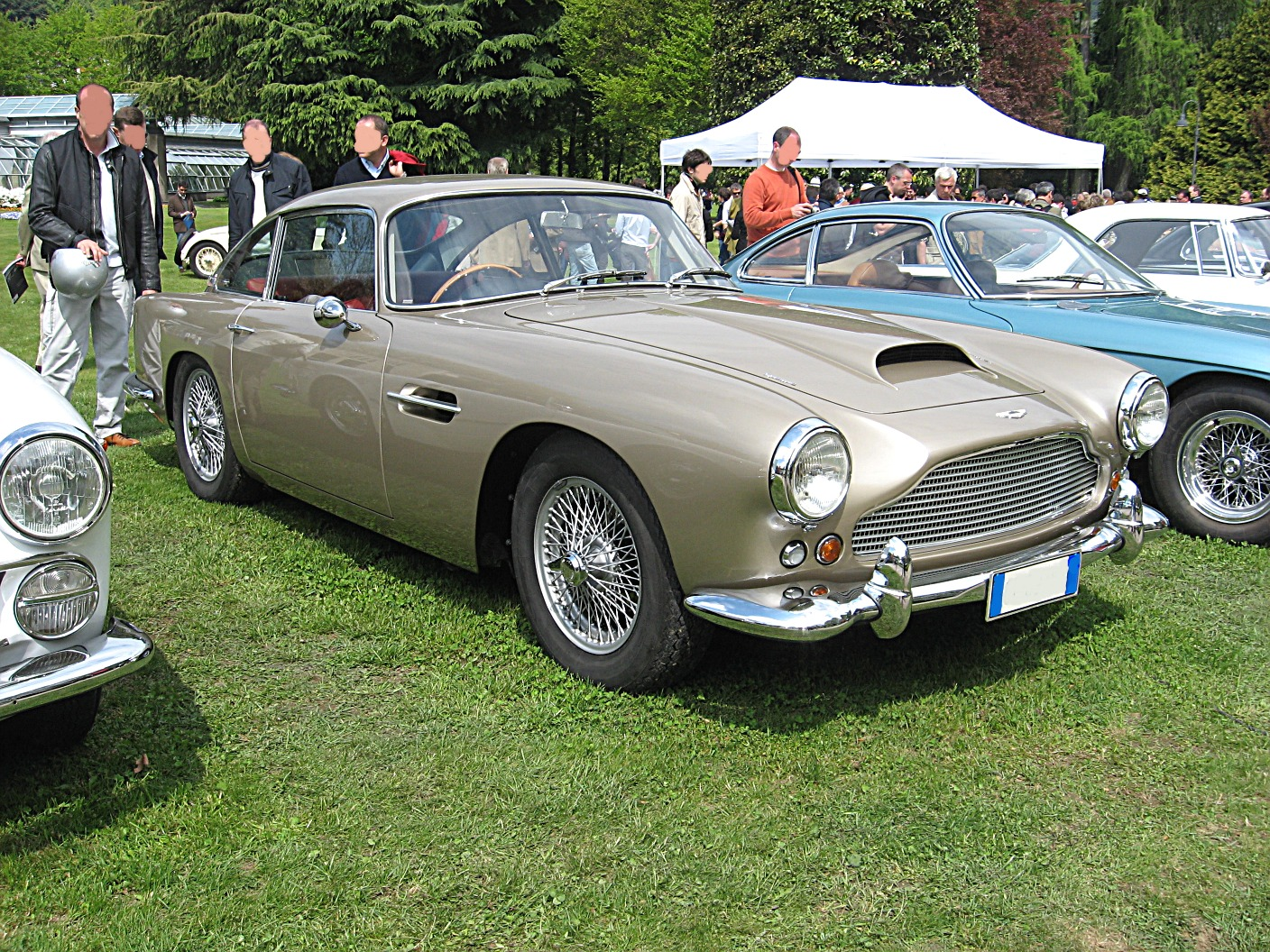
1958–1963 Aston Martin DB4/GT

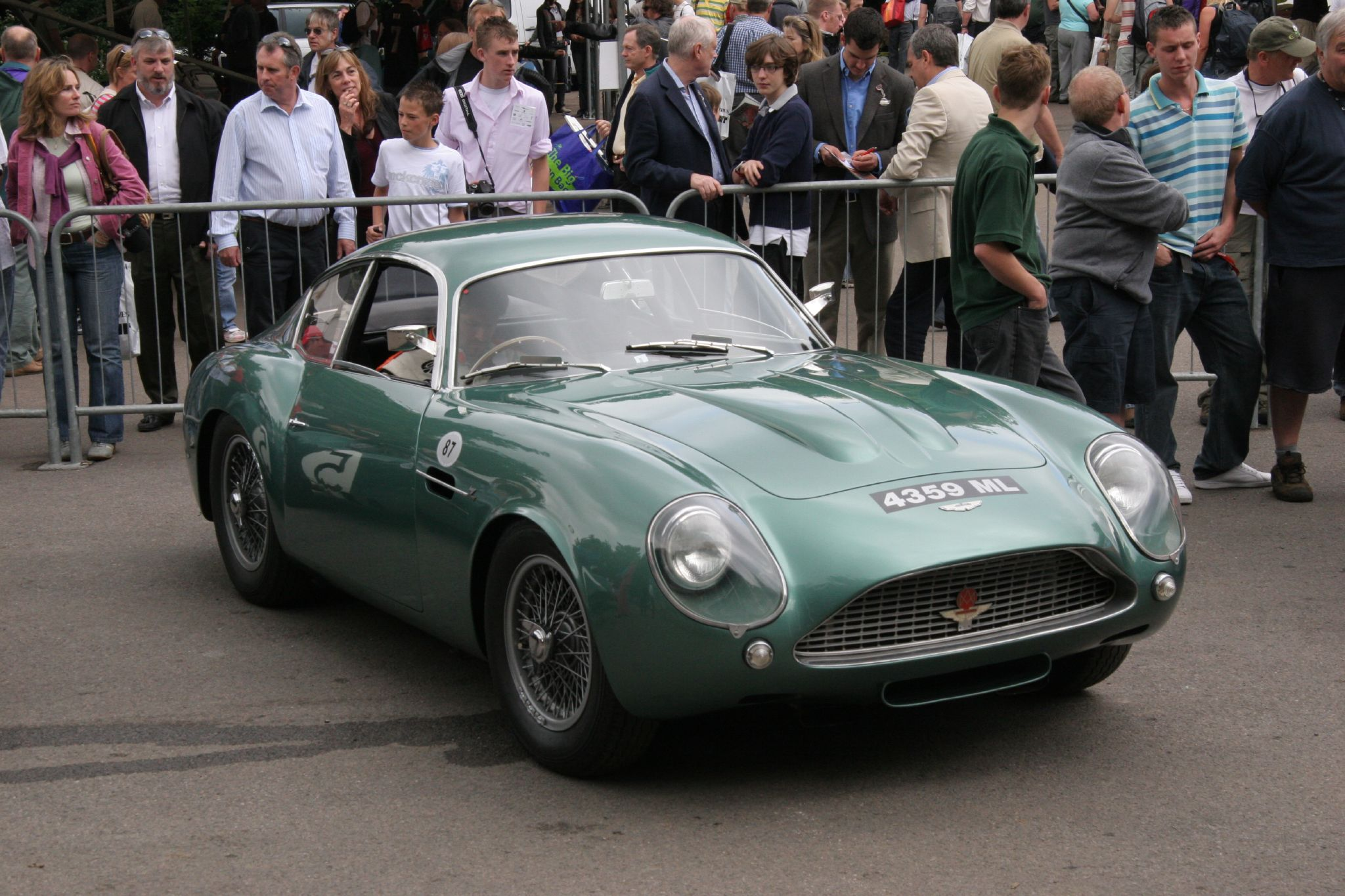
1961–1963 Aston Martin DB4 GT Zagato

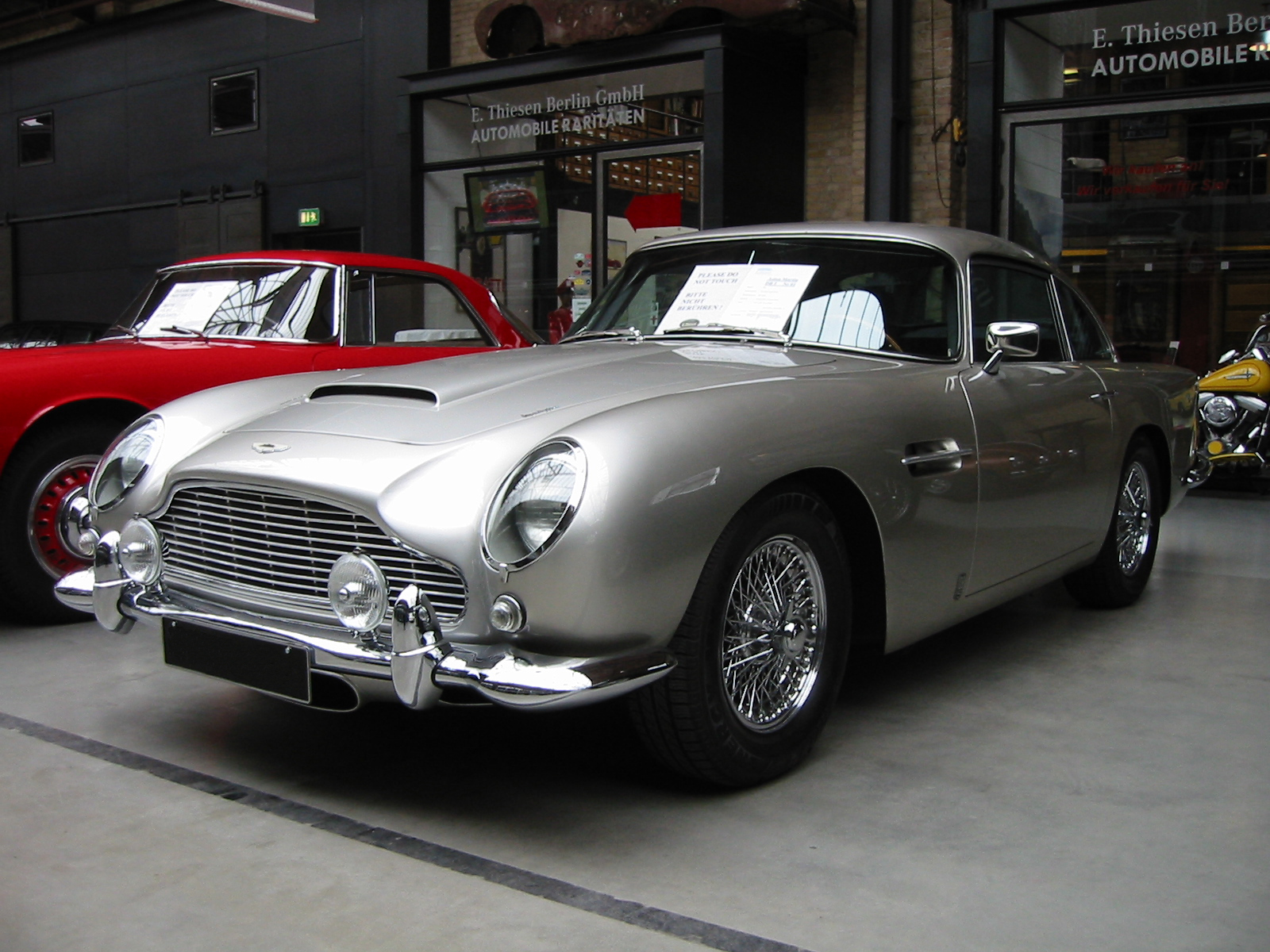
1963–1965 Aston Martin DB5

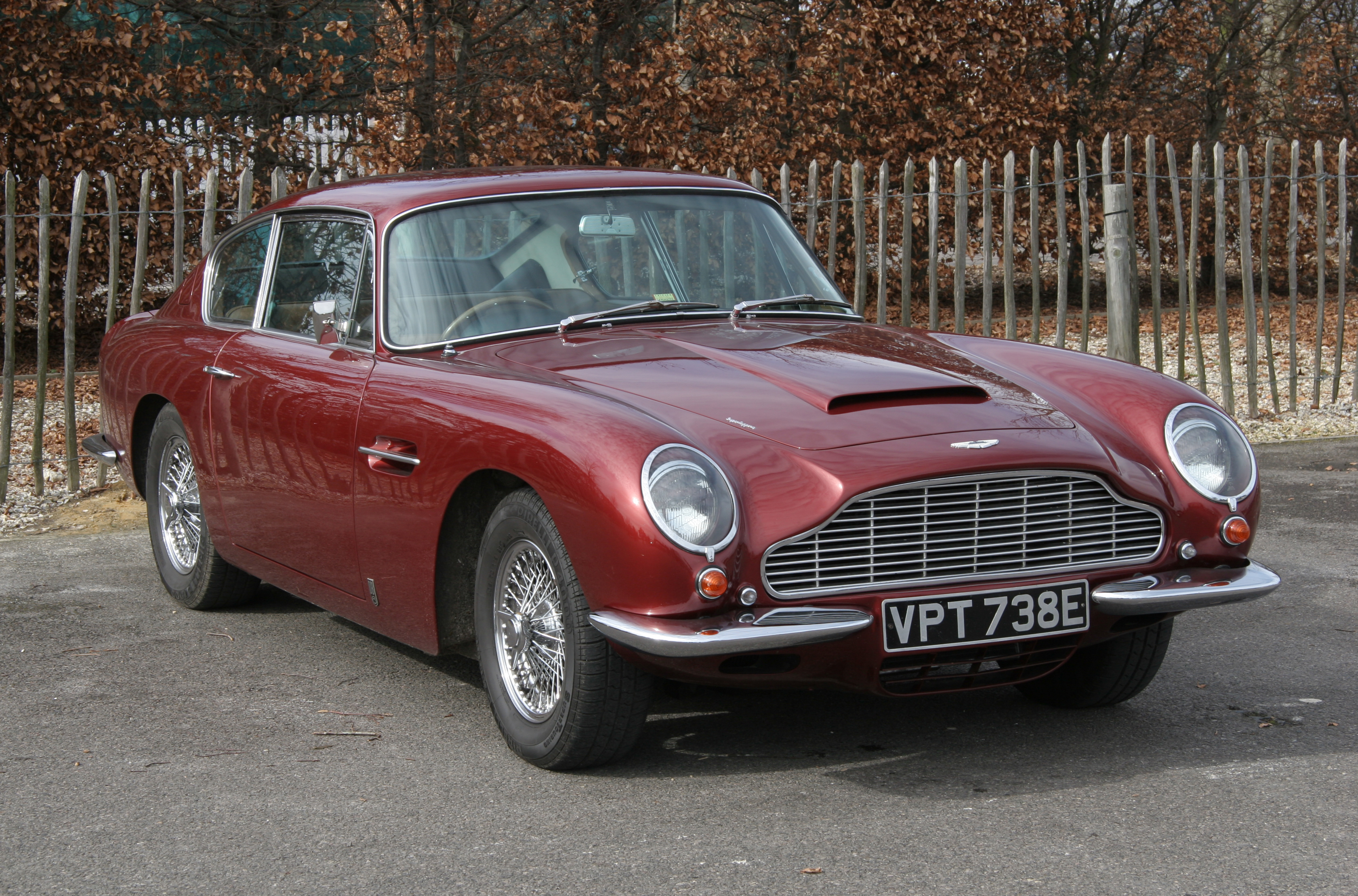
1965–1971 Aston Martin DB6

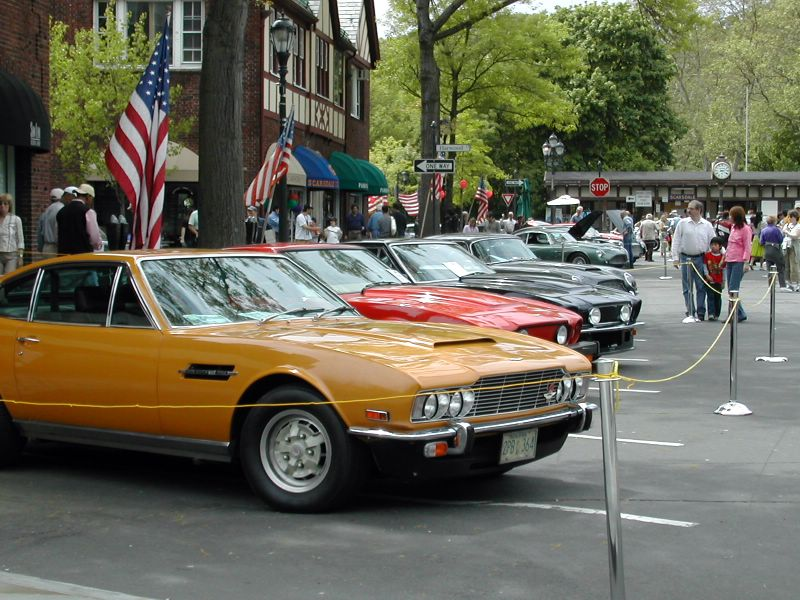
1967–1989 DBS and later V8s

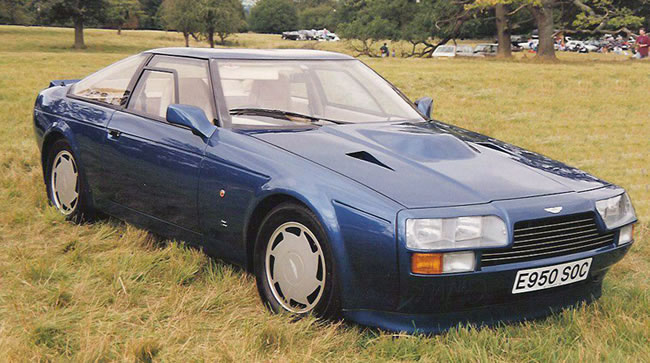
1986–1990 Aston Martin V8 Zagato

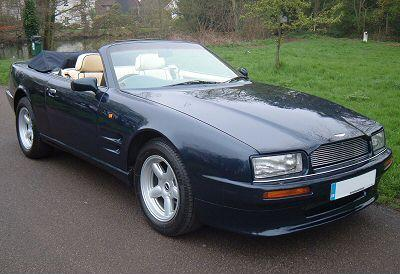
1989–2000 Virage/V8/Vantage

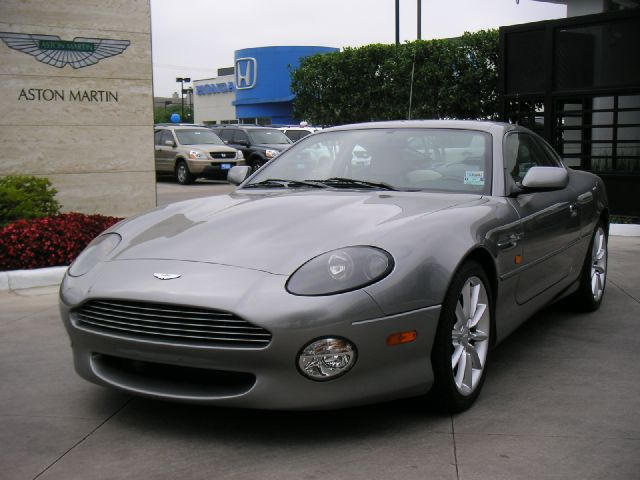
1993–2003 Aston Martin DB7/Vantage

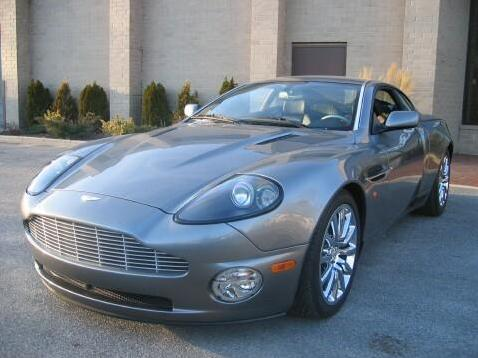
2001–2007 Aston Martin V12 Vanquish/S

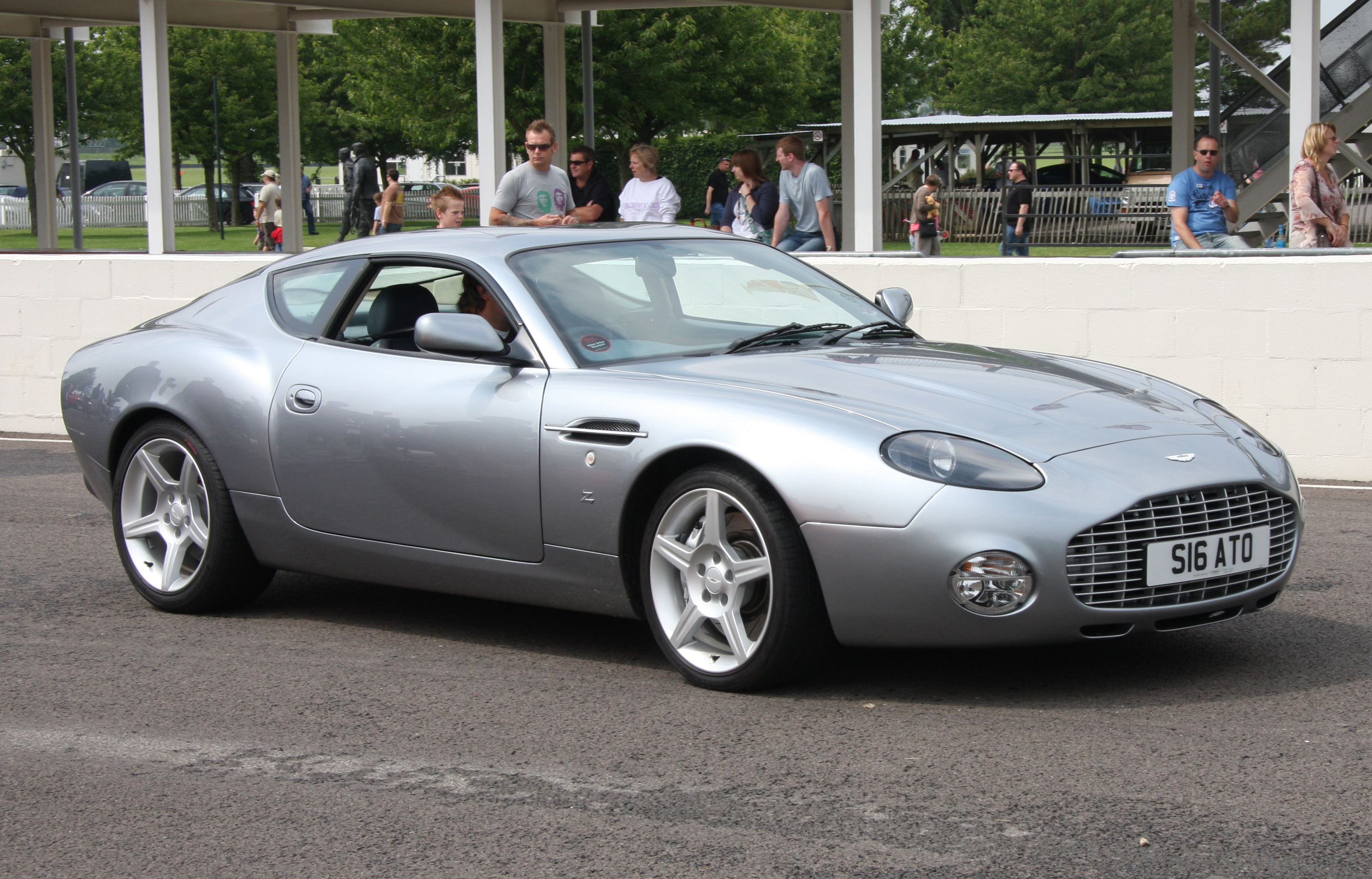
2002–2003 DB7 Zagato coupé/roadster

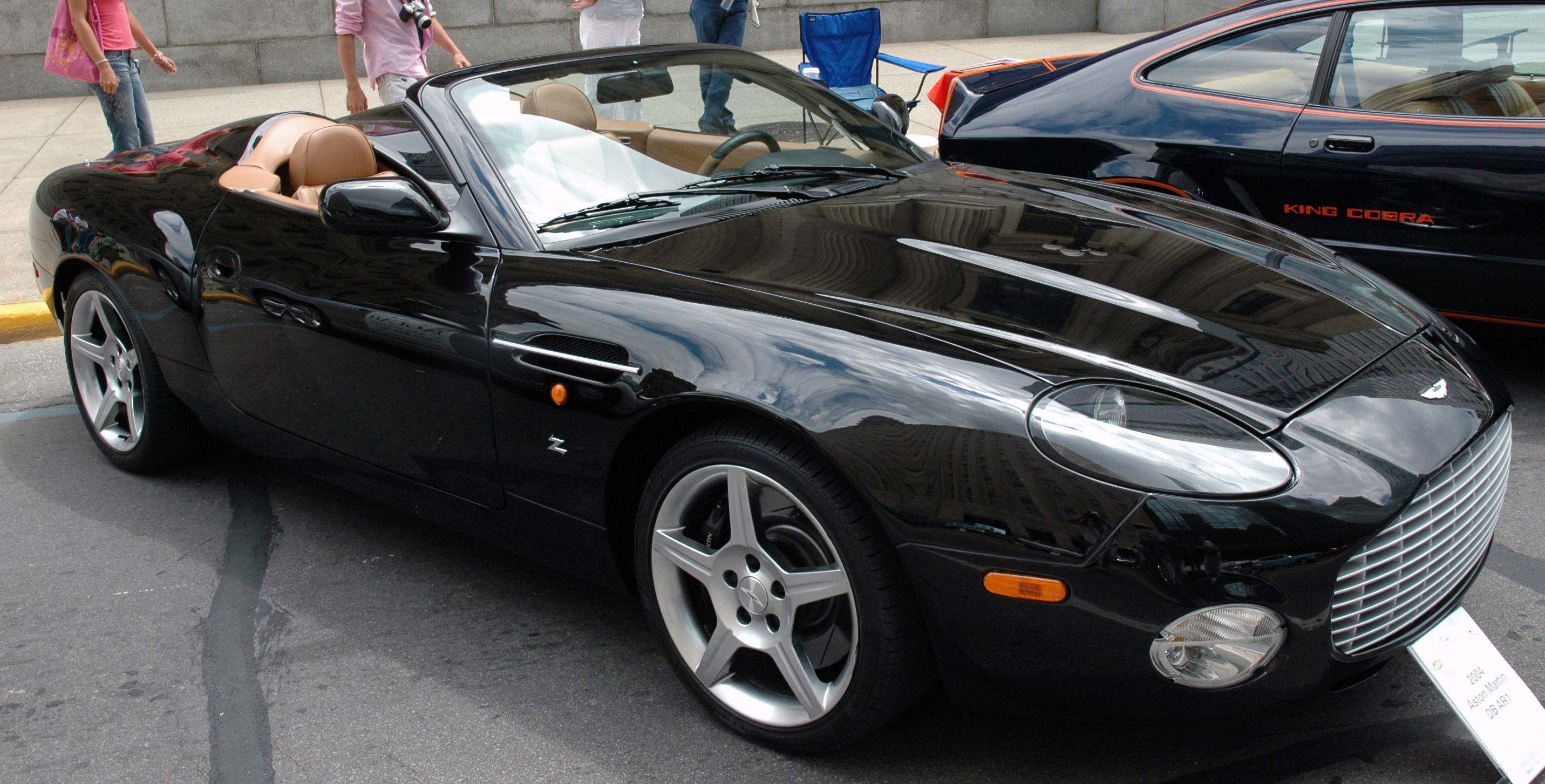
2002–2004 Aston Martin DB AR1 roadster

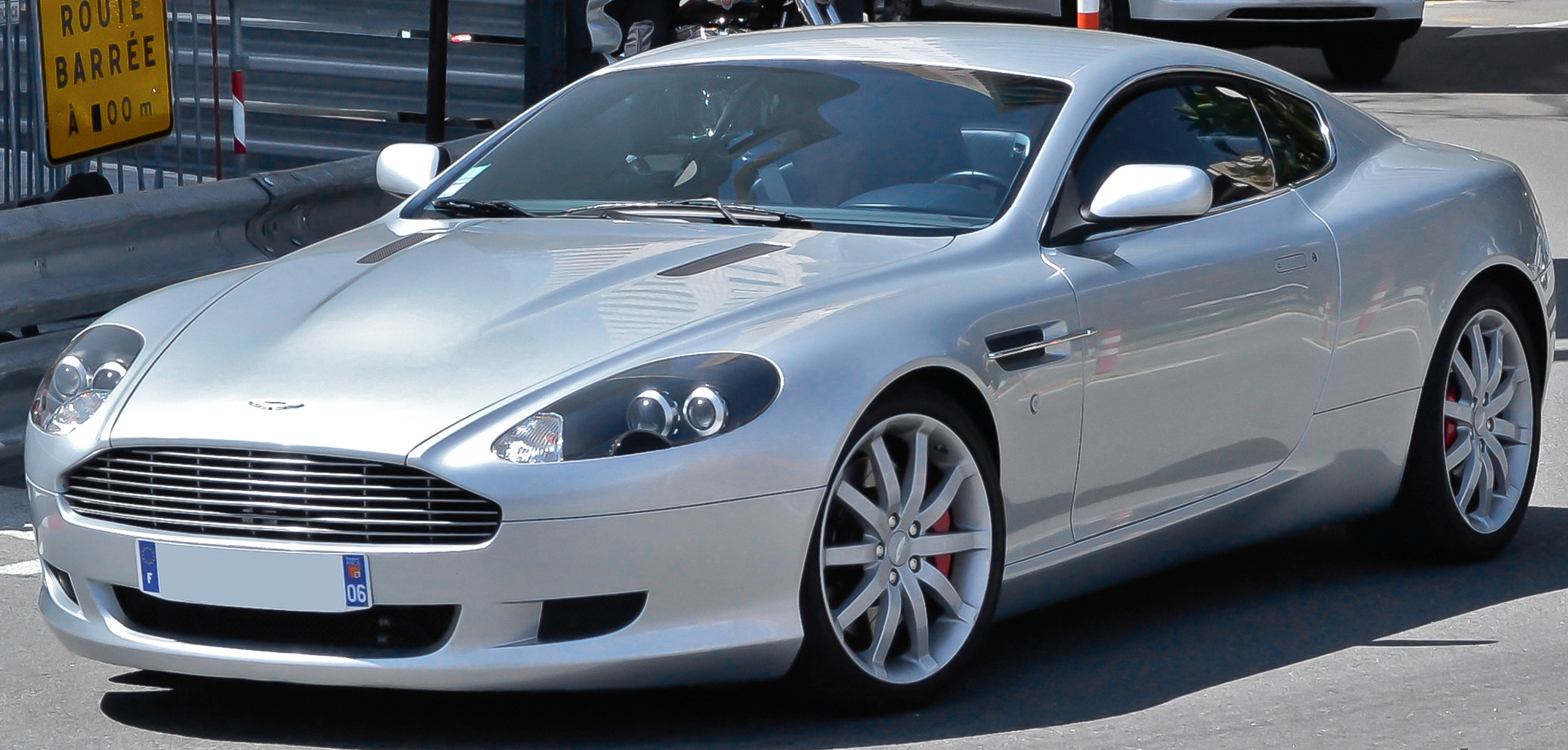
2003–2016 Aston Martin DB9 coupé/Volante

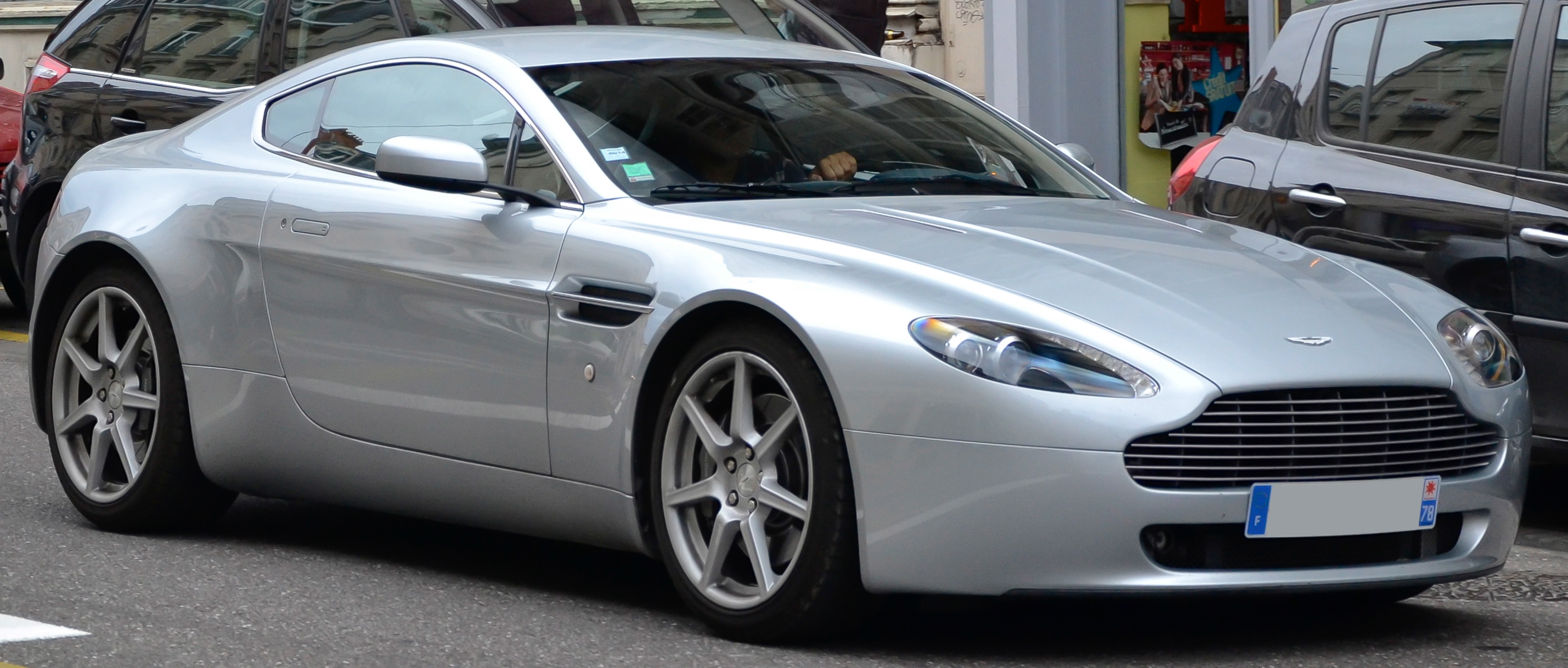
2005–2017 Aston Martin V8/V12 Vantage

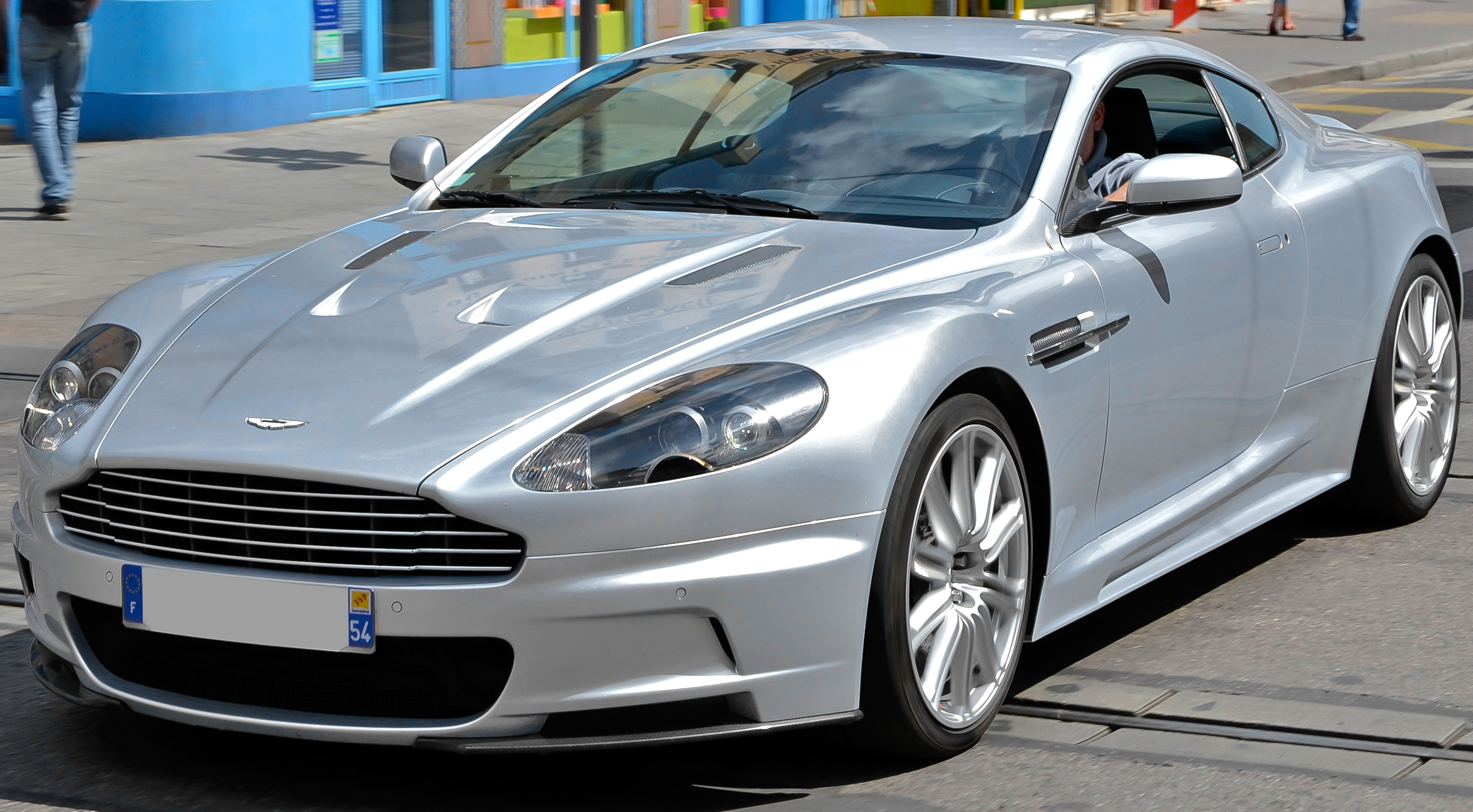
2007–2012 Aston Martin DBS V12

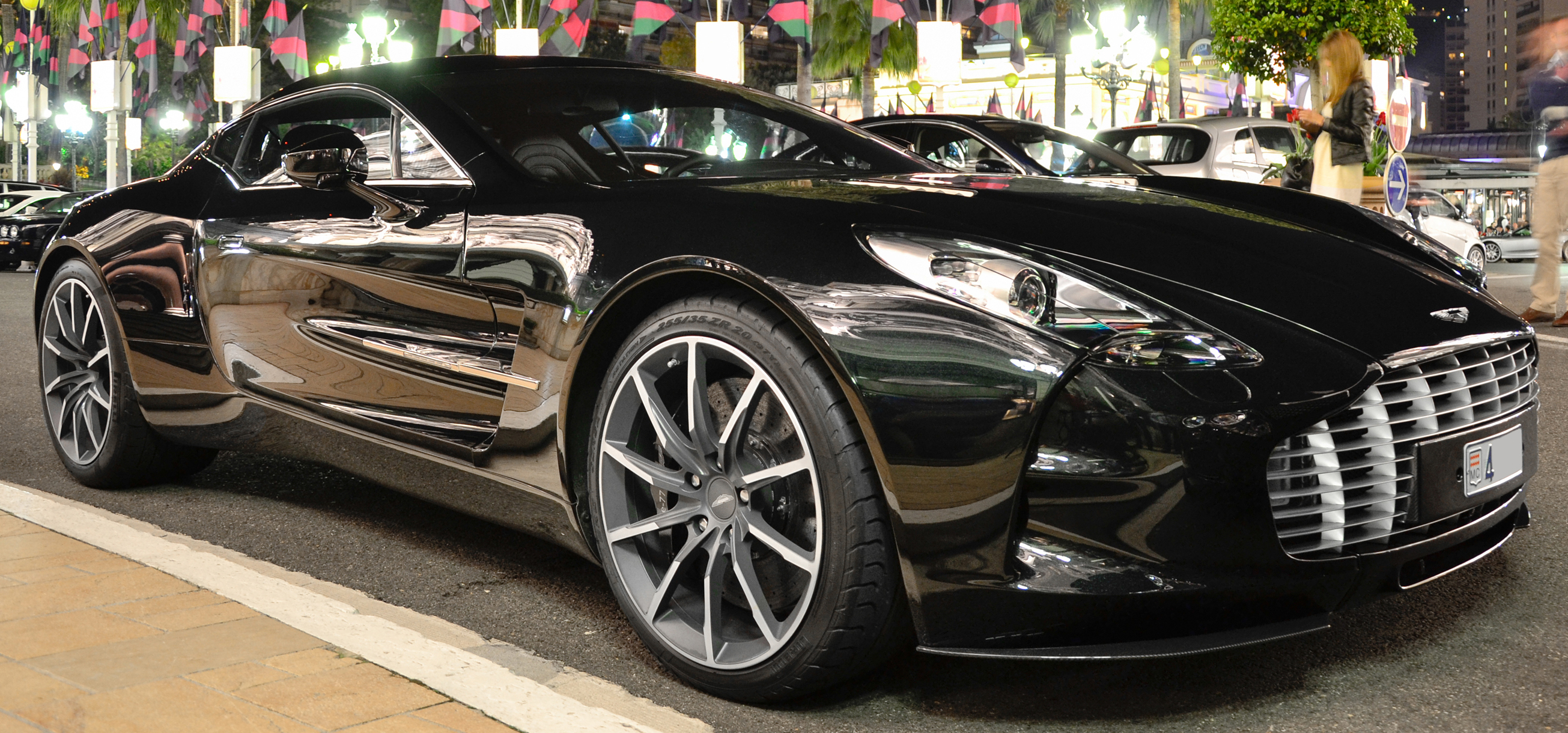
2009–2012 Aston Martin One-77

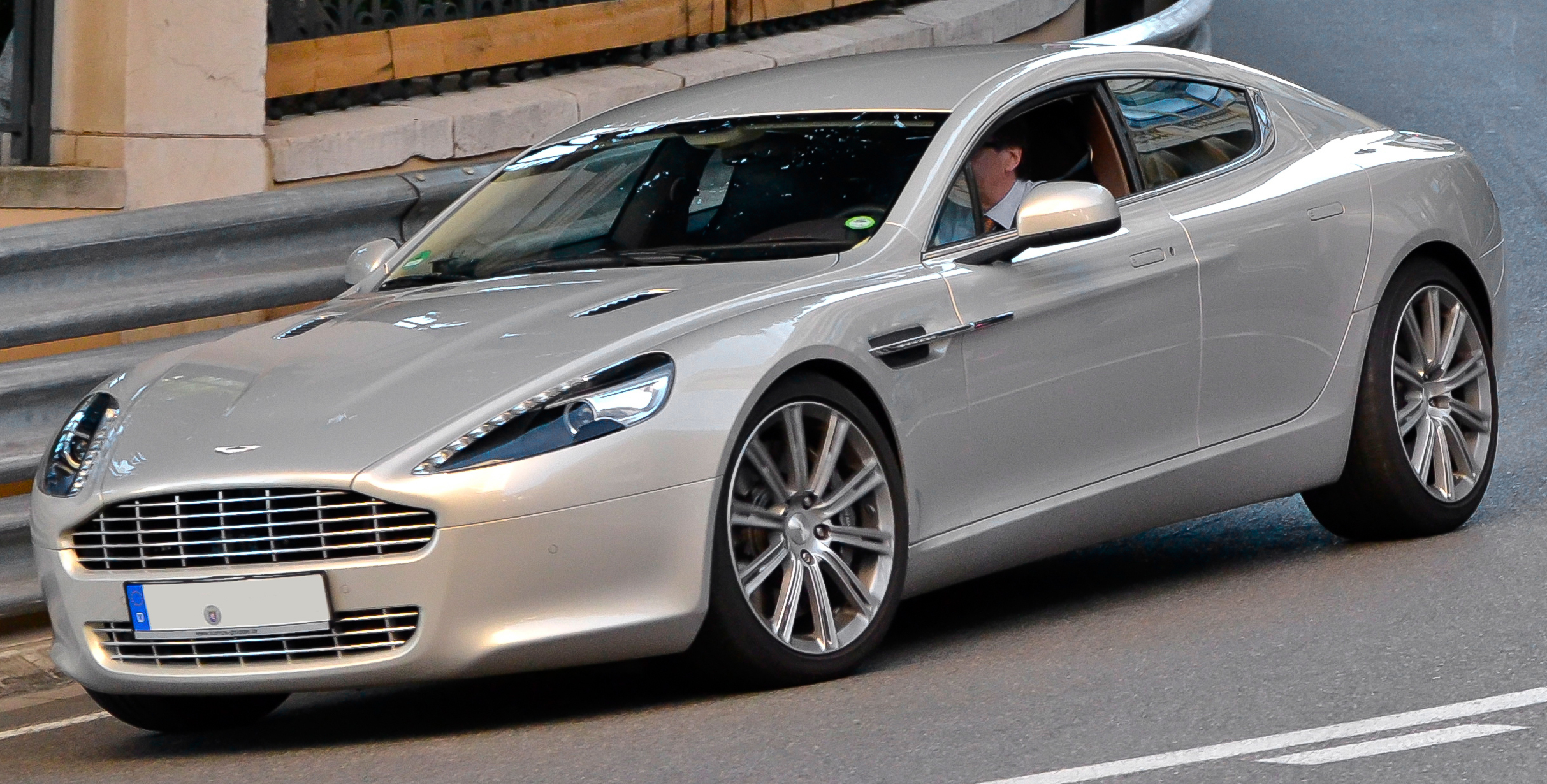
2010–2020 Aston Martin Rapide

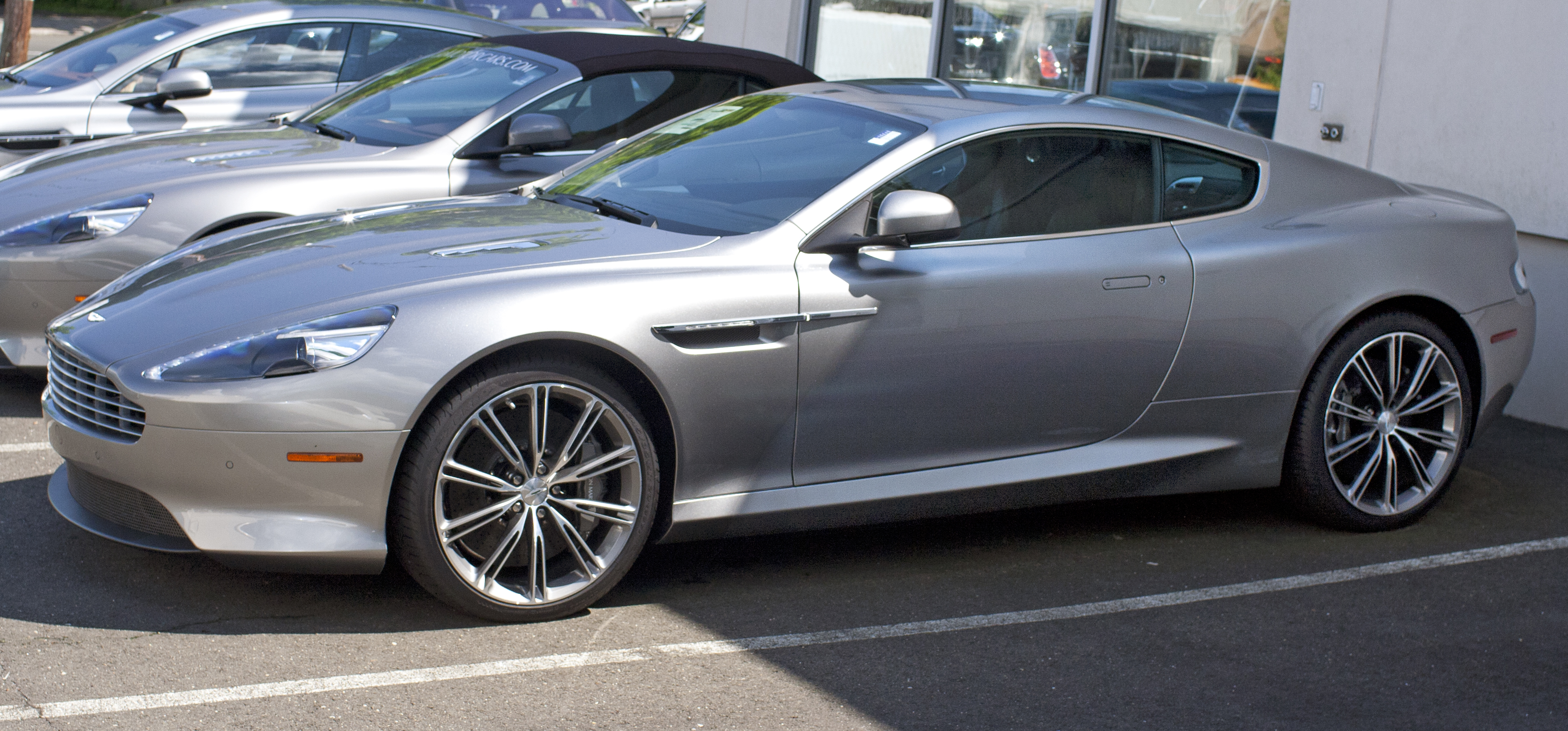
2011–2012 Aston Martin Virage

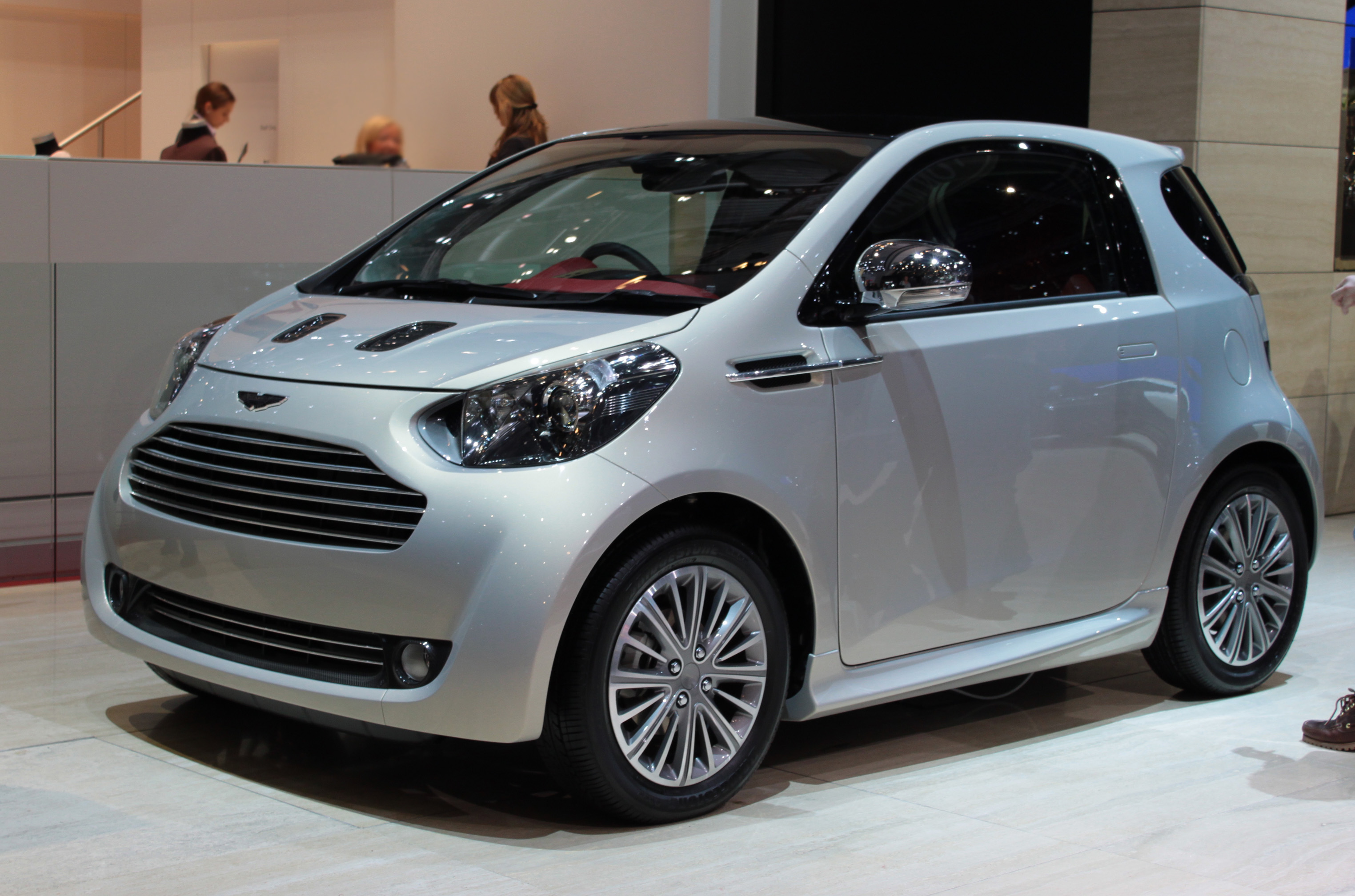
2011–2013 Aston Martin Cygnet

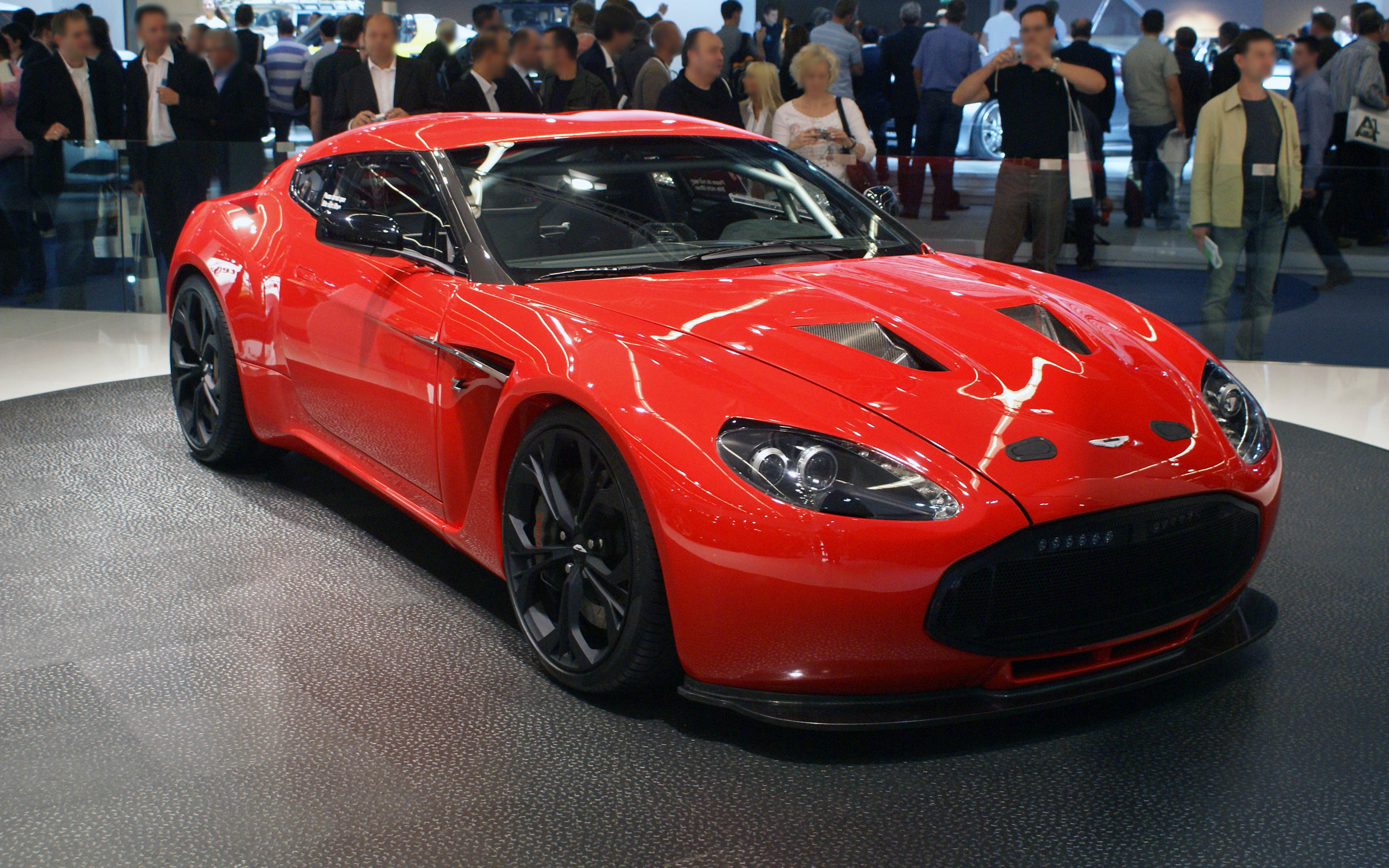
2012–2013 Aston Martin V12 Zagato

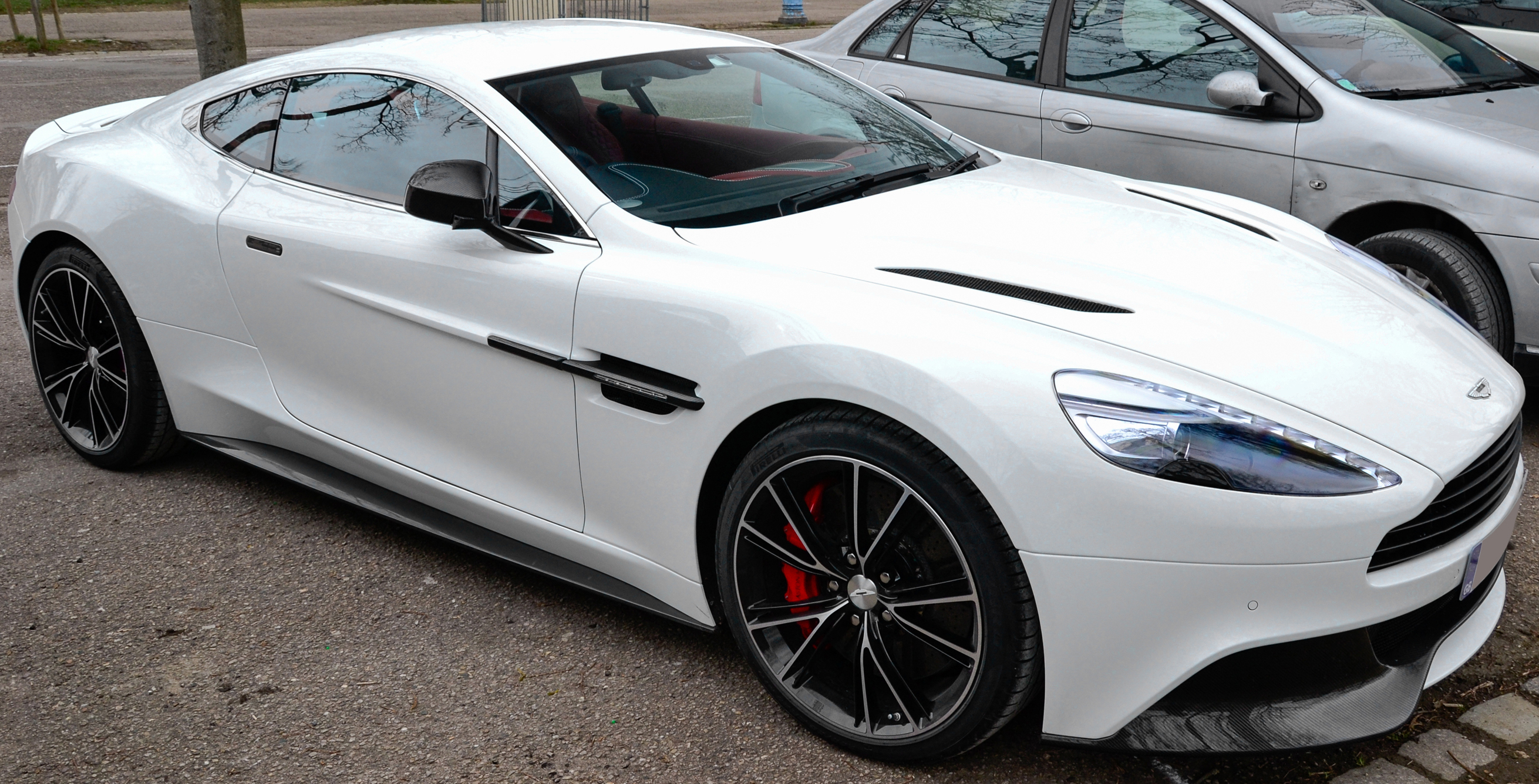
2012–2018 Aston Martin Vanquish

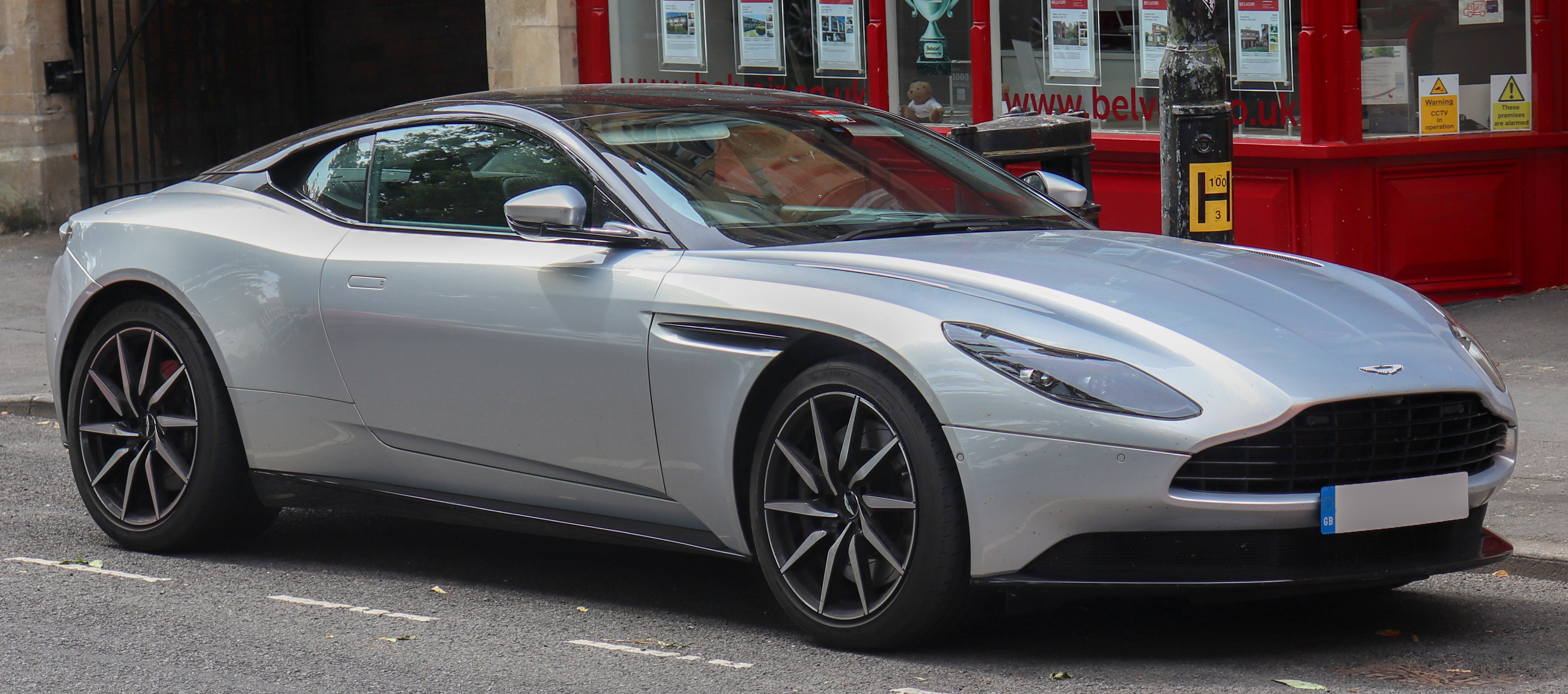
2016–2023 Aston Martin DB11

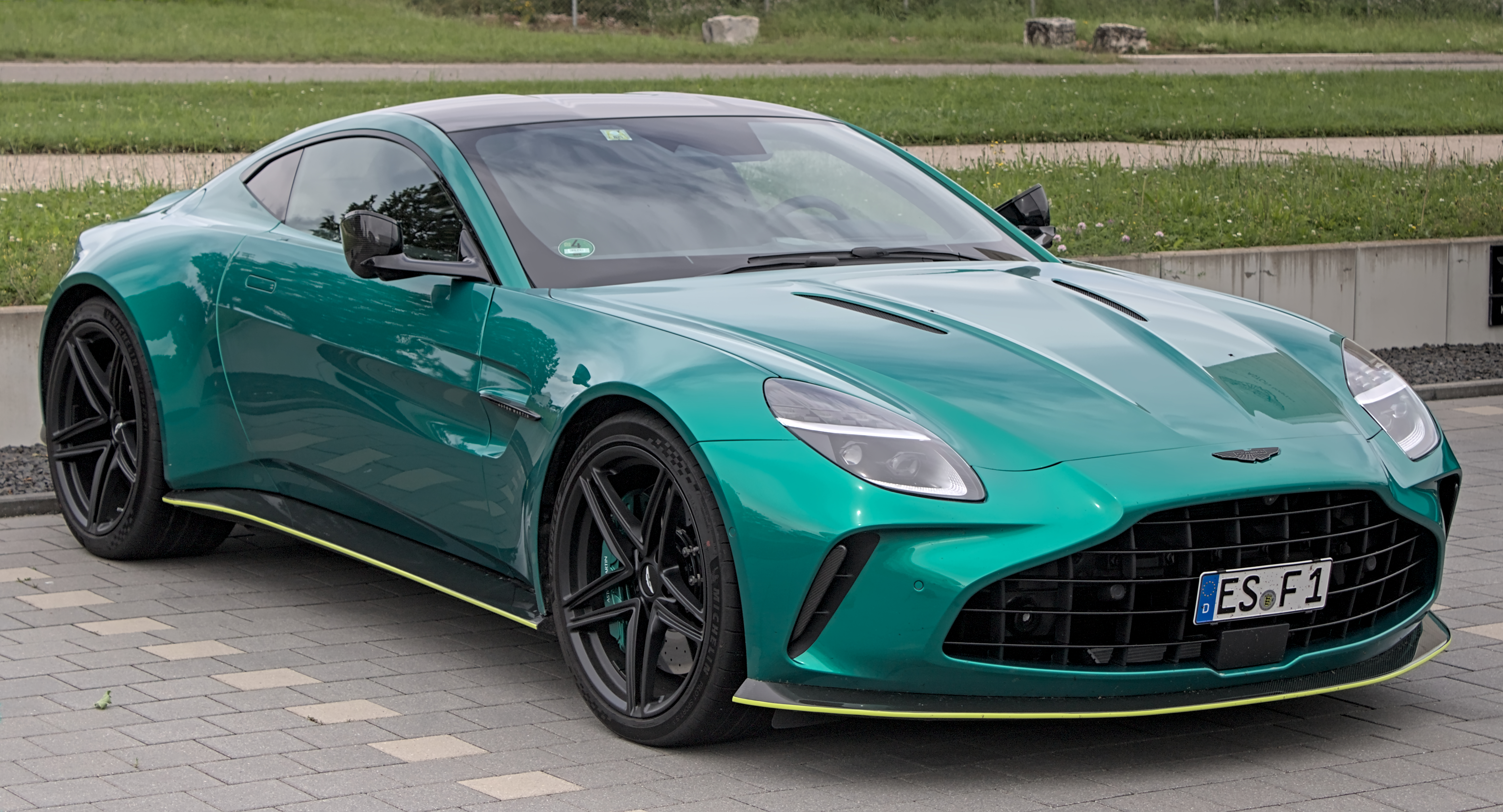
2018– Aston Martin Vantage

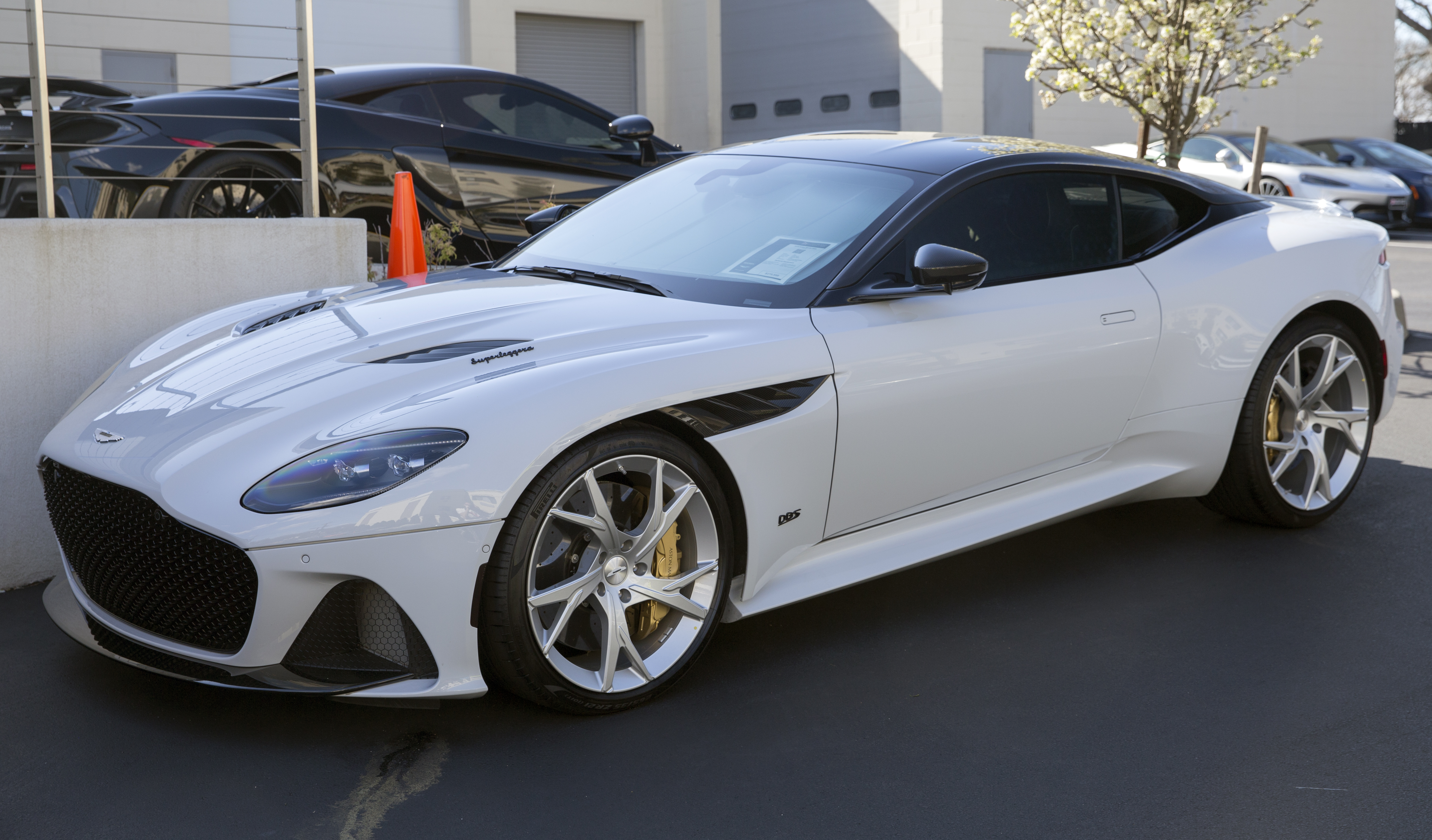
2018–2024 Aston Martin DBS Superleggera

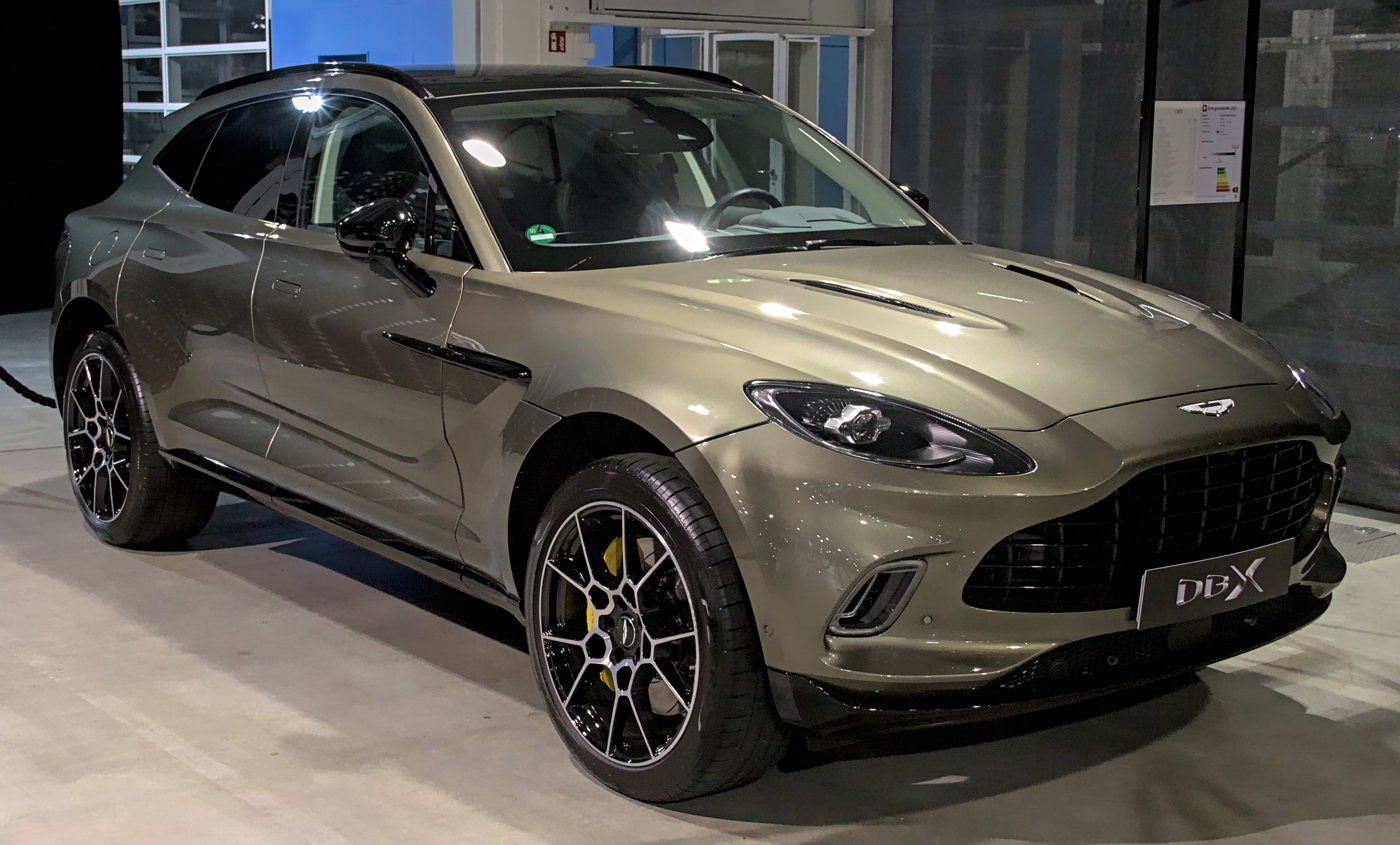
2020– Aston Martin DBX

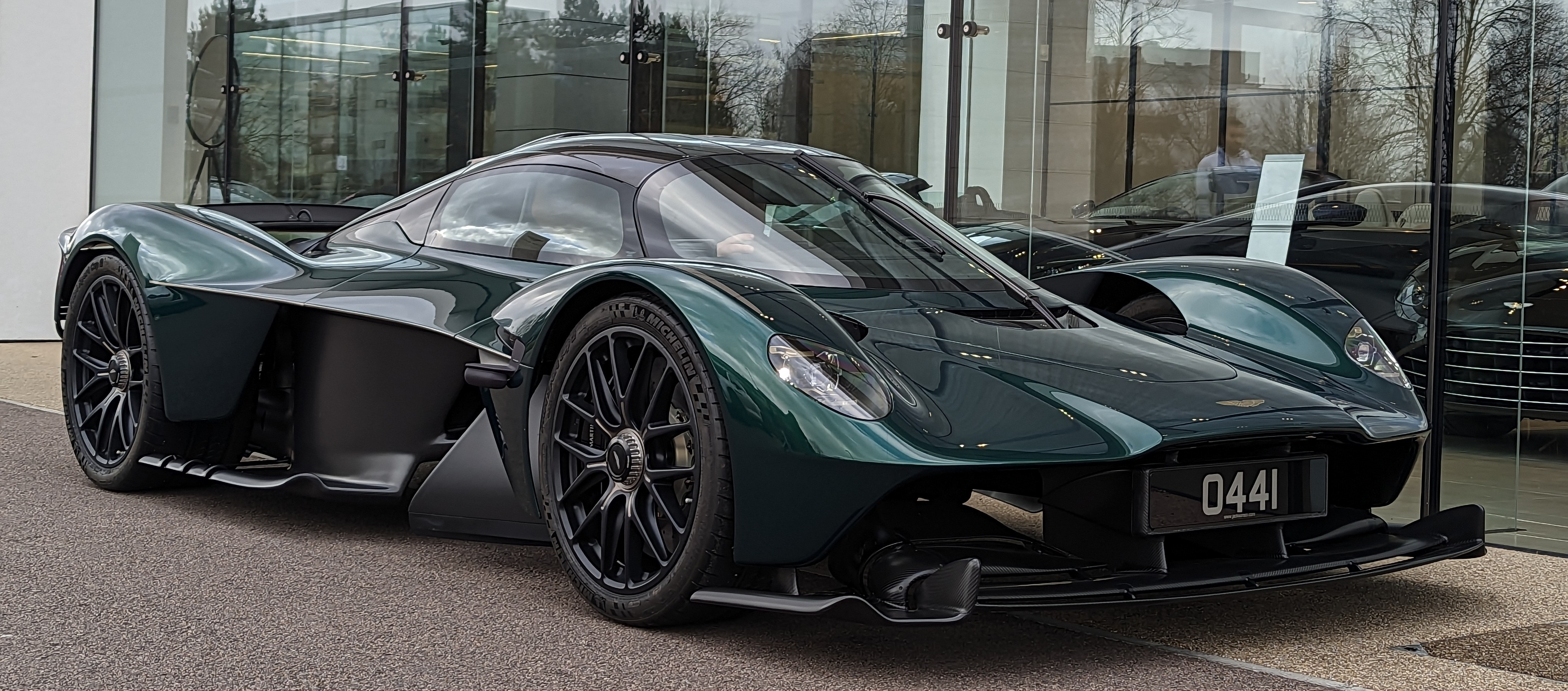
2021–2024 Aston Martin Valkyrie

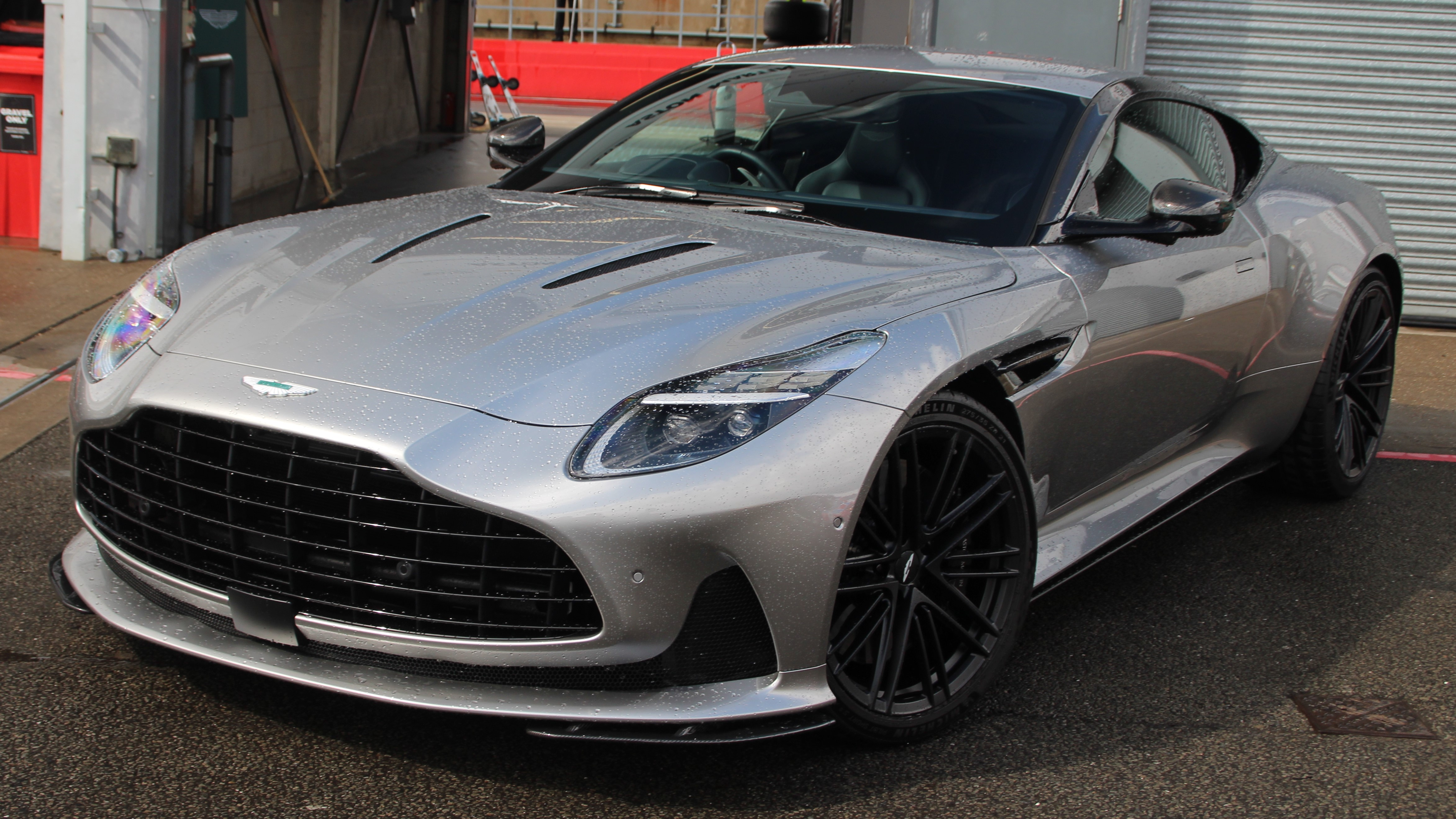
2023– Aston Martin DB12

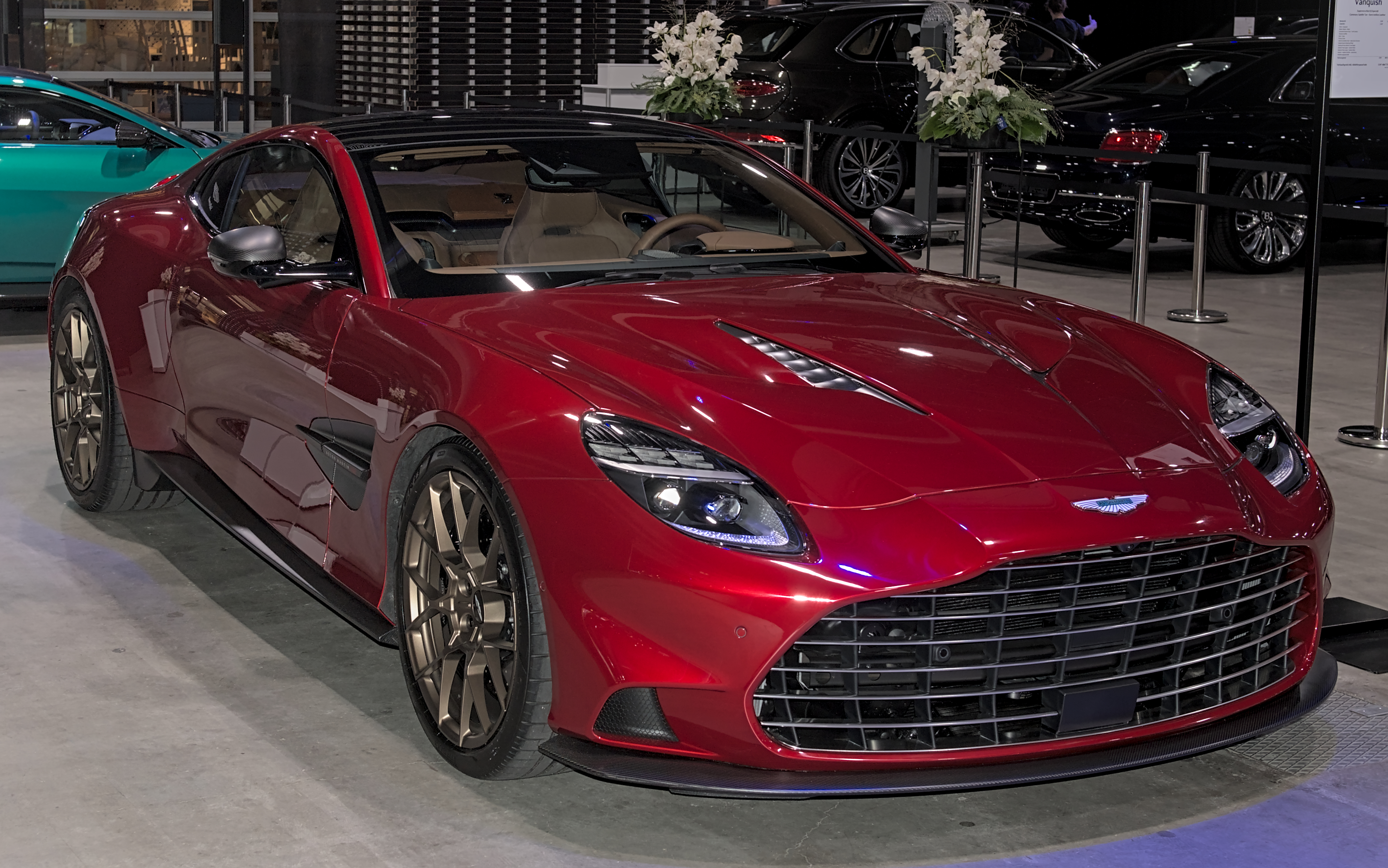
2024– Aston Martin Vanquish
