= Aston Martin Valour =

British sports car

Overview
- Manufacturer: Aston Martin
- Production: 2023–2024; Valour: 110 units; Valiant: 38 units
- Assembly: United Kingdom: Gaydon, Warwickshire

Body and chassis
- Class: Sports car (S)
- Body style: 2-door coupé
- Layout: Front mid-engine, rear-wheel-drive
- Doors: Swan
- Related: Aston Martin DB11; Aston Martin DB12; Aston Martin DBS (2018); Aston Martin Vantage (2018); Aston Martin Vanquish (2024)

Powertrain
- Engine: 5.2 L AE31 twin-turbo V12
- Transmission: 6-speed Graziano manual

Dimensions
- Wheelbase: 2,705 mm (106 in)
- Length: 4,599 mm (181 in)
- Width: 1,987 mm (78 in)
- Height: 1,274 mm (50 in)
- Curb weight: 1,780 kg (3,924 lb)

The Aston Martin Valour is a sports car produced by the British luxury carmaker Aston Martin. It was first presented in July 2023. The production is limited to 110 examples, to celebrate the carmaker's 110th anniversary.

== Design ==
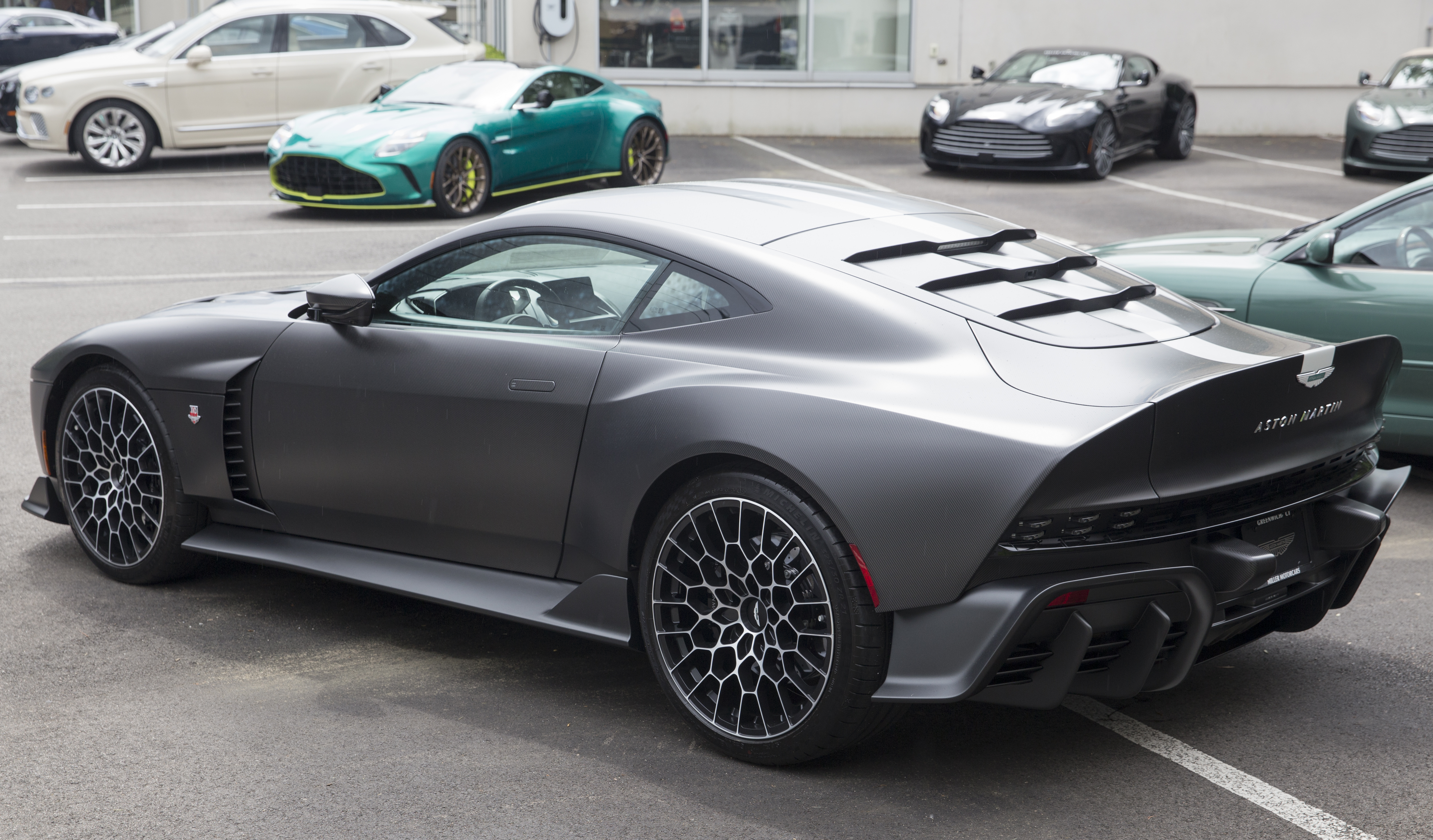
Rear view

The Valour has a 5.2-litre twin-turbo V12 engine based on that of the 2018 DBS. The Valour has the same philosophy and design as the Victor, which is also inspired by the 1977 V8 Vantage, but they do not share a direct platform. The Valour rides on a platform developed from the 2018 Vantage and DBS, with an aluminium chassis and a 5.2-litre twin-turbo V12 engine producing 705 bhp (526 kW; 715 PS) and 753 N⋅m (555 lb⋅ft) of torque, mated to a 6-speed manual transmission made by Graziano. The Victor, on the other hand, is a one-off vehicle based on the One-77, with a carbon fibre monocoque chassis and the One-77’s 7.3-litre naturally aspirated V12 engine refined by Cosworth to produce 836 bhp (623 kW; 848 PS) and 822 N⋅m (606 lb⋅ft) of torque, which is also paired with a 6-speed manual transmission made by the Italian company. So, while both have retro designs and are limited-run, the Victor is based on the One-77 and the track-only Vulcan, while the Valour is closer to the DBS and Vantage.

== Aston Martin Valiant ==
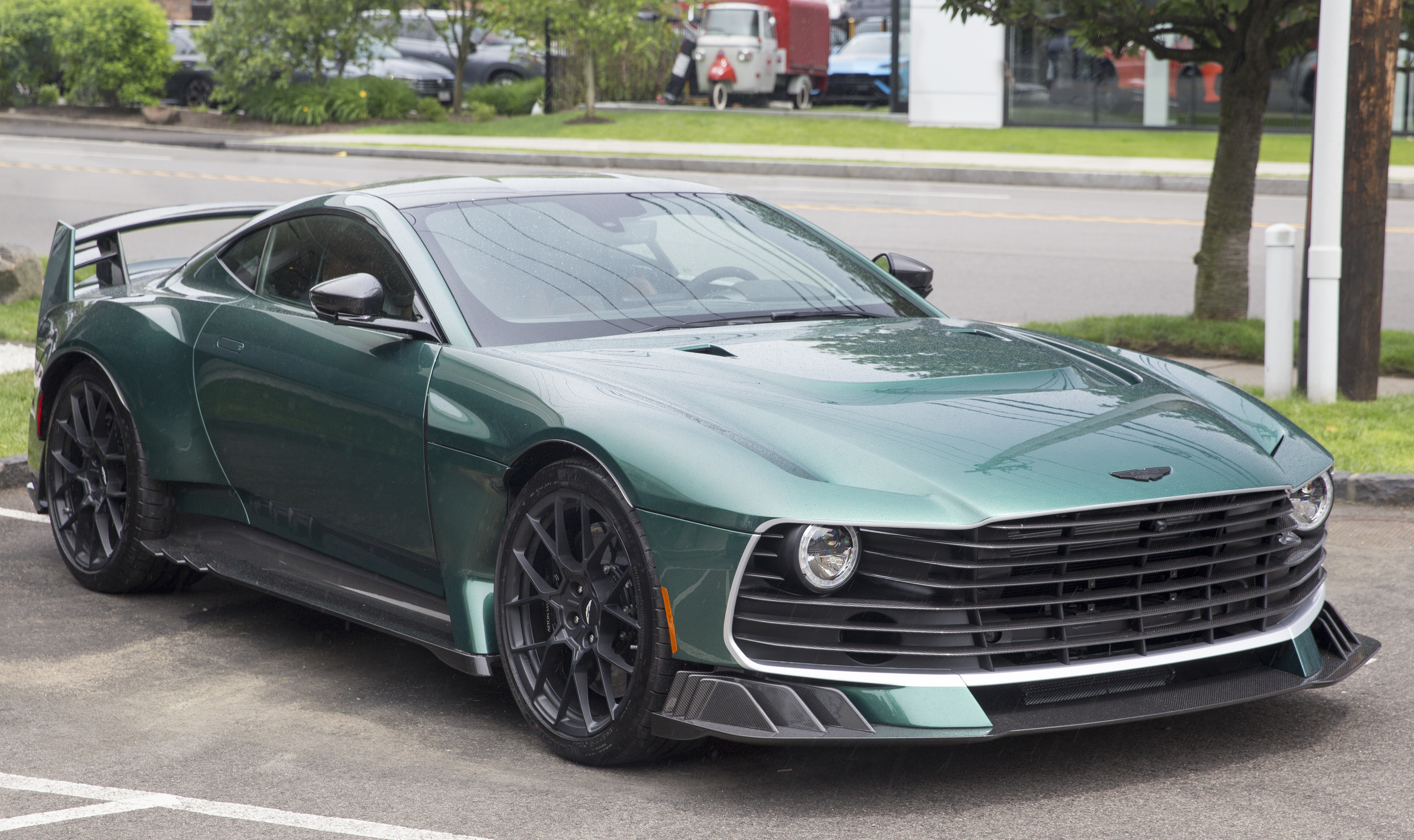

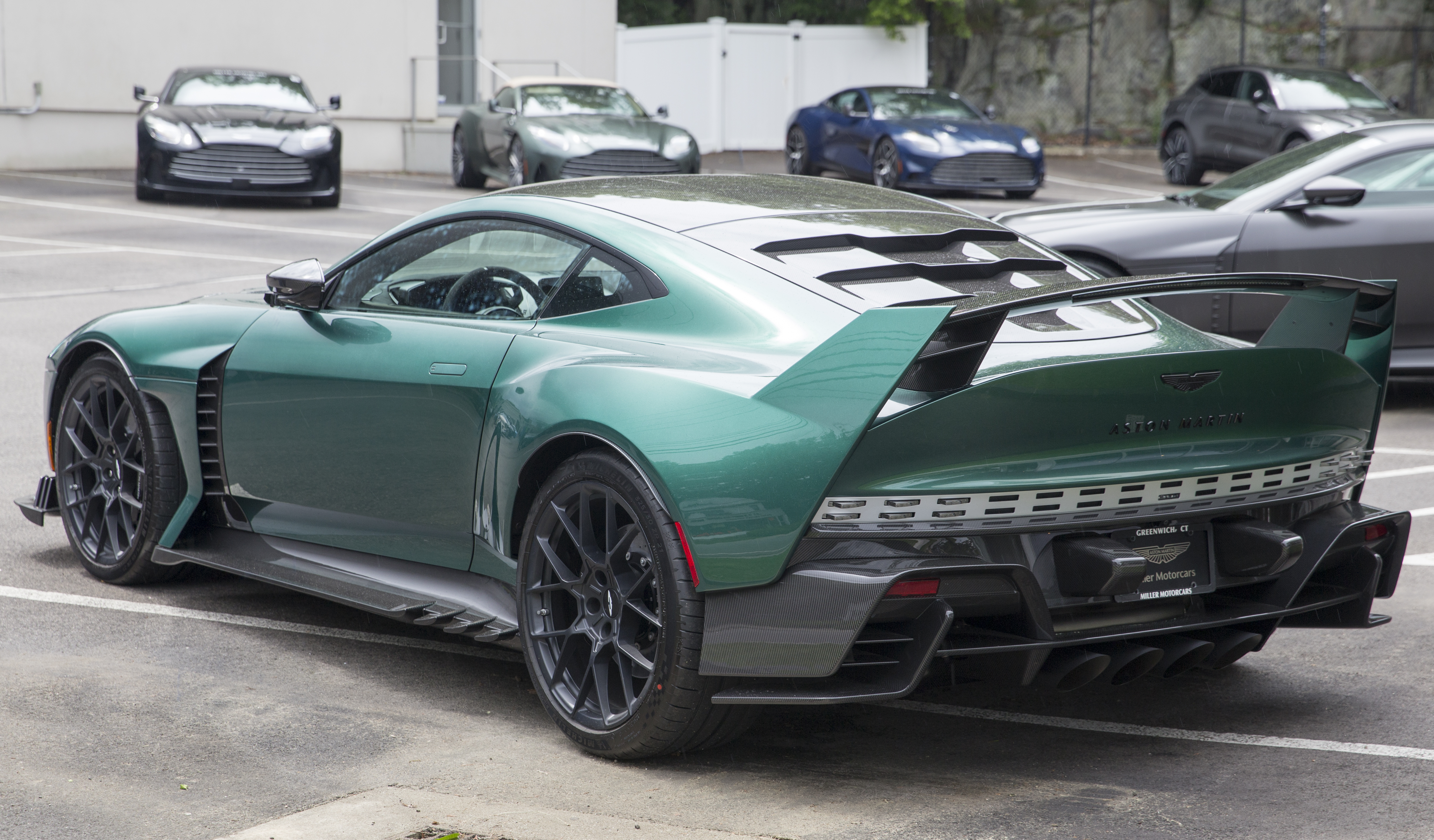
Aston Martin Valiant

Aston Martin introduced a road legal, track-focused version of the Valour named the Valiant at the 2024 Goodwood Festival of Speed. The car was originally conceived from a personal commission from Aston Martin Formula One driver Fernando Alonso, for a one-off, lightweight track-focused version of the Valour. However, Aston Martin decided to produce the limited edition sports car in 38 units.

The Valiant is powered by the same 5.2-litre twin-turbo V12 engine, with output increased to 735 bhp (548 kW; 745 PS), but with the same 753 N⋅m (555 lb⋅ft) of torque. It also retained the 6-speed Graziano manual transmission. The bodywork is all-carbon fibre with more aggressive aerodynamic, increases the downforce to 383 kg (844 lb). For further weight reduction, the Valiant was reengineered with the use of magnesium wheels, 1980 RHAM/1 '‘Muncher’'-inspired carbon fibre aero wheel covers, titanium quad exhaust and torque tube, lightweight lithium-ion battery, 3D printed rear subframe and stripped-back steering wheel. The handling is also reworked by the use of carbon ceramic disc brake, the adoption of roll cage and motorsport-level Multimatic Adaptive Spool Valve (ASV) dampers.

== Reception ==
Writing for the magazine Top Gear, Ollie Kew described the Valour as a "worthy successor to the Vantage V600 of the 1990s" that is "impossible to make a sensible case for, but laudable all the same just for existing".

== See also ==
- List of Aston Martin vehicles
