= Aston Martin Le Mans =

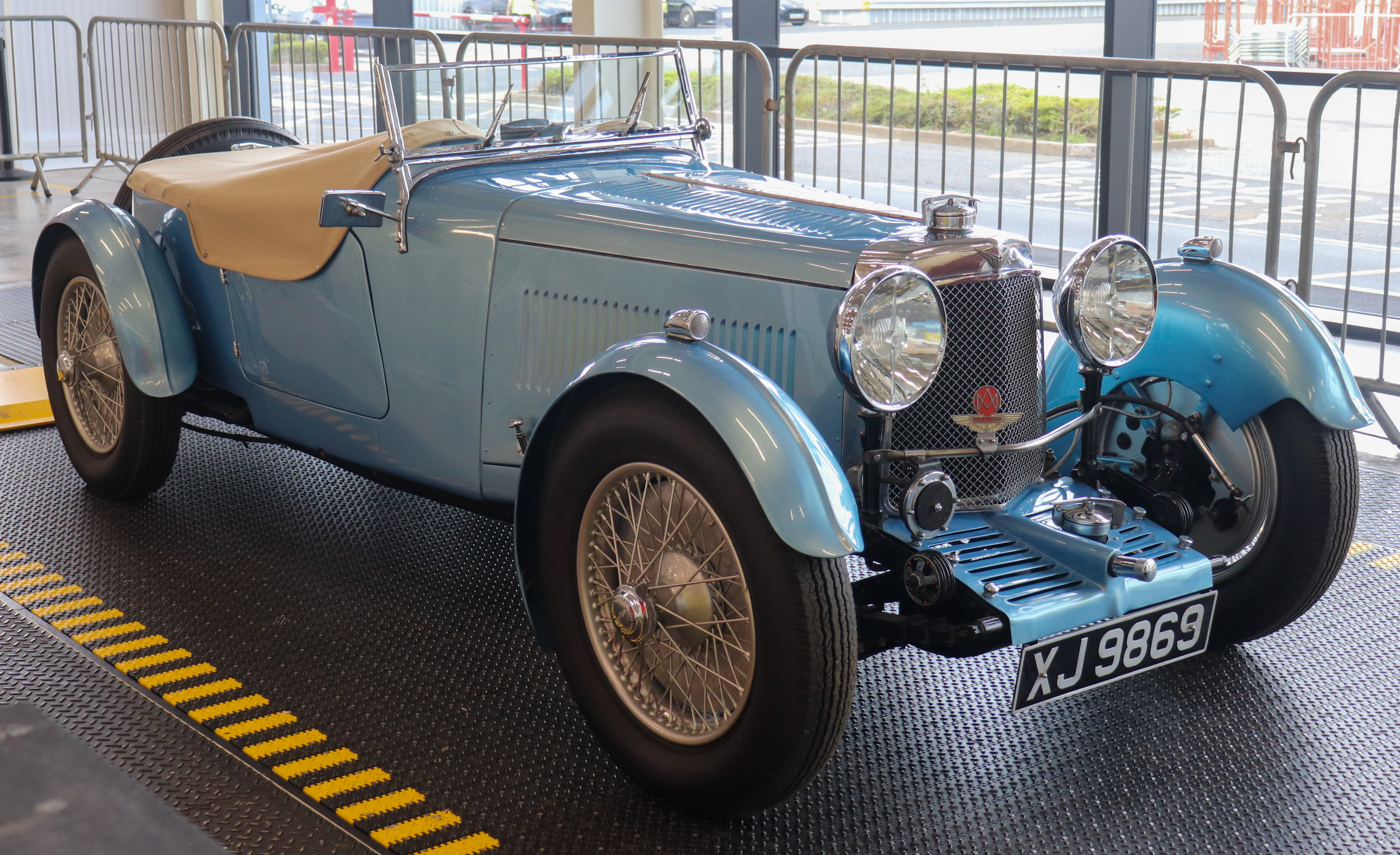
- 1933 Aston Martin Le Mans

Overview
- Manufacturer: Aston Martin
- Production: 1932–1934; 130 manufactured

Body and chassis
- Class: Sports car
- Body style: 2 seat open sports 4 seat open sports (from 1933)

Powertrain
- Engine: 1.5 L (1493 cc) Straight-4–cylinder single-overhead-cam, dry sump
- Transmission: 4-speed manual

Dimensions
- Kerb weight: 2,128 lb

Chronology
- Predecessor: Aston Martin International
- Successor: Aston Martin 12/50 Standard

The Aston Martin Le Mans is a two or four seat sports car made by Aston Martin between 1932 and 1934.

Aston Martin's single-overhead-cam engine with a Bore/Stroke of 69.3 mm x 99 mm, had first been seen in the 1927 models, was highly efficient and now had an output of 70 brake horsepower (52 kW) at 4750 rpm from 1.5 litres, an outstanding development by early 1930s standards. Twin Horizontal SU carburettors were fitted. The aluminium body was mounted on a separate steel chassis which had beam axles front and rear with semi-elliptic leaf springs. 4-Wheel drum brakes, mechanically operated at the rear, and by cable at the front were used.

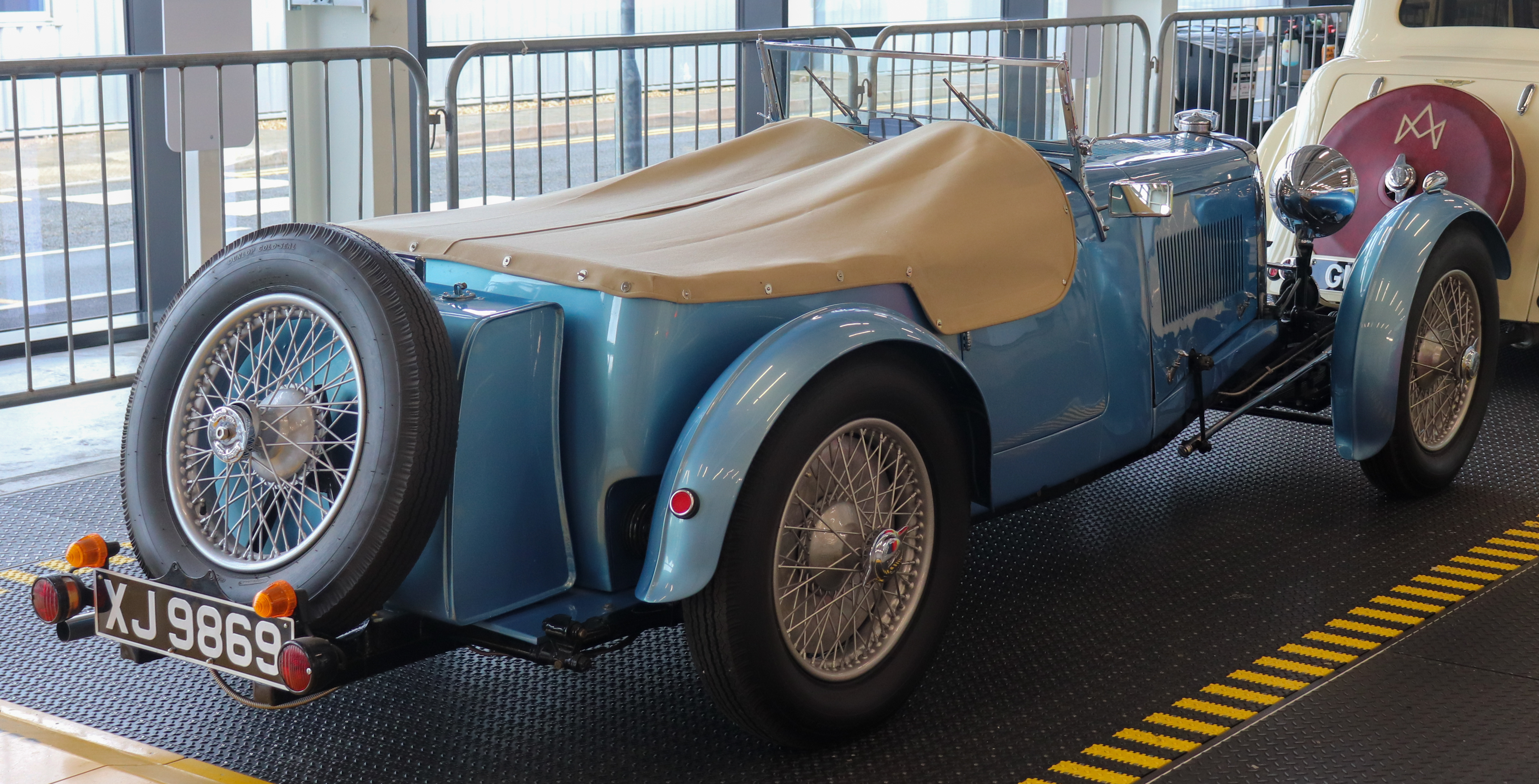
1933 Aston Martin Le Mans rear

During 1932 the Aston Martin International Le Mans had slowly sold at £650; the 1933 Aston Martin Le Mans model retailed at £595, thereby increasing the chance of the car selling faster.

Aston Martin, encouraged by the car's reception, began to offer alternative wheelbase lengths: 102 inches/2591 mm or 120 inches/3048 mm and a choice of open two-seater or four-seater bodywork. The cars were long, low and immediately recognisable by their unique radiator style. Aston Martin made the cars exclusive; between 1932 and 1933, only 130 were produced.

According to the standards of the early 1930s, Aston Le Mans were speedy cars – compared to the pace of the MG and Singer- with a top speed in the region of 85 mph (137 km/h) and acceleration from 0–50 mph (0–80 km/h) in 16 seconds.
