= Aston Martin Vantage (2018) =

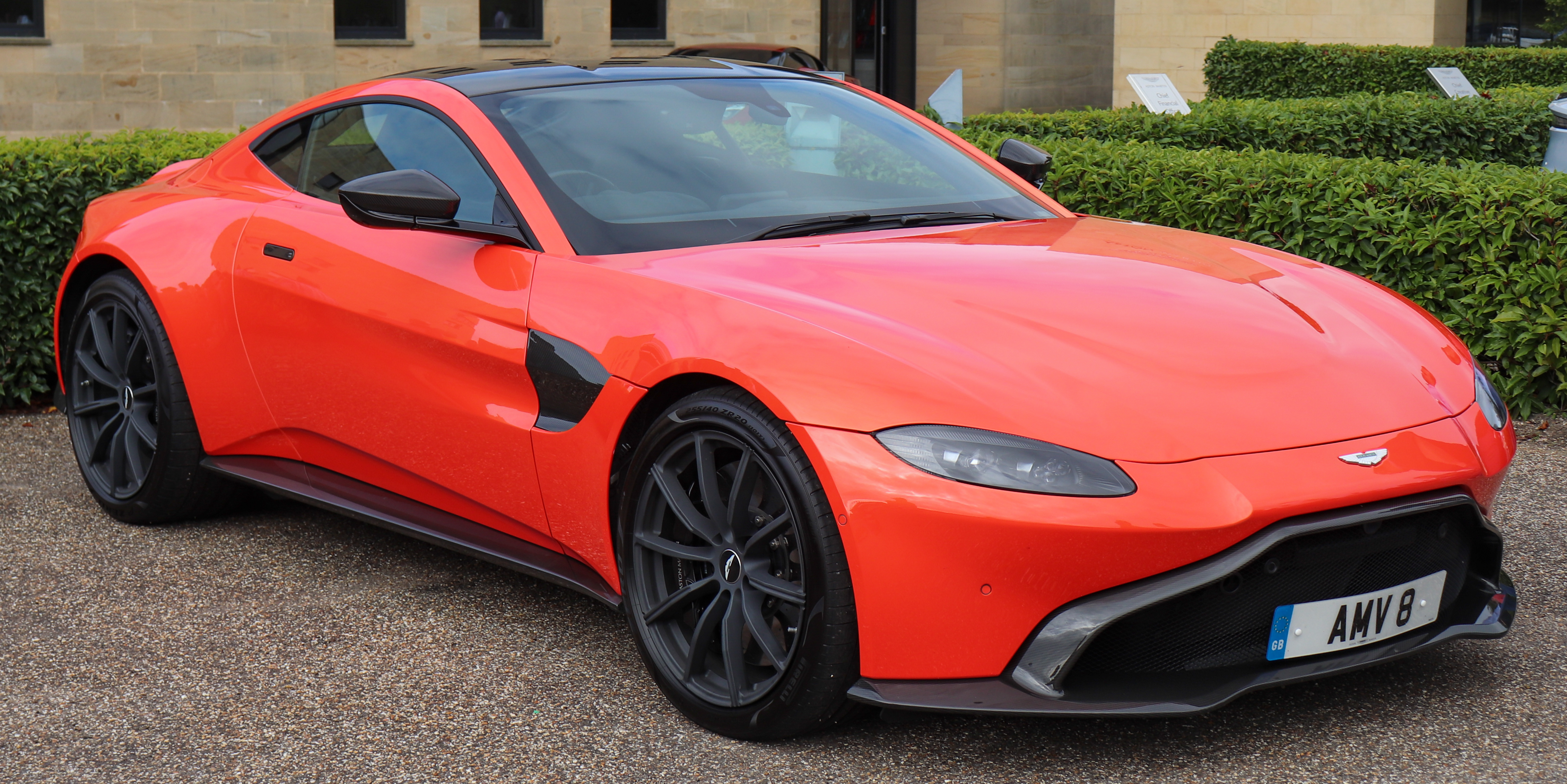

Overview
- Manufacturer: Aston Martin
- Model code: AM6
- Production: 2018–present
- Assembly: United Kingdom: Gaydon, Warwickshire
- Designer: Marek Reichman

Body and chassis
- Class: Sports car (S)
- Body style: 2-door coupé; 2-door convertible; 2-door speedster (V12 Speedster)
- Layout: Front mid-engine, rear-wheel-drive
- Doors: Swan
- Related: Aston Martin DB10; Aston Martin DB11; Aston Martin DB12; Aston Martin DBS Superleggera; Aston Martin DBX; Mercedes-AMG GT

Powertrain
- Engine: 4.0 L Mercedes-AMG M177 twin-turbocharged V8; 5.2 L Aston Martin AE31 twin-turbocharged V12
- Transmission: 7-speed Graziano manual; 8-speed ZF 8HP75 automatic

Dimensions
- Wheelbase: 2,705 mm (106.5 in)
- Length: 4,465 mm (175.8 in)
- Width: 1,943 mm (76.5 in)
- Height: 1,272 mm (50.1 in)
- Kerb weight: 1,630 kg (3,594 lb) (2018 Coupe); 1,690 kg (3,726 lb) (2020 Roadster); 1,700 kg (3,748 lb) (2024 Coupe); 1,760 kg (3,880 lb) (2025 Roadster)

Chronology
- Predecessor: Aston Martin Vantage (2005)

The Aston Martin Vantage is a two-seater sports car built by British manufacturer Aston Martin since 2018. It replaced the previous model Vantage of 2005 which had been in production for 12 years.

== Models ==
=== V8 Vantage (2018–2023) ===
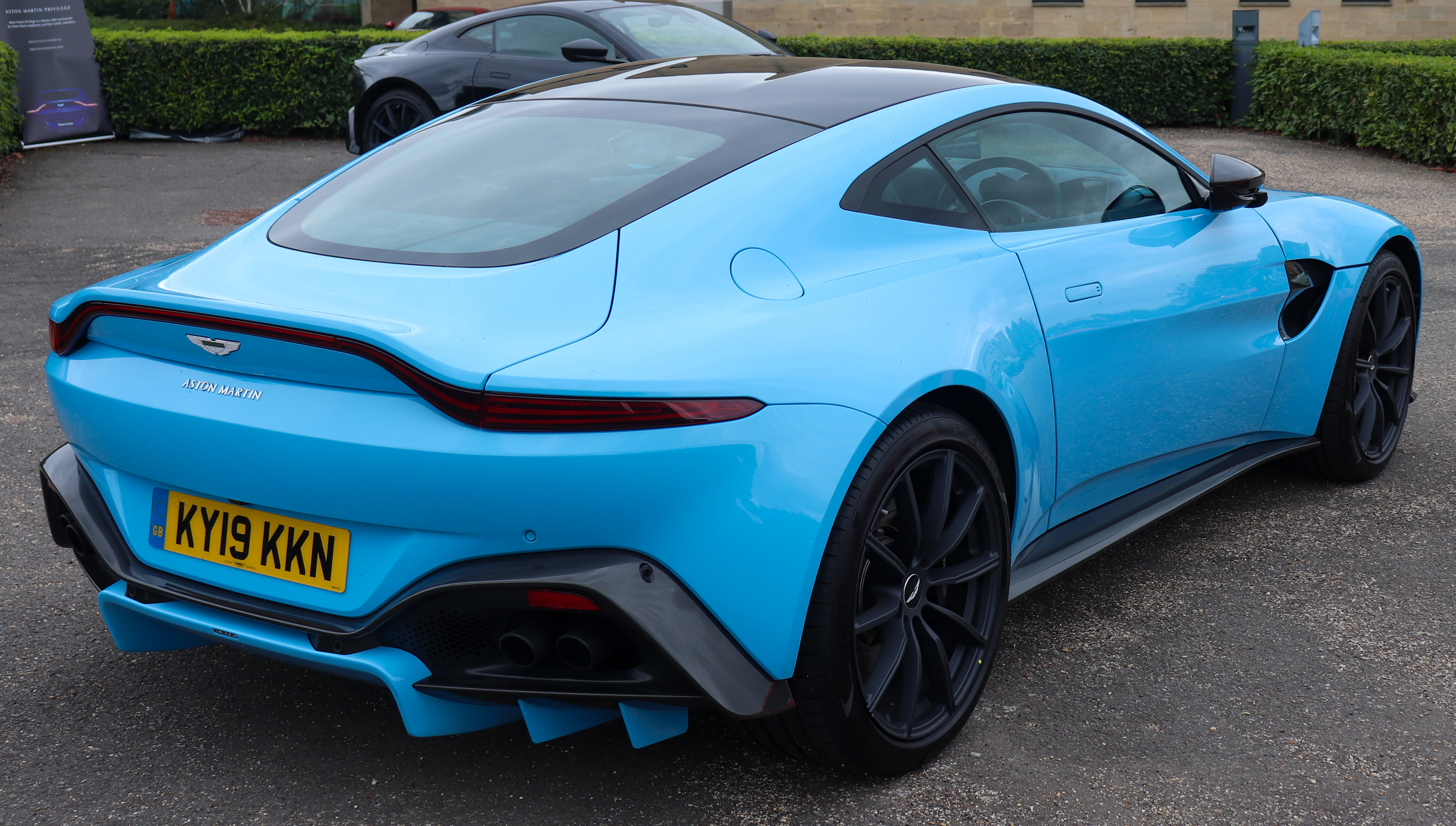
Rear view

The Vantage V8 Coupe was unveiled on 21 November 2017. Deliveries began in June 2018. The Vantage uses powertrain and infotainment technology from Mercedes-Benz, like the DB11. The Vantage uses Mercedes-AMG's M177, 4.0-litre twin-turbocharged V8 engine that has a power output of 510 PS (375 kW; 503 hp) and 505 lb⋅ft (685 N⋅m) of torque as is equipped with the Mercedes COMAND system. The Vantage V8 is capable of accelerating from 0–100 km/h (0–62 mph) in 3.6 seconds, and attaining a top speed of 314 km/h (195 mph).

The Vantage uses a rear-mounted 8-speed automatic gearbox manufactured by ZF Friedrichshafen, and will be the only vehicle that pairs the Mercedes-AMG V8 with a manual transmission when the combination is made available. The engine is positioned as far back within the chassis as possible, and a 50/50 front/rear weight distribution has been achieved with the car. The Vantage is also the first Aston Martin production car to feature an electronically controlled differential with torque vectoring, and is built around the same all-new bonded-aluminium platform as the DB11, although around 70% of its components are said to be unique to the Vantage. The car has a dry weight of 1,530 kg (3,373 lb).

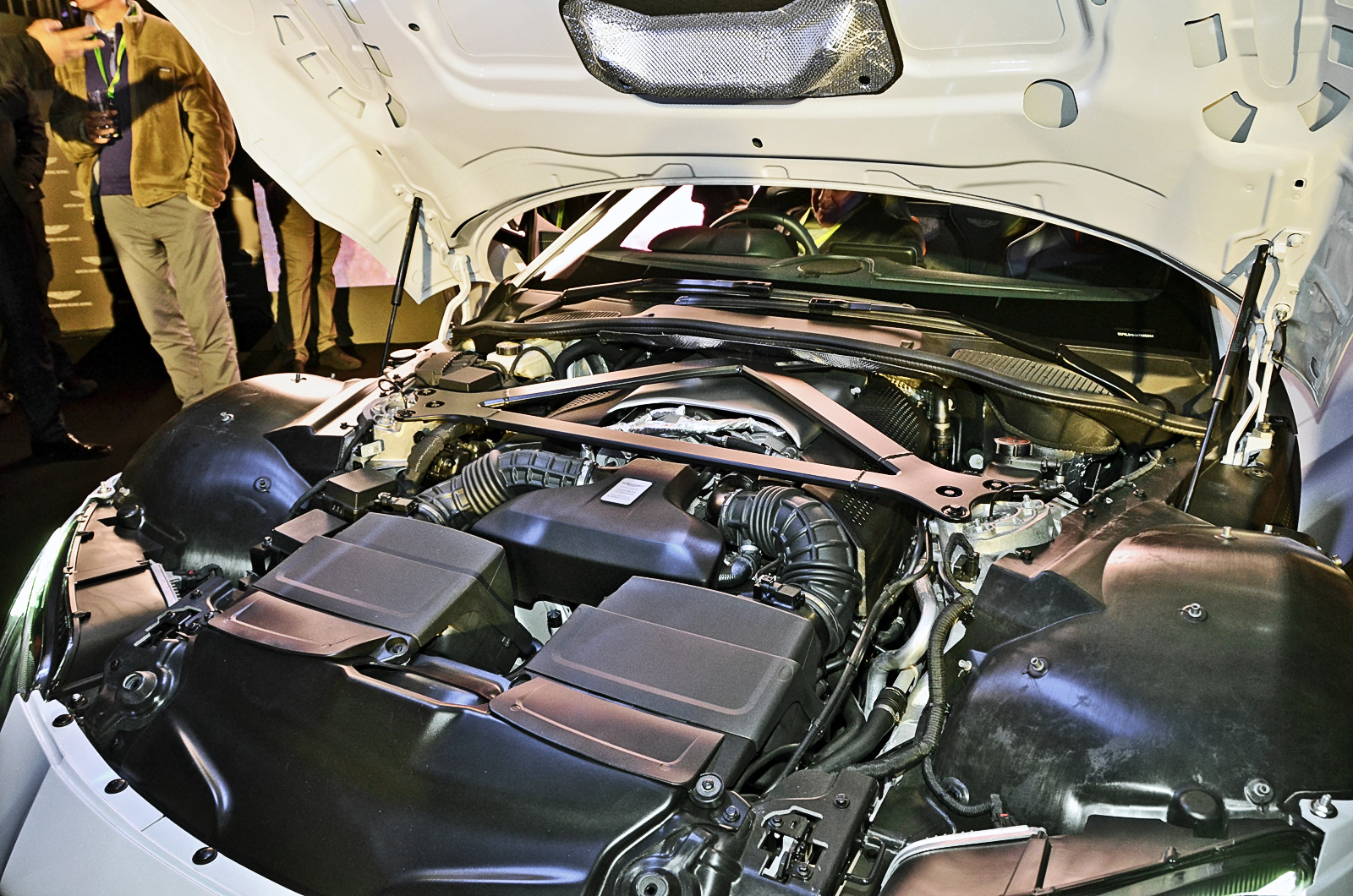
The M177 twin-turbocharged V8 engine

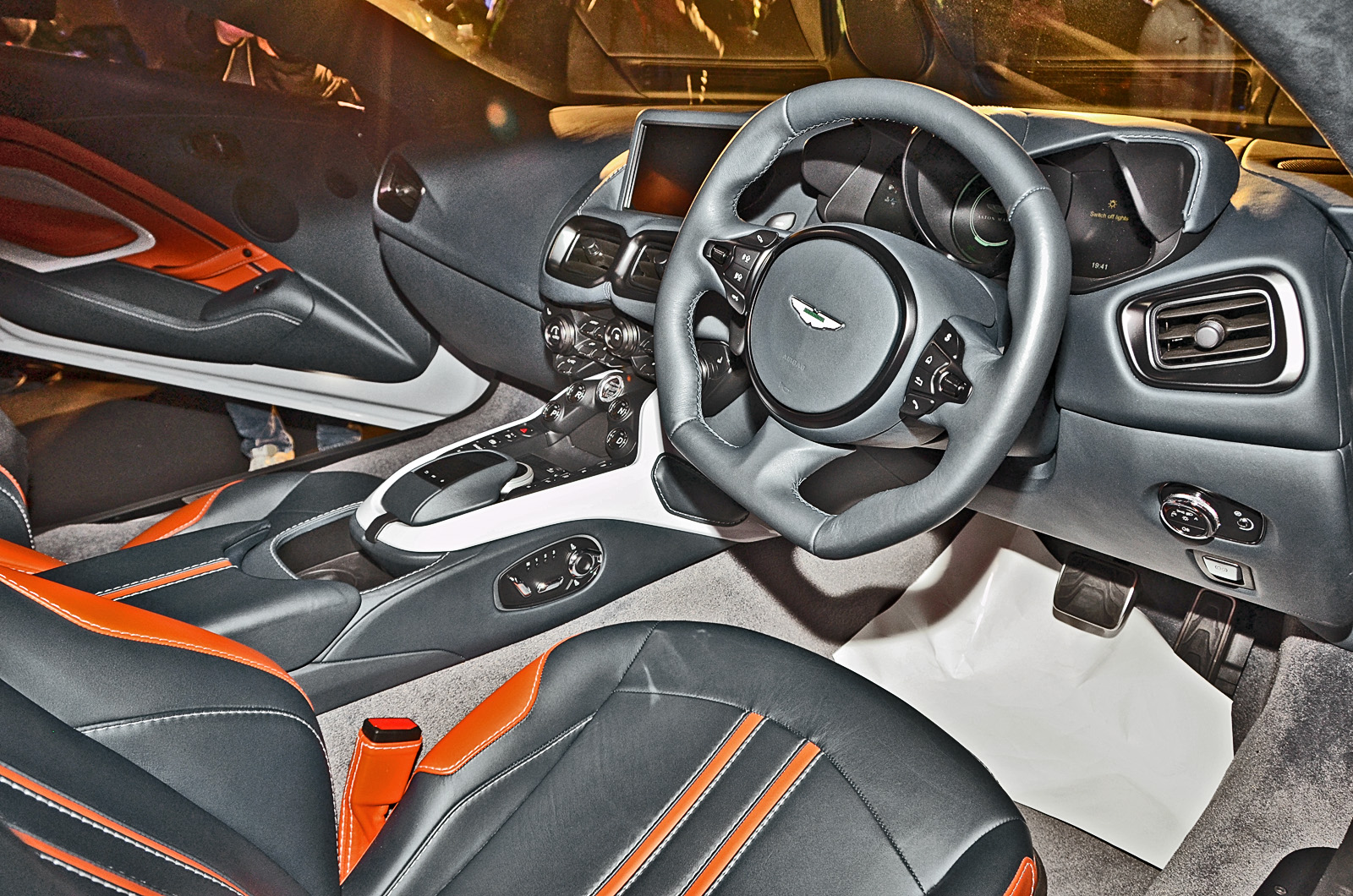
Interior

The design of the Vantage is inspired by the track-only Vulcan and the purpose made DB10 that appeared in the James Bond film Spectre. The front grille, specifically inspired by the Vulcan, helps in efficient engine cooling. For purposes of weight saving, the Vantage forfeits the passenger glove compartment and maintains a simple centre console design.

=== V8 Vantage AMR ===
Appearing in 2019, the Vantage AMR is a track-focused variant of the Vantage. The main highlight of the model is the replacement of the ZF 8-speed automatic transmission with a dog-leg Graziano Trasmissioni 7-speed manual transmission previously used on the V12 Vantage S. The AMR also comes with a driver-selectable AMSHIFT system which controls the throttle during gear shifting. A new limited-slip differential ensures linear delivery of power. The power-band of the engine is wider and the unit is designed to deliver 625 N⋅m (461 lb⋅ft) of torque from 2,000 rpm to 5,000 rpm. The use of a manual transmission and carbon-ceramic brakes reduce the weight by 95 kg (209 lb). New adaptive dampers with the section of Sport, Sport + and Track modes improve handling. Performance figures include a 0–97 km/h (60 mph) acceleration time of 3.9 seconds, half a second less than the standard Vantage while the top speed remains the same as the standard model. Visual changes include 20-inch forged wheels as available on the Rapide AMR, new carbon fibre side vents and cooling vents present on the bonnet a sports exhaust system with quad tailpipes and racing bucket seats.

Production of the AMR will be limited to 200 units worldwide. Available exterior colours for the AMR include Sabiro Blue, Onyx Black, China Grey and White Stone. The final 59 cars will be finished in a Stirling Green exterior colour with Lime accents and will pay homage to the 1959 24 Hours of LeMans victory of Aston Martin. Once the production of the AMR ceases, the 7-speed manual transmission will become available on the standard Vantage.

=== V8 Vantage Roadster ===
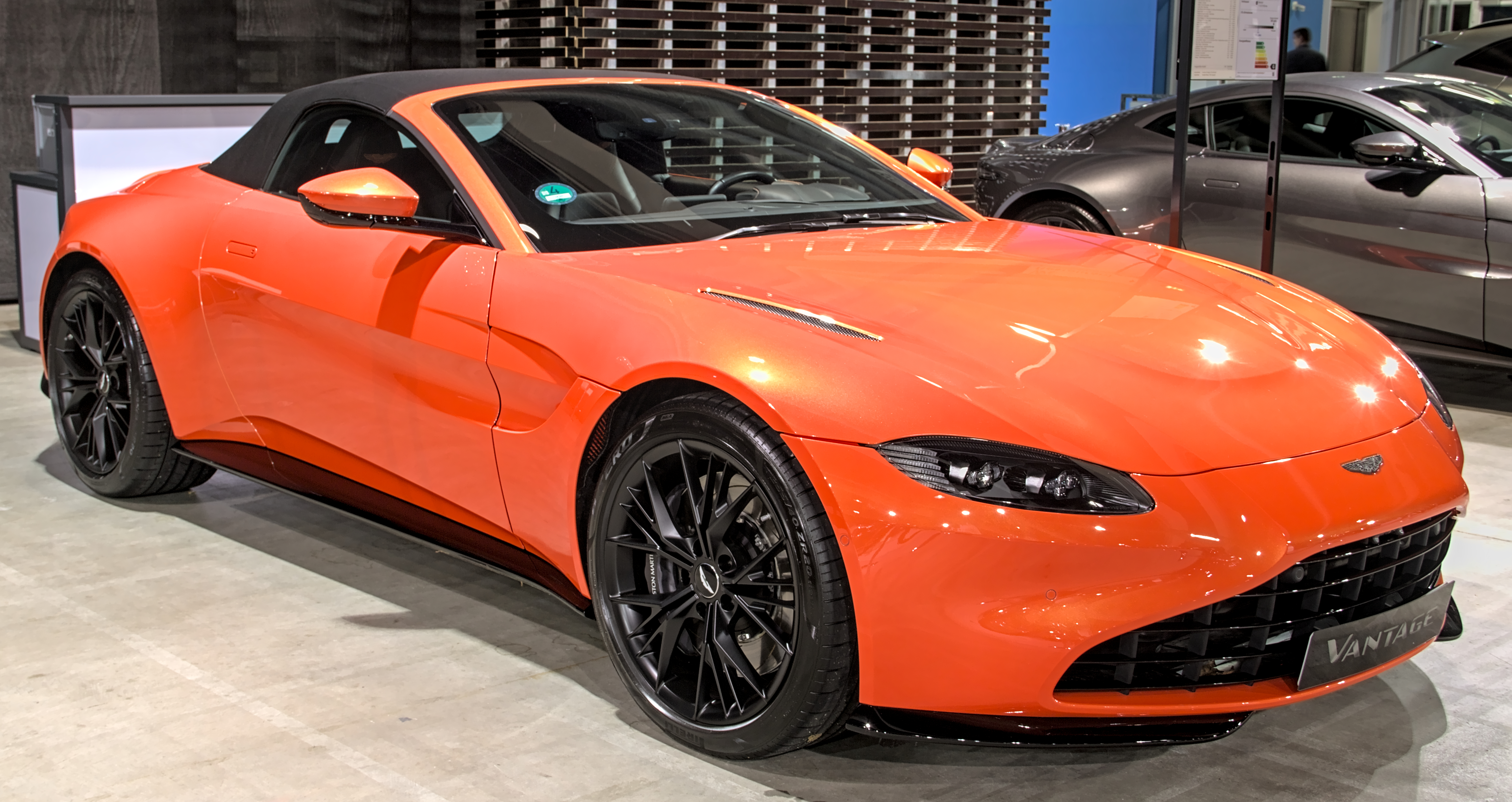
Vantage Roadster

Revealed in February 2020, the Vantage Roadster is a convertible version of the V8 Coupe with a fabric roof. The roof, claimed to be the fastest of any automotive automatic convertible system, takes 6.7 seconds to lower and 6.8 seconds to raise and can be operated at speeds of up to 50 km/h (31 mph). The Vantage Roadster has a dry weight of 1,628 kg (3,589 lb).

=== V8 Vantage 007 Edition ===
The 007 Edition is a version of the V8 Coupe commemorating the film No Time to Die. Inspired by the Aston Martin V8 Vantage from the 1987 James Bond film The Living Daylights, the Vantage 007 Edition comes equipped with a unique mesh grille and chrome bezel, as well as Cumberland Grey exterior paint over an obsidian black leather interior. Production is limited to 100 units.

=== V12 Speedster ===
In March 2020, Aston Martin introduced the V12 Speedster, a production car inspired by the DBR1 of the late 1950s and the 2013 CC100 Speedster concept. Aston Martin produced 88 units at a base price of $950,000. It uses a 5.2-litre twin turbo V12 based on the one from the DBS Superleggera but with less power and torque. The engine sends its power to a ZF 8-speed gearbox. It can accelerate from 0–100 km/h (62 mph) in 3.5 seconds and has a top speed of 300 km/h (186 mph). It has 21-inch forged, centre-locking wheels, carbon ceramic brakes and adaptive dampers. It uses a version of the Vantage roadster's bonded aluminium chassis, along with most of the front-end structure of the DBS Superleggera grafted on to accommodate the larger size of its V12. It has pods behind the seats that are sized to transport helmets and a removable leather bag where the glovebox would normally be.

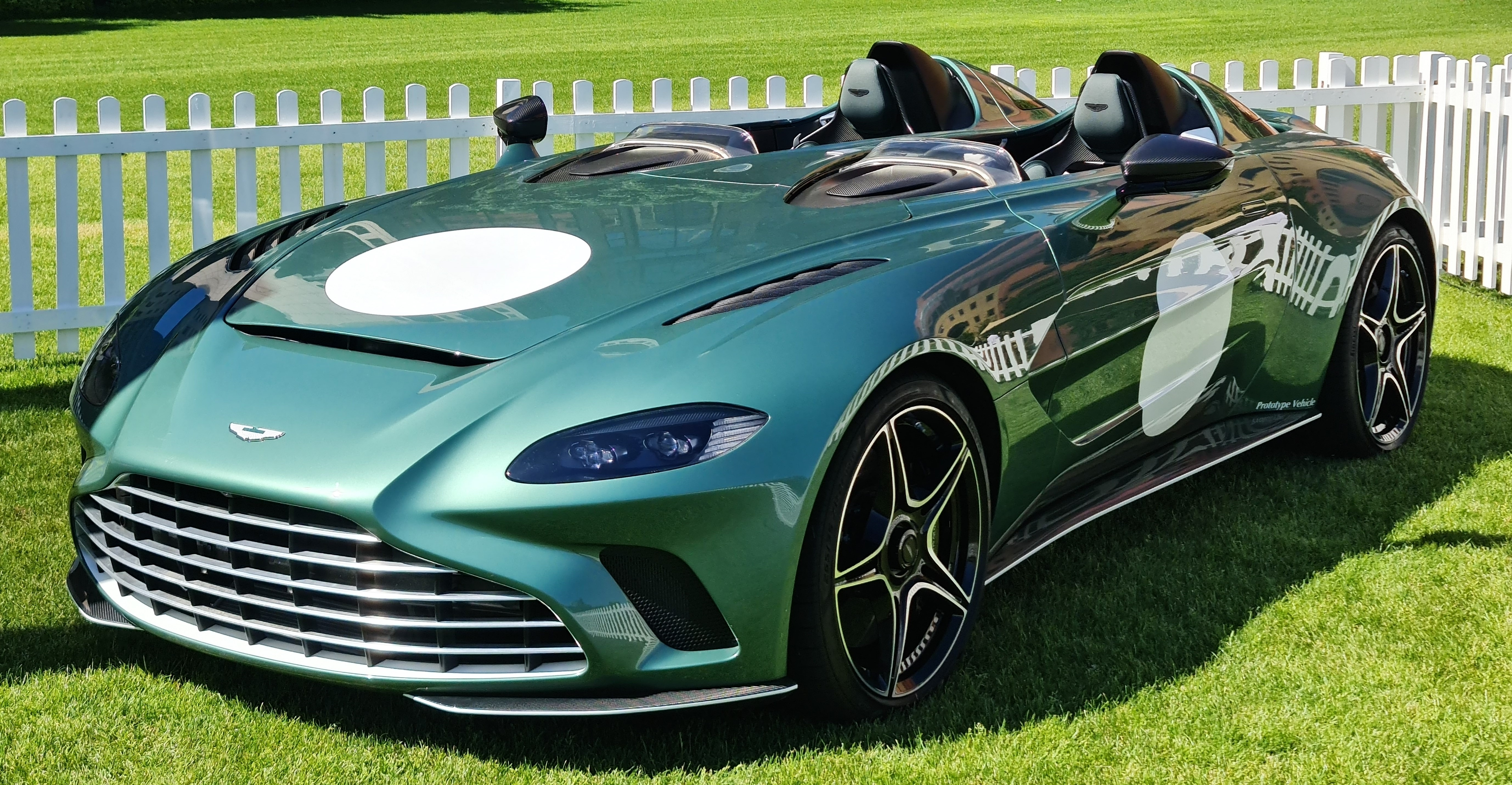
V12 Speedster

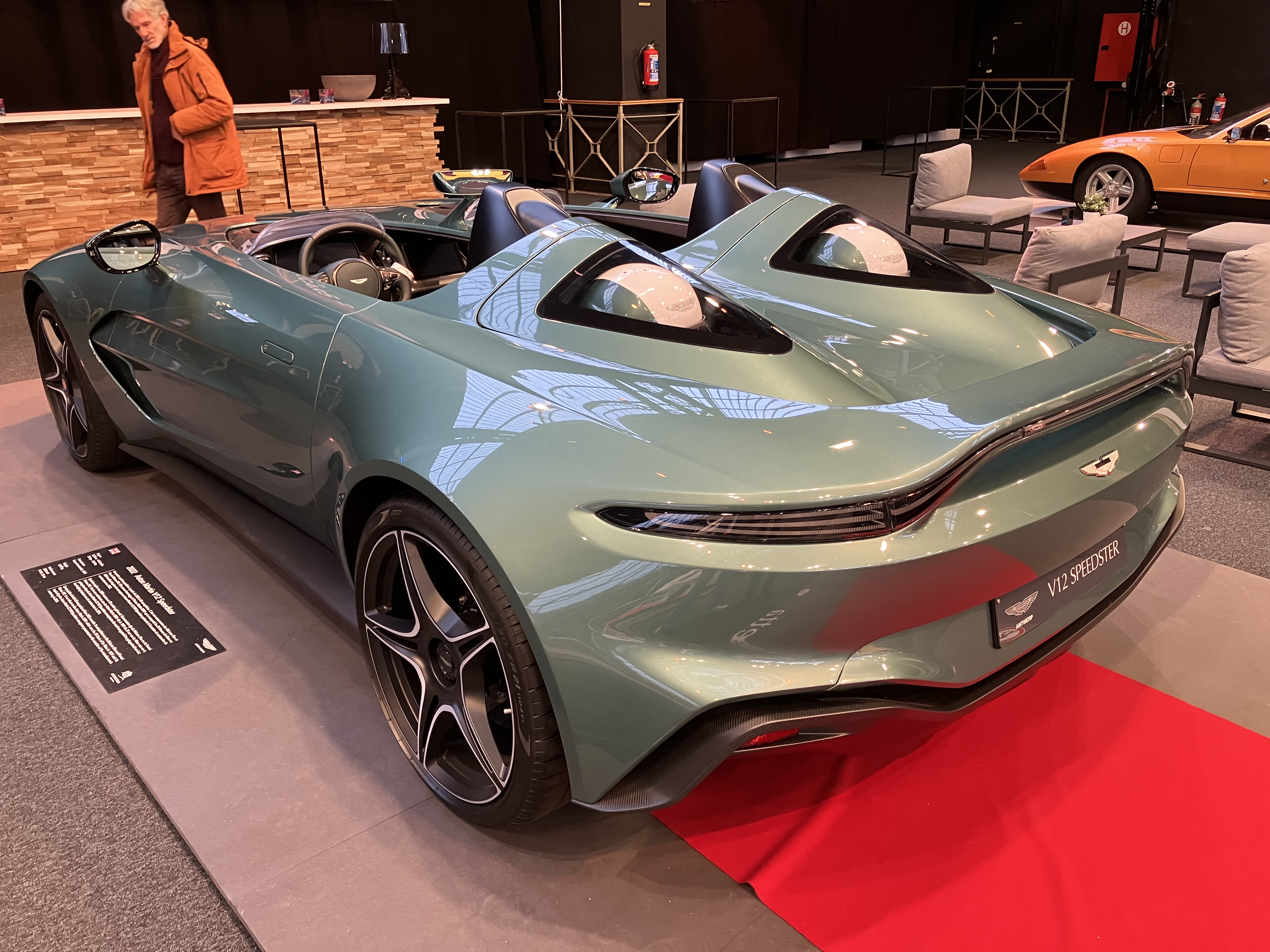
Rear of V12 Speedster showing the helmet pods

=== F1 Safety Car ===
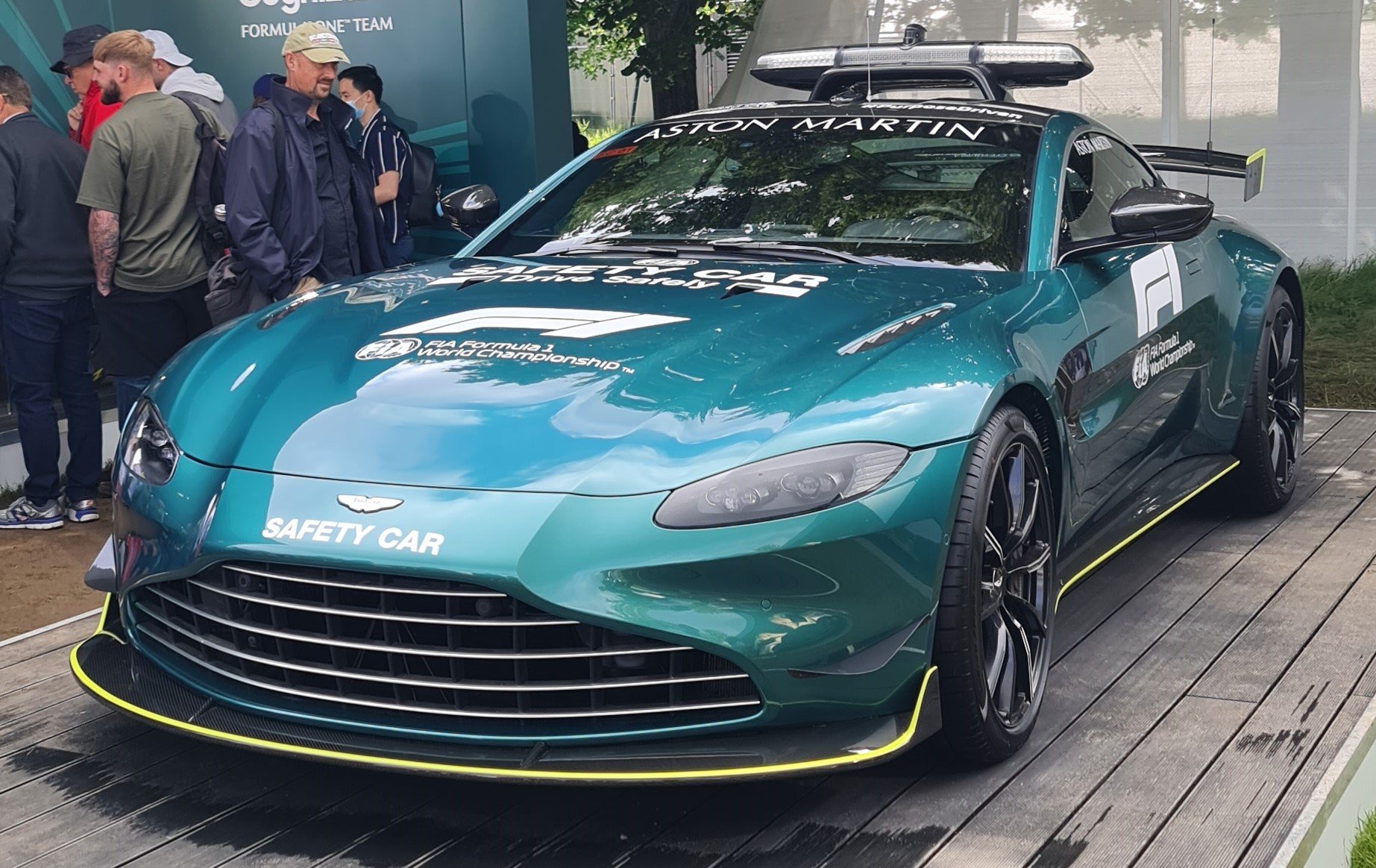
The V8 Vantage F1 Safety Car

The V8 Vantage became the official safety car of Formula One alongside the Mercedes-AMG GT R Safety Car in early 2021. The Vantage Safety Car has a British Racing Green livery with neon yellow accents, and it has been modified to fit with Safety Car standards. The car made its debut as the Safety Car at the 2021 Bahrain Grand Prix. A new Vantage F1 Safety Car based on the 2025 model year was unveiled in March 2024, replacing the previous Vantage F1 Safety Car starting from the 2024 season. Mid 2025 it got replaced with the new Vantage S.

=== V8 Vantage F1 Edition ===
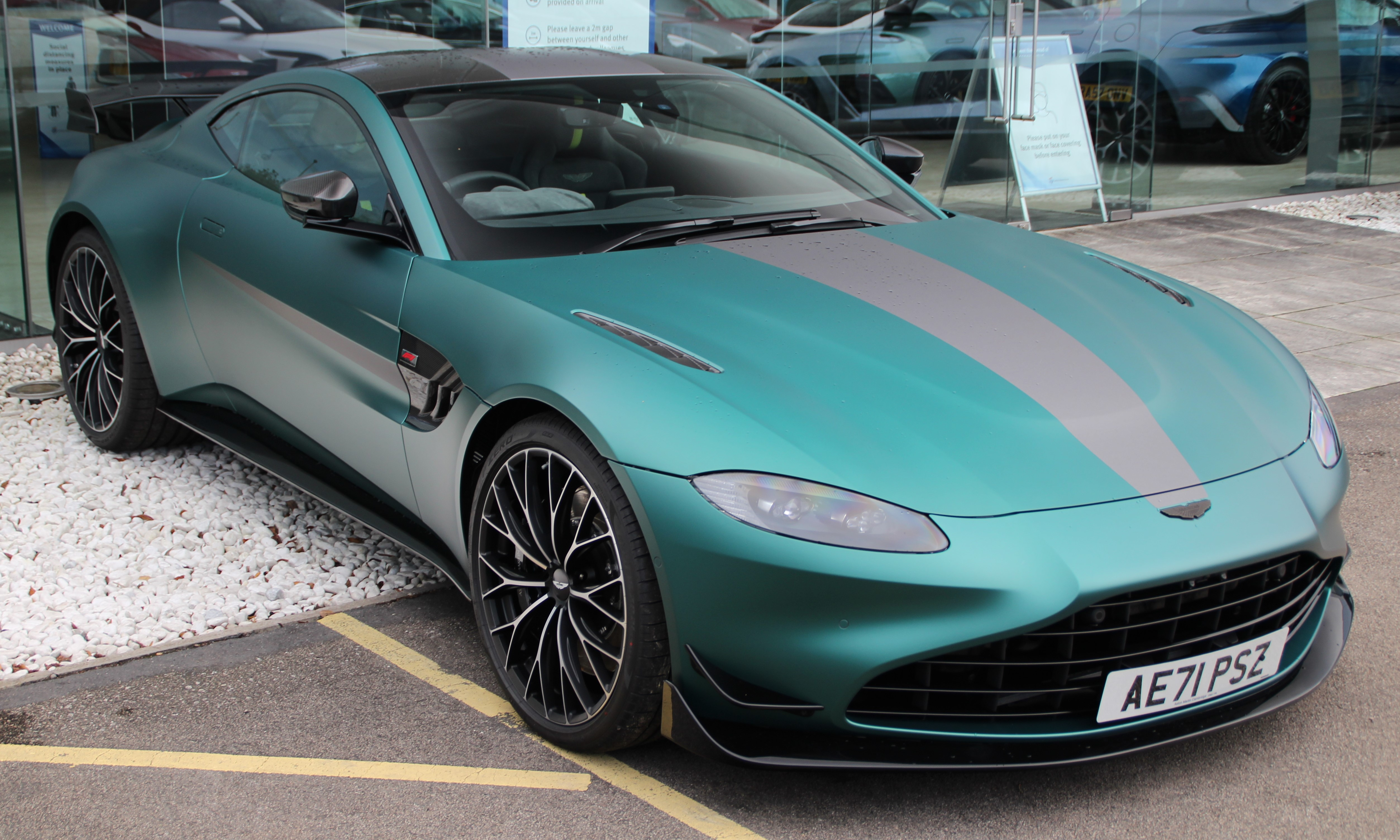
Vantage F1 Edition

The F1 Edition is a version of the V8 Coupe and V8 Roadster commemorating Aston Martin's return to Formula One after 61 years. The car features a fixed rear wing, increased engine power to 535 PS (393 kW; 528 hp), a top speed of 314 km/h (195 mph), new 21-inch wheel rims, and a 0–100 km/h (0–62 mph) acceleration time of 3.5 seconds. The car is available in three colours: Aston Martin Racing Green, Jet Black, and Lunar White. A convertible version called the Roadster is also available.

=== V12 Vantage ===
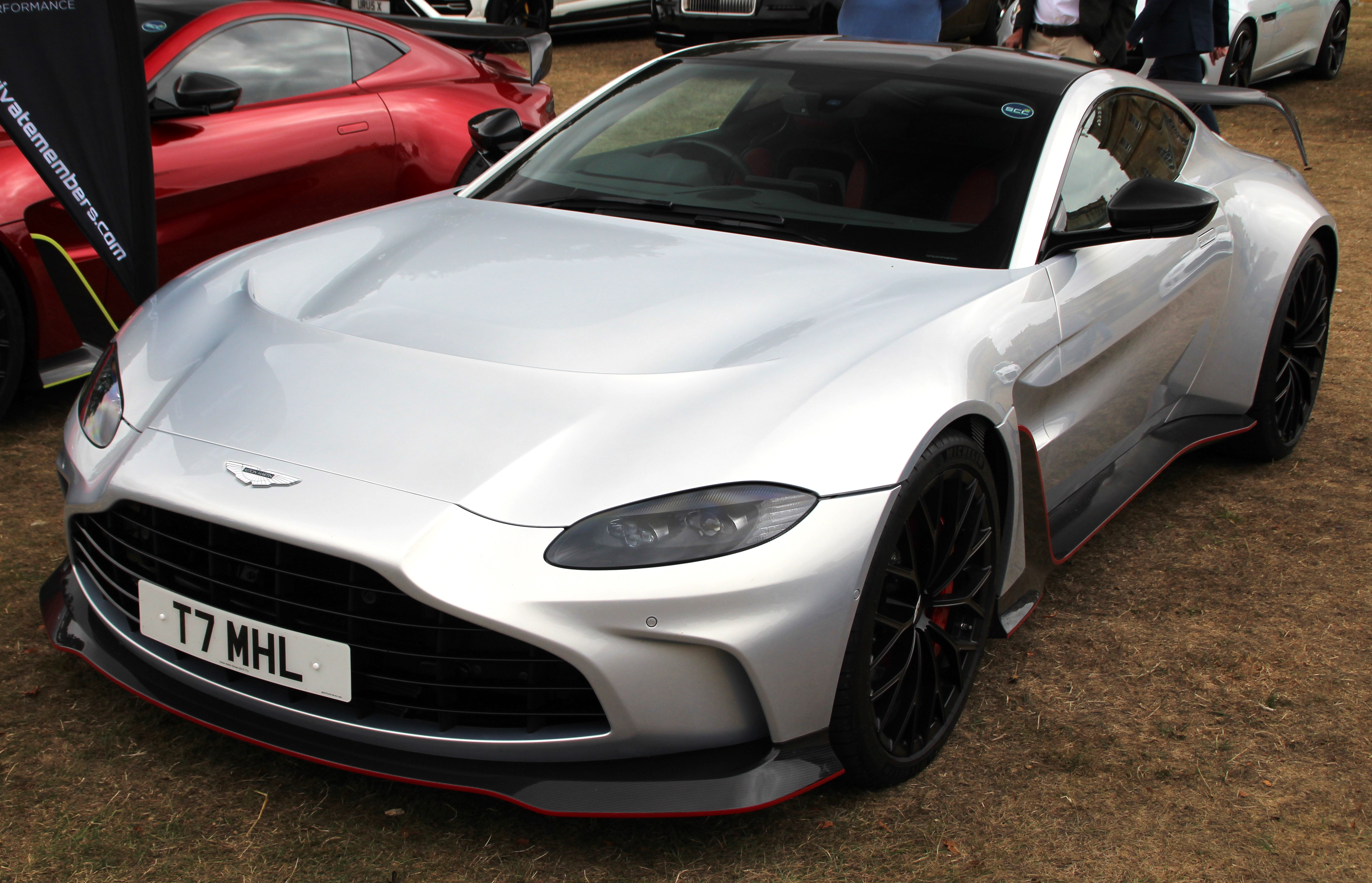
V12 Vantage

In December 2021, Aston Martin confirmed that a V12 Vantage was in development and was slated to be released in 2022. The V12 Vantage was officially unveiled on 16 March 2022, and its production was limited to just 333 units. It uses Aston Martin's AE31 5.2-litre twin-turbocharged V12 and has a power output of 700 PS (515 kW; 690 hp) and 555 lb-ft (753 Nm) of torque. Additionally, the V12 Vantage features revised suspension, a 40mm increase in track width, a new aerodynamic kit which generates up to 204 kg (450 lb) of downforce, and has a 0–100 km/h (0–62 mph) acceleration time of 3.5 seconds. It has a kerb weight of 1,795 kg (3,957 lb), and, at the time was stated to be last Aston Martin Vantage to use a V12 engine.

=== V12 Vantage Roadster ===
Aston Martin revealed at 2022 Pebble Beach Concours d'Elégance a convertible version of the V12 Vantage. It develops 700 PS (515 kW; 690 hp) and only 249 examples will be produced, all sold out. It has a kerb weight of 1,850 kg (4,079 lb).

== 2024 facelift ==
For the 2025 model year, the Vantage was given a significant rework. The new model features an all-new front fascia with updated side and rear styling, updated interior with new proprietary infotainment with 10.25-inch screen similar to the DB12, stiffened body structure, smarter active dynamics, and a larger radiator grille which increases airflow to the radiators by 50 percent.

The most noticeable change is a heavily reworked version of the 4.0-litre twin-turbocharged V8 engine producing 665 PS (489 kW; 656 hp) and 590 lb⋅ft (800 N⋅m) of torque. This is the largest increase in power output from a predecessor in Aston Martin history, with a power increase of 30% at 155 PS (114 kW; 153 hp) and a torque increase of 15% at 85 lb⋅ft (115 N⋅m). The updated Vantage is capable of accelerating from 0–100 km/h (0–62 mph) in 3.5 seconds, and attaining a top speed of 325 km/h (202 mph).

A convertible version called the Vantage Roadster was unveiled in January 2025. The Vantage Roadster features a "Z-fold" configuration, which Aston Martin claims is faster to retract and lighter than the traditional "K-fold" layout. The roof can raise or lower at up to 50 km/h (31 mph) and the operation lasts 6.8 seconds, which Aston Martin claims makes it the fastest roof mechanism available. The Vantage Roadster is 60 kg (132 lb) heavier than the coupe. It can accelerate from 0–97 km/h (0–60 mph) in 3.5 seconds, and retains the coupe's top speed of 325 km/h (202 mph).

In July 2025, Aston Martin unveiled a more powerful version called the Vantage S. The Vantage S has an increased power output of 680 PS (500 kW; 671 hp) and can accelerate from 0–100 km/h (62 mph) in 3.4 seconds.

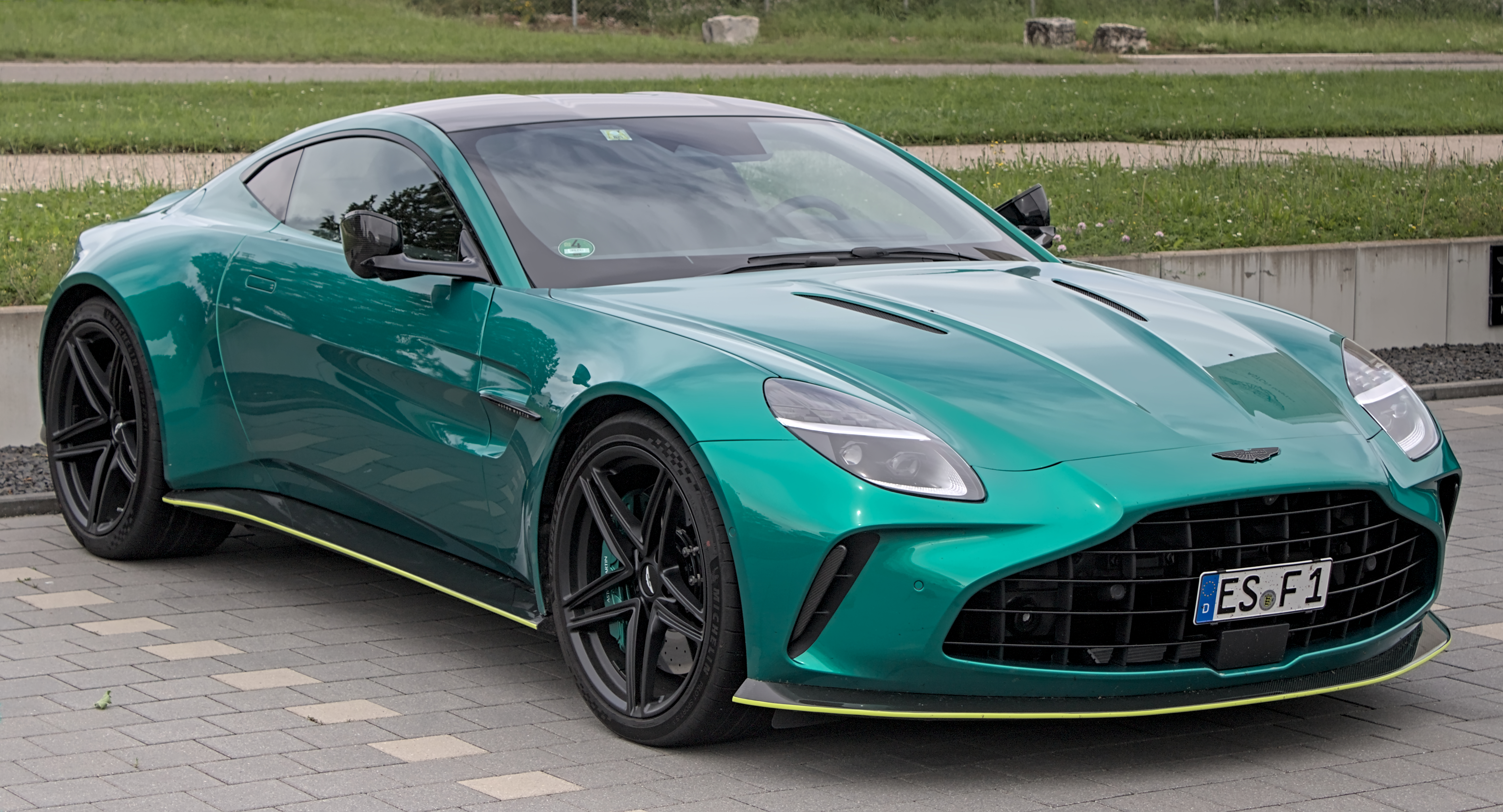
Facelift

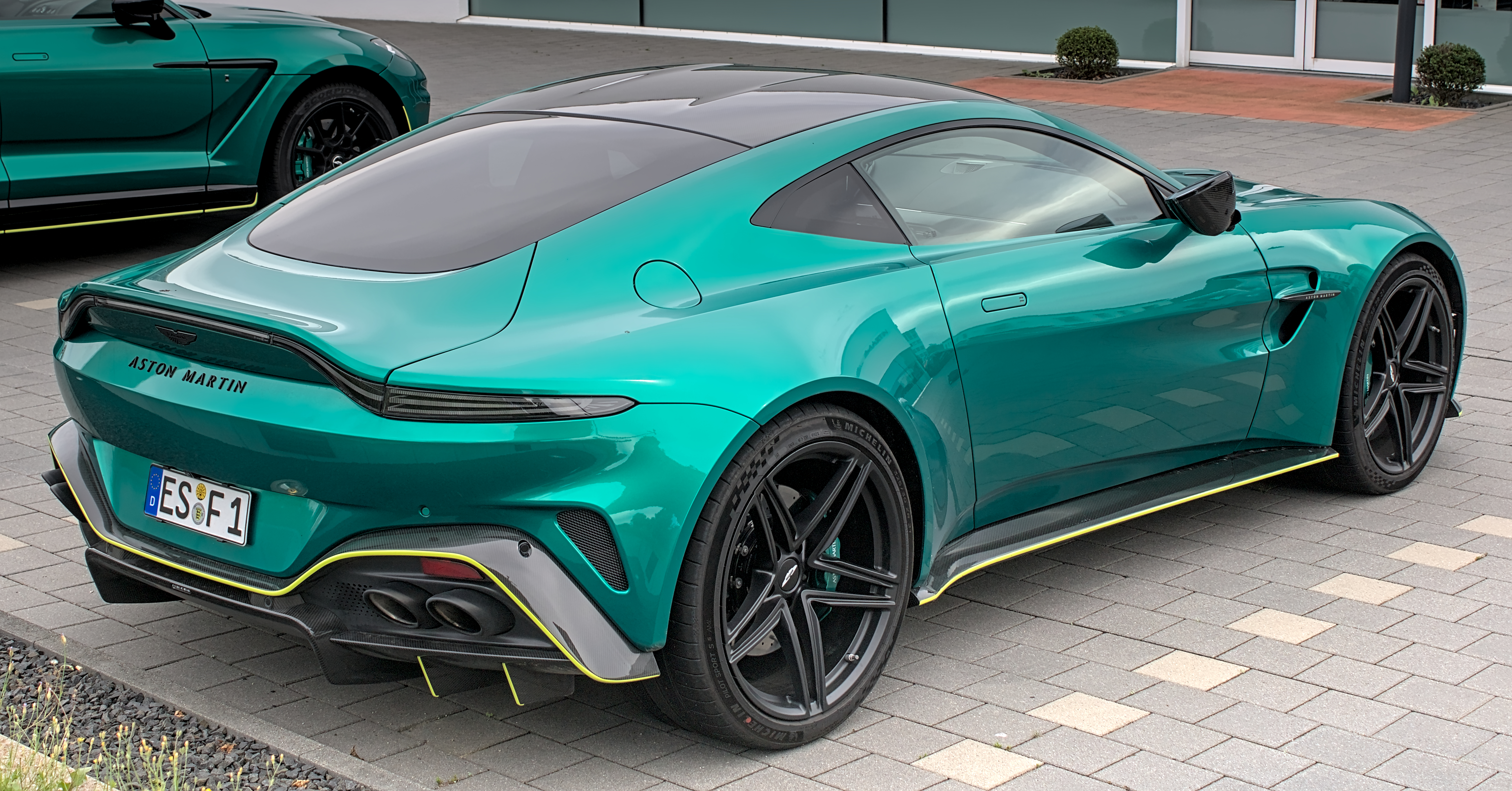
Rear view

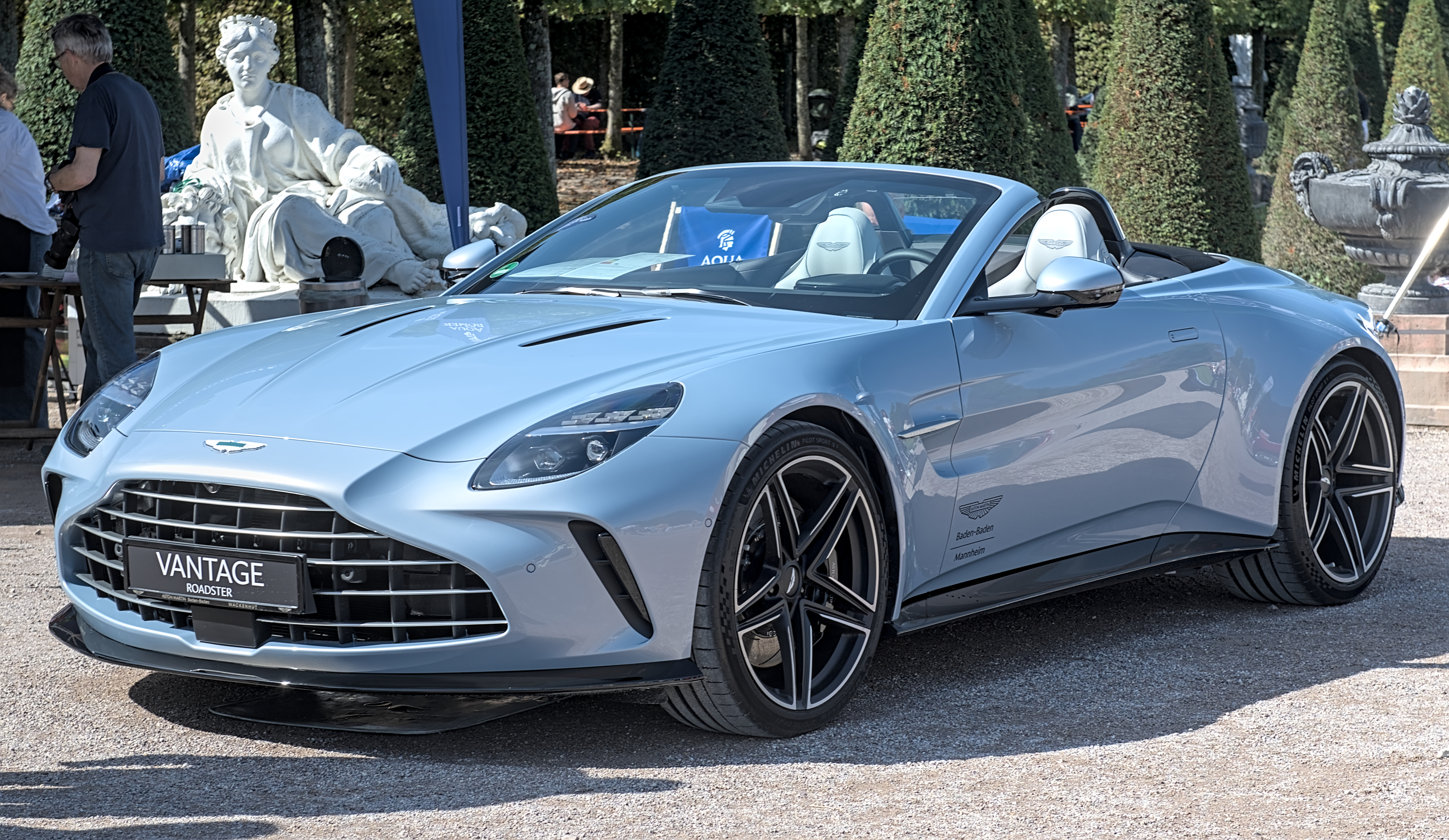
Roadster, Facelift

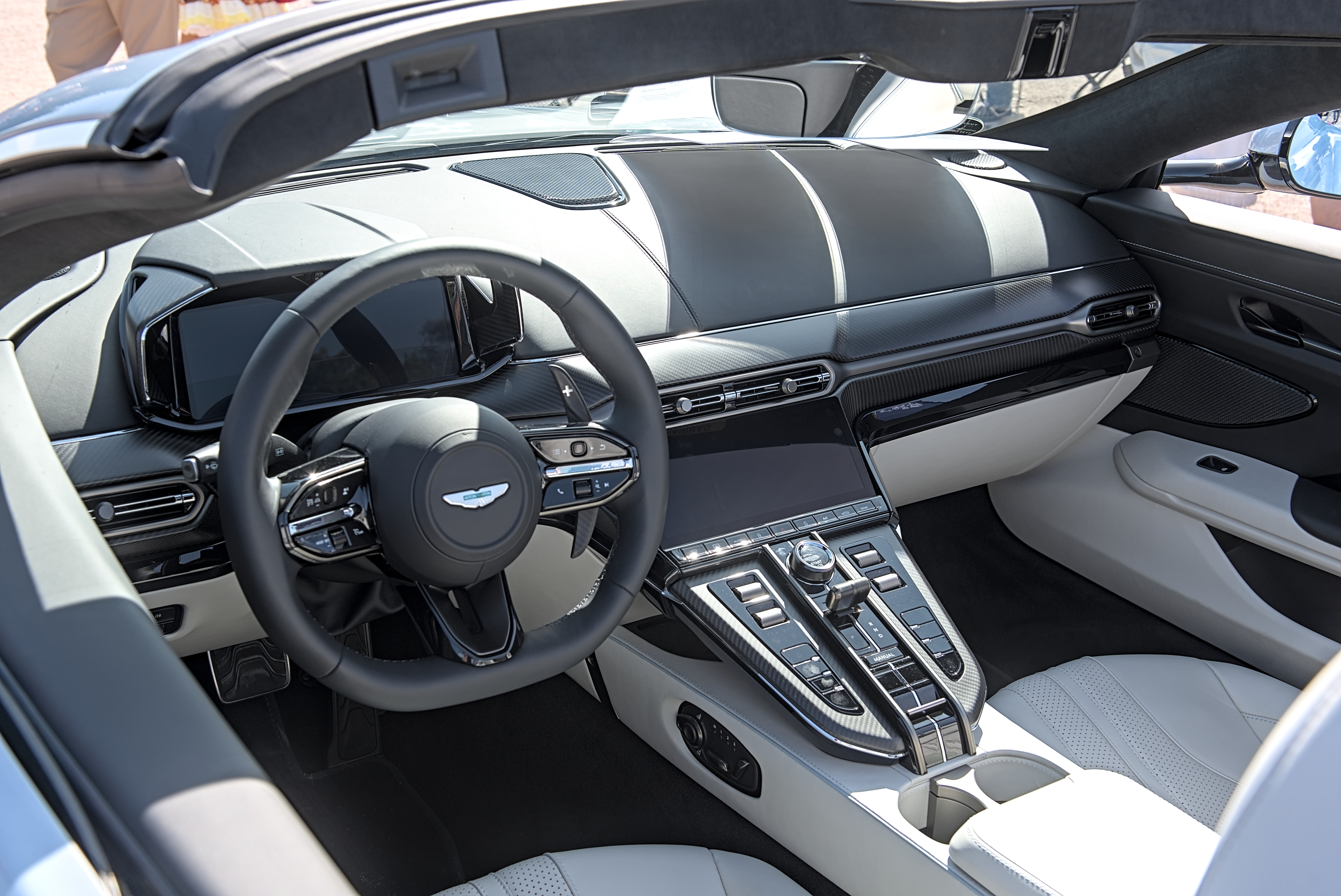
Interior (Roadster)

== Motorsport ==
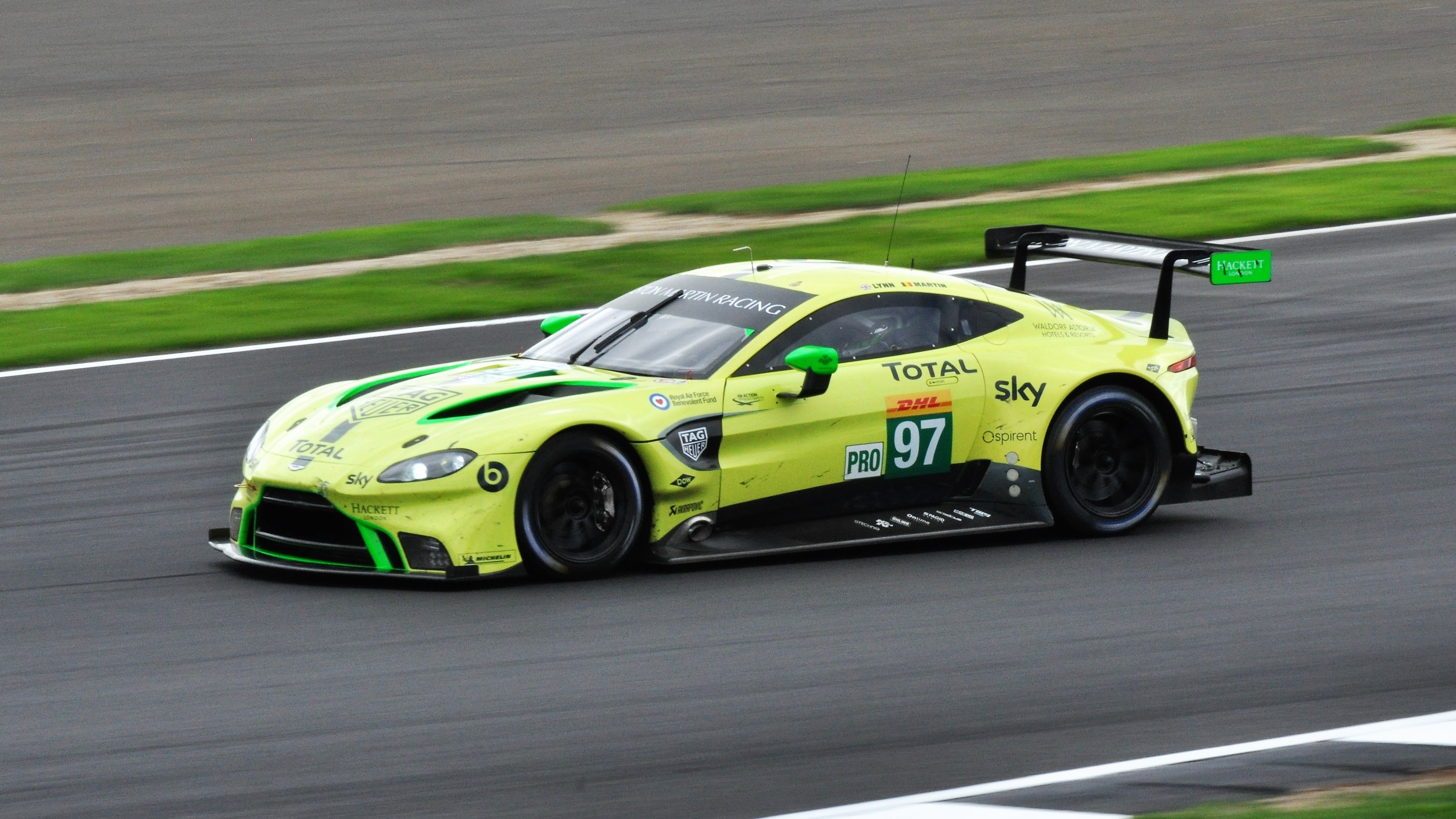
Aston Martin Vantage GTE at Silverstone

=== GTE ===
The Aston Martin Vantage GTE (also known as the Aston Martin Vantage AMR) is an endurance Grand Tourer developed by Aston Martin Racing, the motorsports arm of the British automobile manufacturer Aston Martin. It is based on the 2018 Aston Martin Vantage, and is the successor of the Aston Martin Vantage GT2, and its later derivatives. The car was launched on the 22nd of November 2017, alongside its road-going counterpart in London. The car is noted to be capable of being converted from Group GTE specification to Group GT3 specification.

The Vantage GTE is the GTE-class racing version of the Vantage made to compete in the FIA World Endurance Championship. Like the road-going car, the GTE uses the Mercedes-AMG V8 engine, though it is paired with a 6-speed Xtrac sequential gearbox. Additional changes are made to the engine to increase power. The car is convertible to GT3 specification.

=== DTM ===
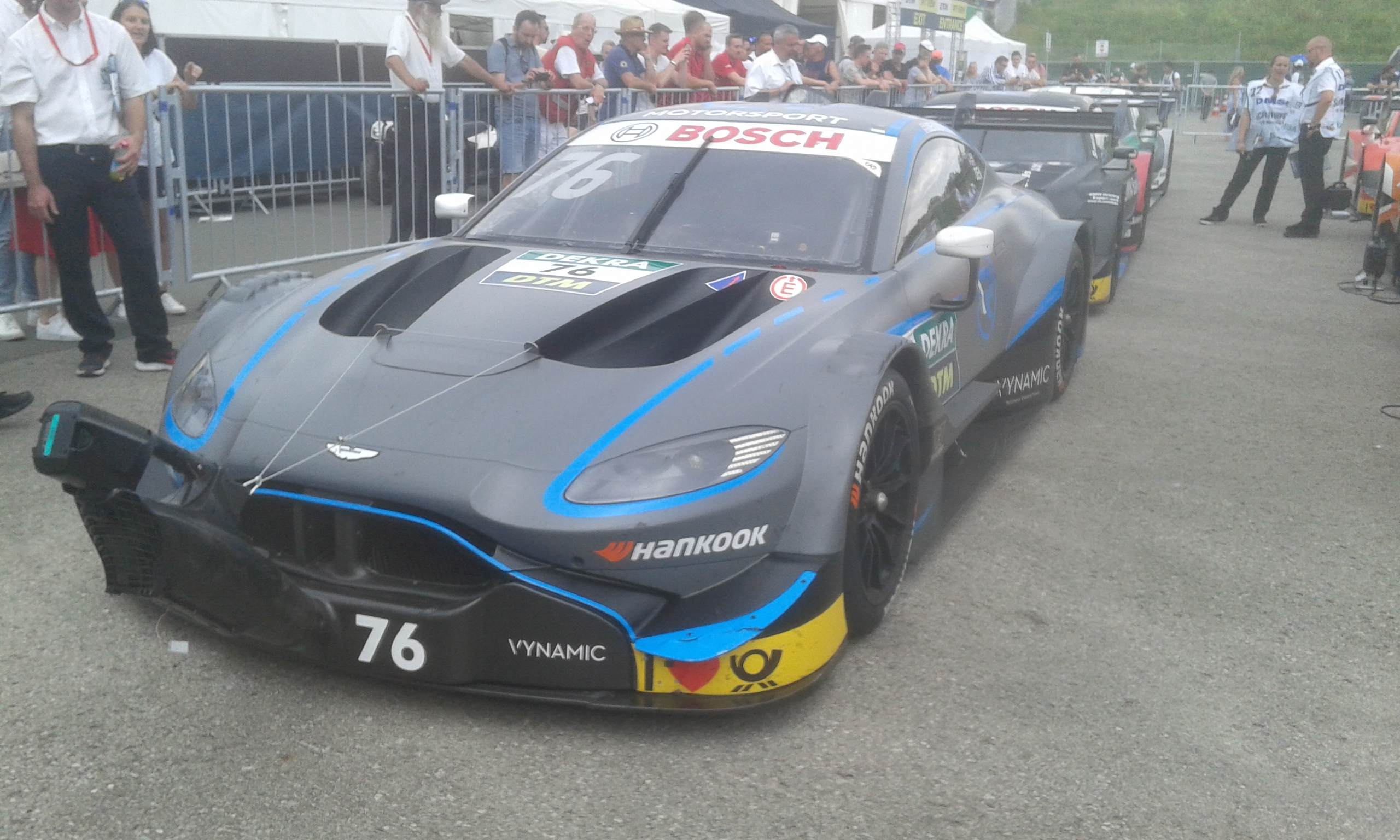
Aston Martin Vantage DTM at the Norisring parc fermé

The Aston Martin Vantage DTM is a "Class 1" touring car constructed by the British car manufacturer Aston Martin for use in the Deutsche Tourenwagen Masters. The Vantage DTM was the first Aston Martin DTM car since its entry to the sport from the 2019 season with the joint-development by HWA. Aston Martin Vantage DTM made DTM début ahead of 2019 DTM season under Class 1 regulations.

HWA AG, in partnership with Aston Martin and R-Motorsport, made an all-new car for the 2019 Deutsche Tourenwagen Masters, based on the new Vantage. The Vantage competed in place of Mercedes-Benz's entry after the manufacturer left the competition to focus on Formula E.

=== GT3 ===
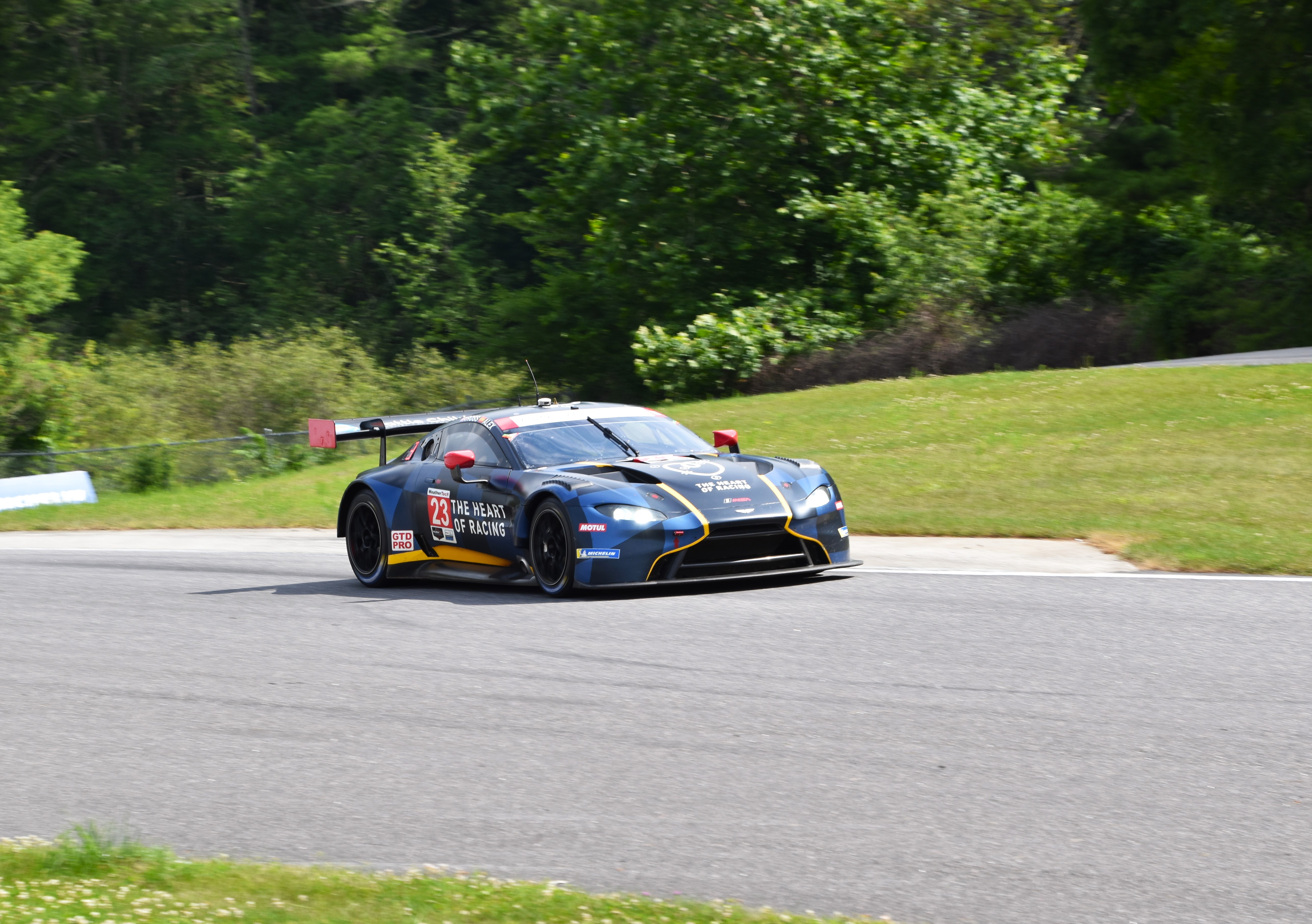
Heart of Racing Team Vantage AMR GT3 at Lime Rock Park (IMSA, 2022)

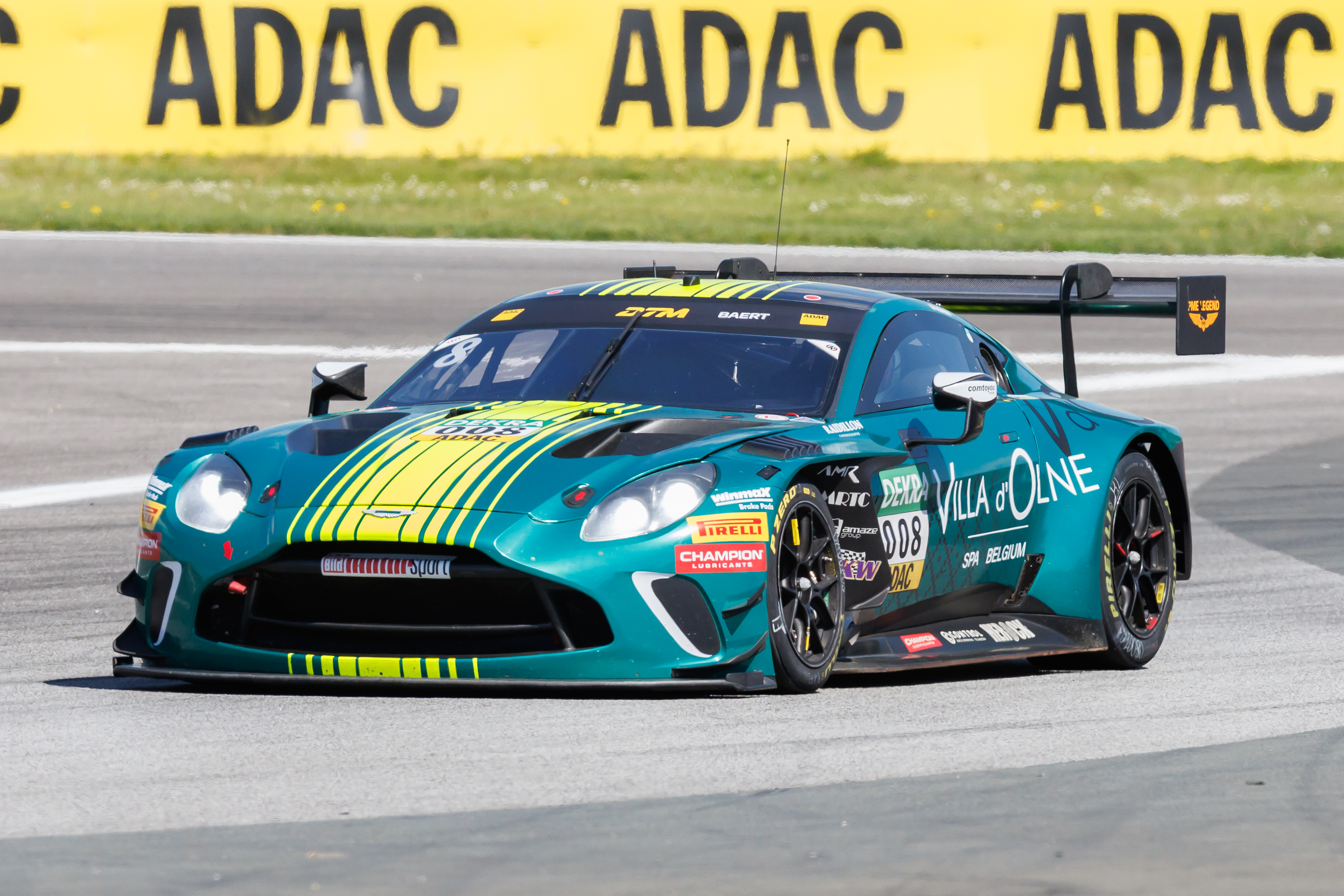
The No.008 Comtoyou Racing Vantage AMR GT3 Evo of Nicolas Baert during the Oschersleben round of the 2025 DTM season.

The Vantage GT3 is the successor of the V12 Vantage GT3. The engine has a power output of 542 PS (399 kW; 535 hp) and 516 lb⋅ft (700 N⋅m) of torque. It features a quick-shifting Xtrac 6-speed sequential gearbox, an Alcon motorsport multi-plate clutch, Öhlins four-way adjustable dampers, Alcon brakes, and a Bosch anti-lock braking system. The Vantage GT3 has a dry weight of 1,245 kg (2,745 lb). An all-new Vantage GT3 based on the 2025 model year Vantage was unveiled on 12 February 2024. This car was also purchasable as an Evo kit for the 2019 model.

=== GT8R ===
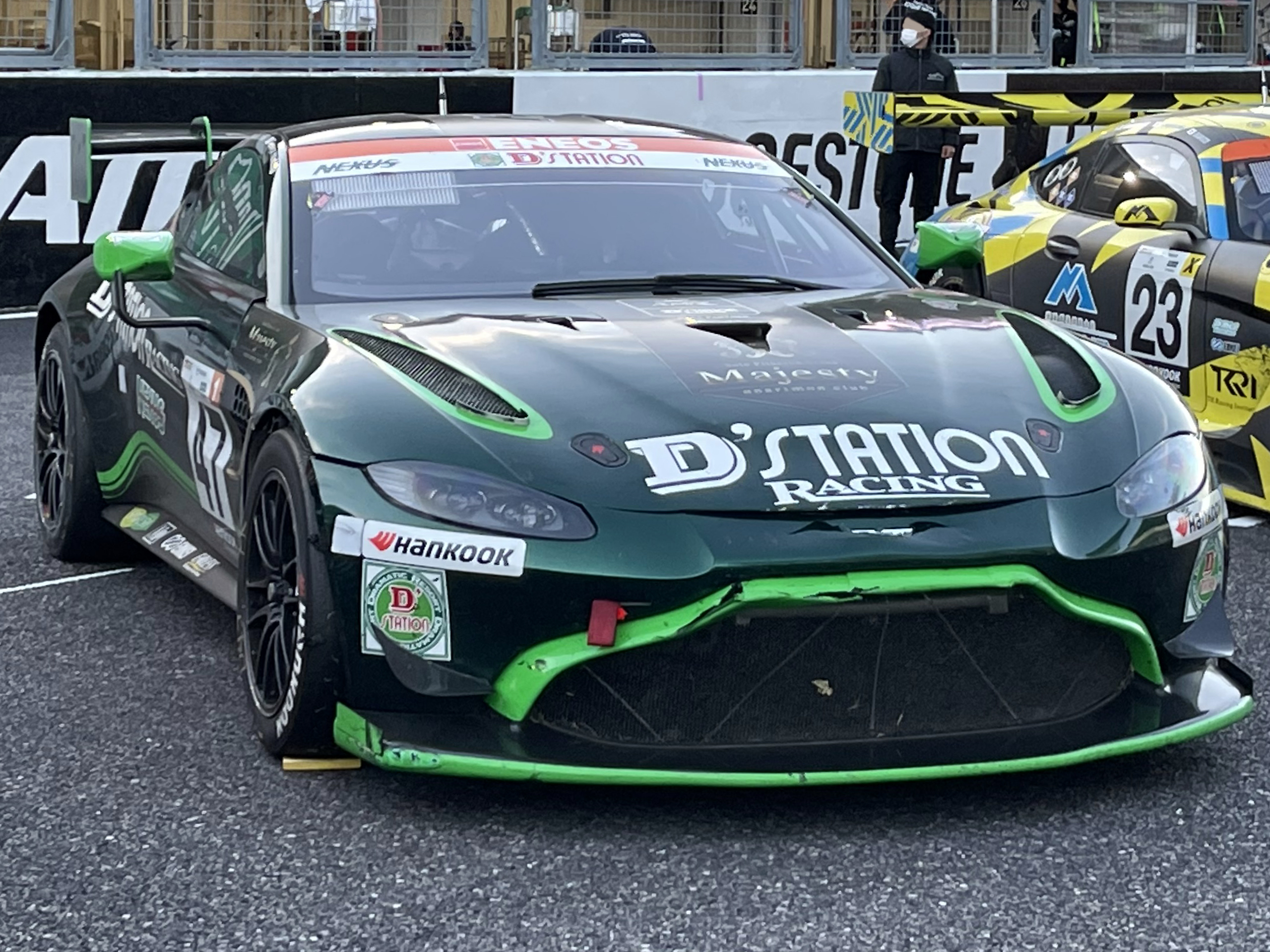
Aston Martin Vantage GT8R at Suzuka

The Vantage GT8R was announced in 2020 as a new model between the existing GT3 and GT4 models, to compete in the SP8T class. It was debuted at the 2020 24 Hours of Nürburgring.

The GT8R has a larger rear wing and new dive planes and splitter compared to the GT4, and power and weight adjusted for SP8T regulations. The engine has a power output of 557 PS (410 kW; 549 hp) and a kerb weight of 1,450 kg (3,197 lb). It is designed primarily for the Nürburgring Endurance Series and 24 Hours Nürburgring, but is also eligible for the GT Cup, Super Taikyu Series, New Zealand Endurance Championship, and the Trans-Am Series.

=== GT4 ===
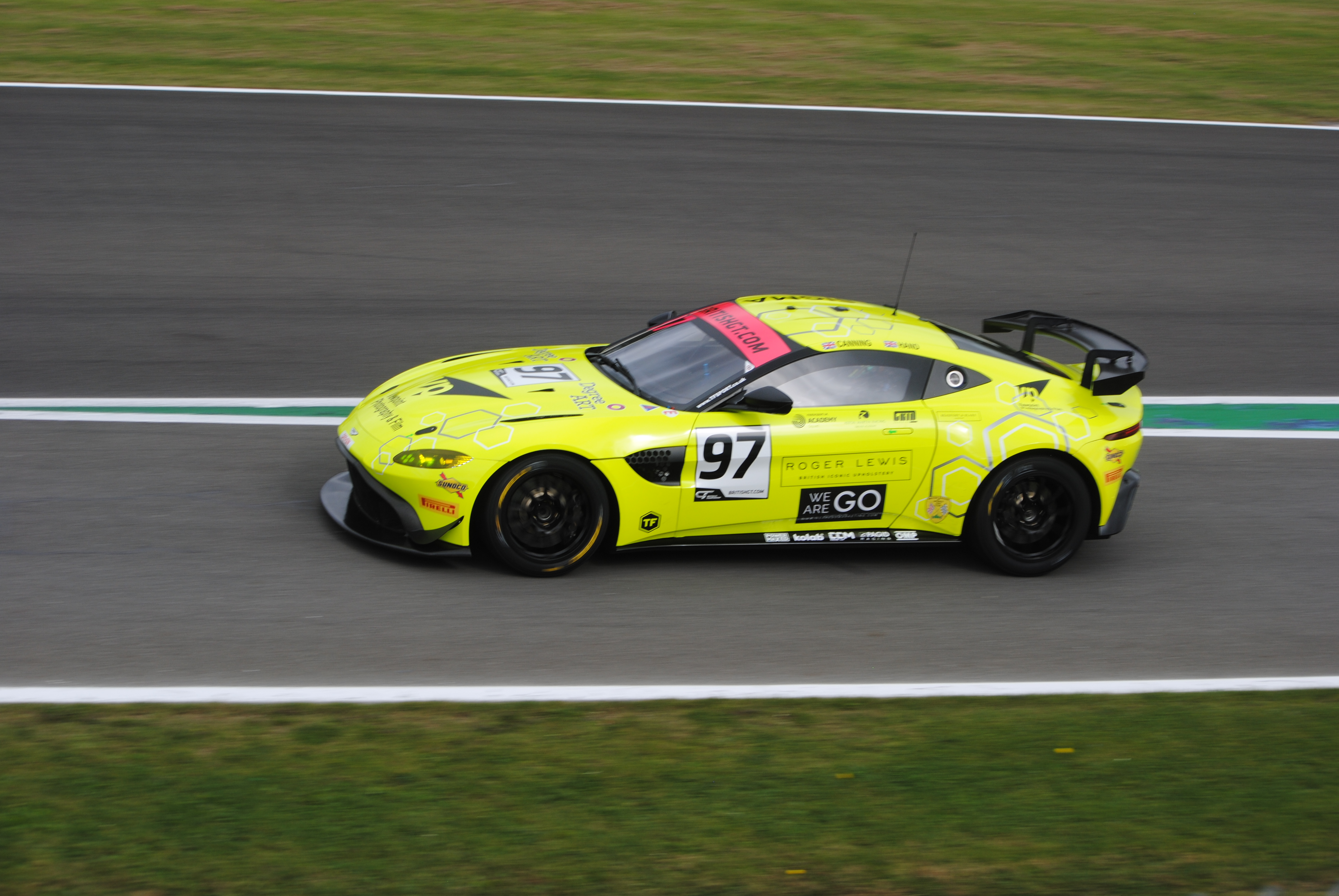
Aston Martin Vantage AMR GT4 leaving the pits at Donington Park

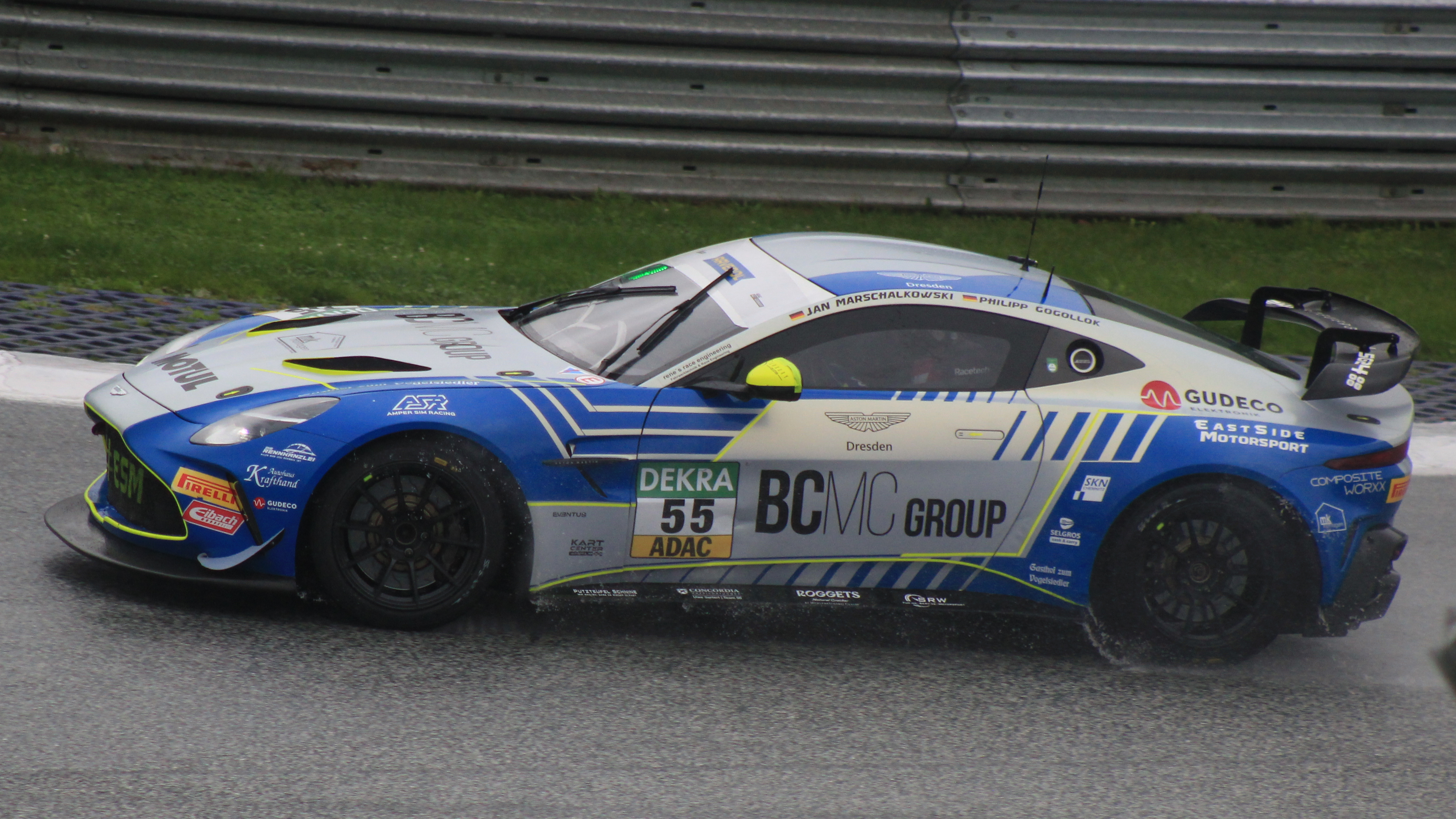
Aston Martin Vantage AMR GT4 Evo on track at the Red Bull Ring

The Vantage GT4 is the replacement of the previous generation GT4, and is intended for entry-level drivers in competitive motorsports. The Vantage GT4 made its debut in the 2019 24 Hours of Nürburgring. The car would be replaced by a new Vantage GT4 based on the 2025 model year in 2024. The new Vantage GT4 uses the same 4.0-litre Mercedes-AMG M177 V8 engine producing 476 PS (350 kW; 469 hp) and 471 lb⋅ft (639 N⋅m) of torque, although both outputs can be raised via boost controller depending on Balance-of-Performance regulations. It has a dry weight of 1,465 kg (3,230 lb).
