= Aston Martin CC100 =

Aston Martin CC100 Speedster
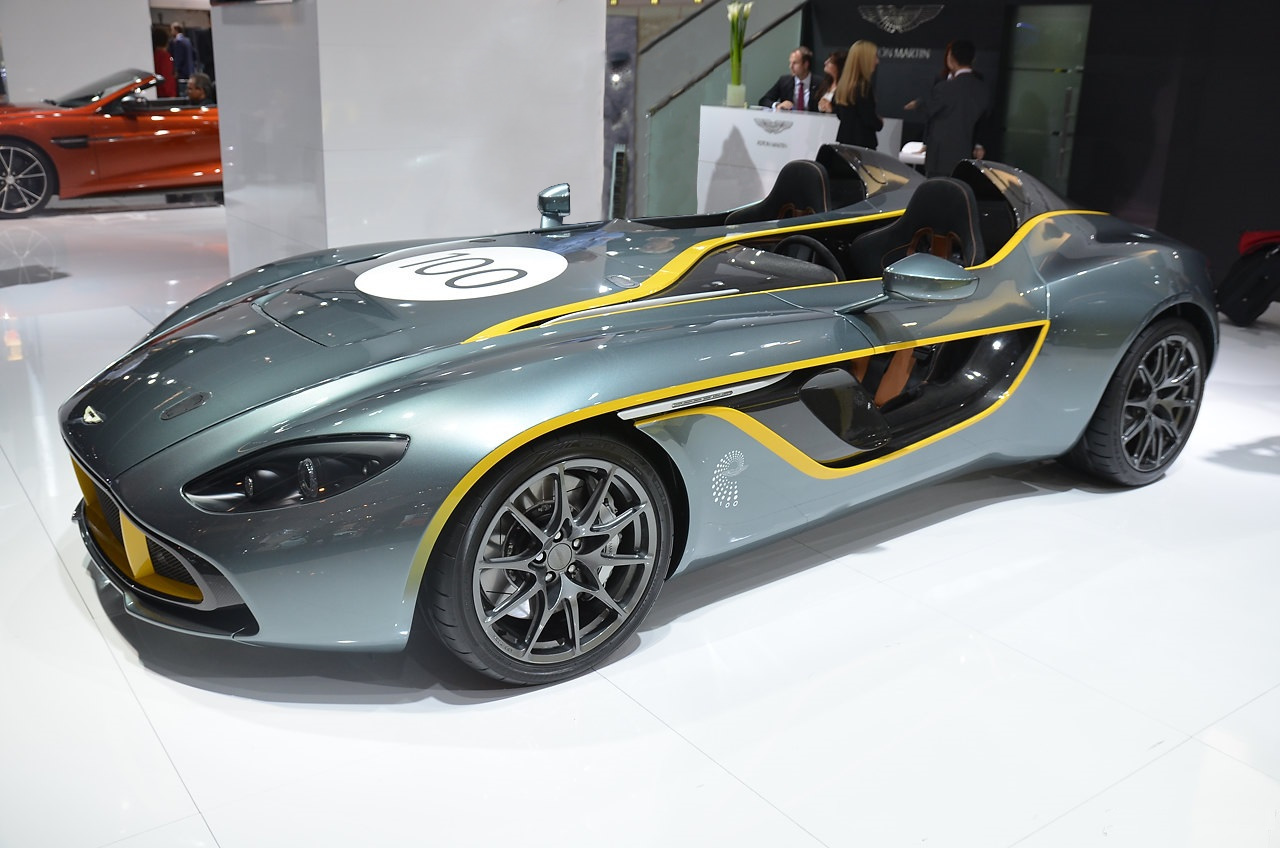

Overview
- Manufacturer: Aston Martin
- Production: 2013; 2 made
- Designer: Miles Nurnberger & Sam Holgate

Body and chassis
- Class: Sports car (S)
- Body style: 2-door Speedster
- Layout: FR layout
- Platform: VH platform
- Doors: Swan doors

Powertrain
- Engine: 6.0 L V12
- Transmission: 6-speed automated sequential manual

Chronology
- Successor: Aston Martin V12 Speedster

The Aston Martin CC100 Speedster is a sports car produced by the British car company Aston Martin to celebrate its 100th anniversary, announced in May 2013 at the ADAC Zurich 24 Hours of Nürburgring race. Only two were produced and both were sold to loyal customers. One of the owners plans to keep it in his private collection, while the owner of the second car plans to get regulatory approval so it can be driven on public roads.

The CC100 is powered by a naturally aspirated V12 engine mated to an automated sequential manual 6-speed gearbox, enabling a claimed limited top speed of 180 mph (290 km/h), and acceleration from 0 to 62 mph (100 km/h) in under 4 seconds.

== Design ==
The CC100 is inspired by the 1950s DBR1 with an open split cockpit, cutaway doors and twin rear buttresses. It was designed by Miles Nurnberger and is built on Aston's VH platform, with a carbon fibre body designed and built at the company's headquarters in Gaydon.

Aston Martin CC100 Speedster

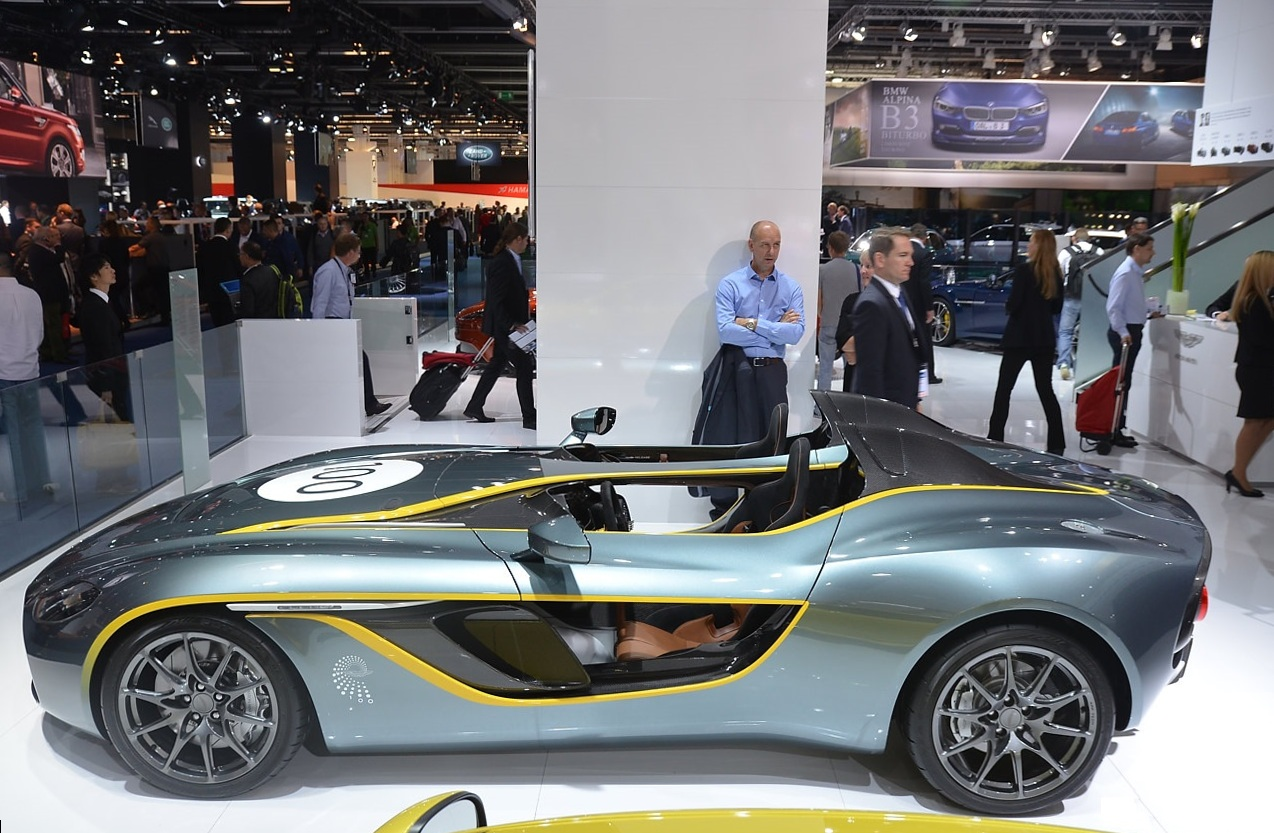

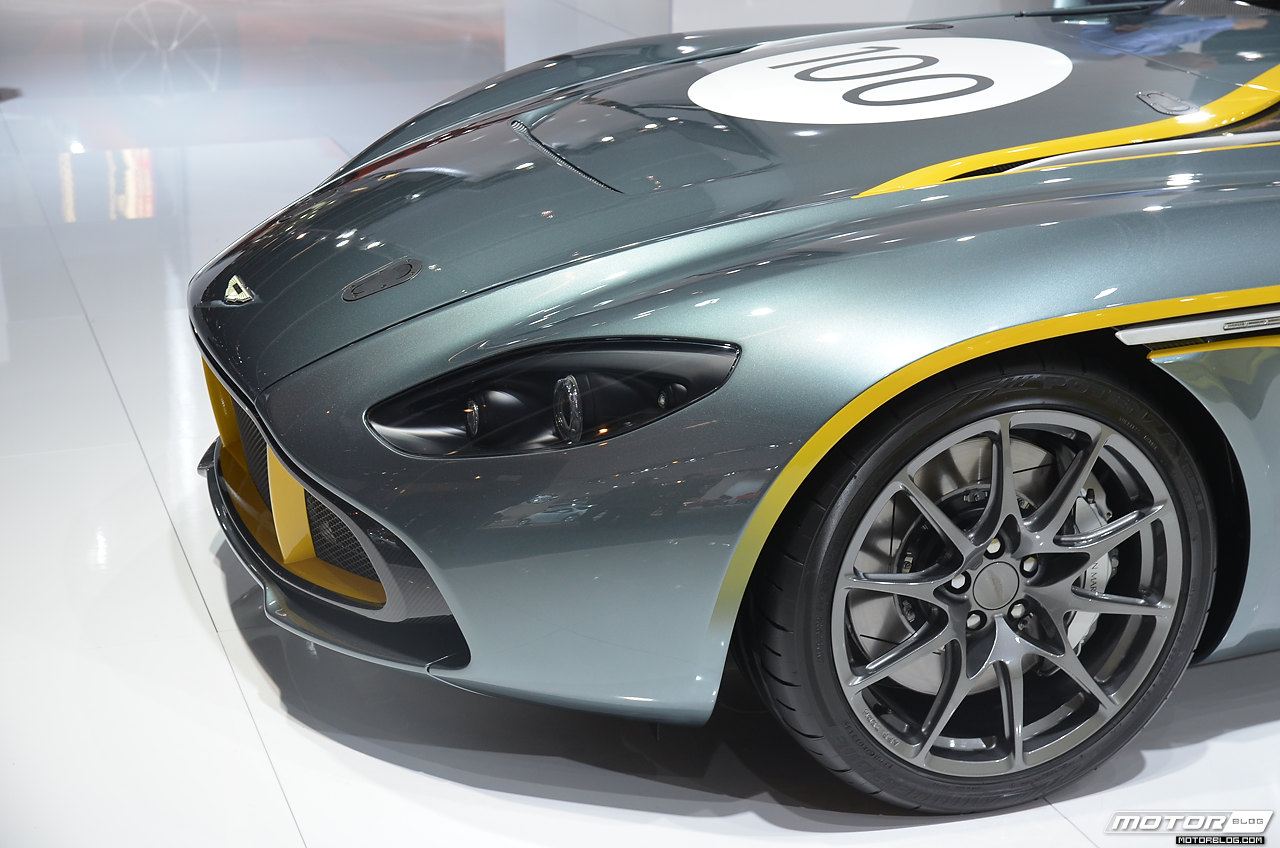

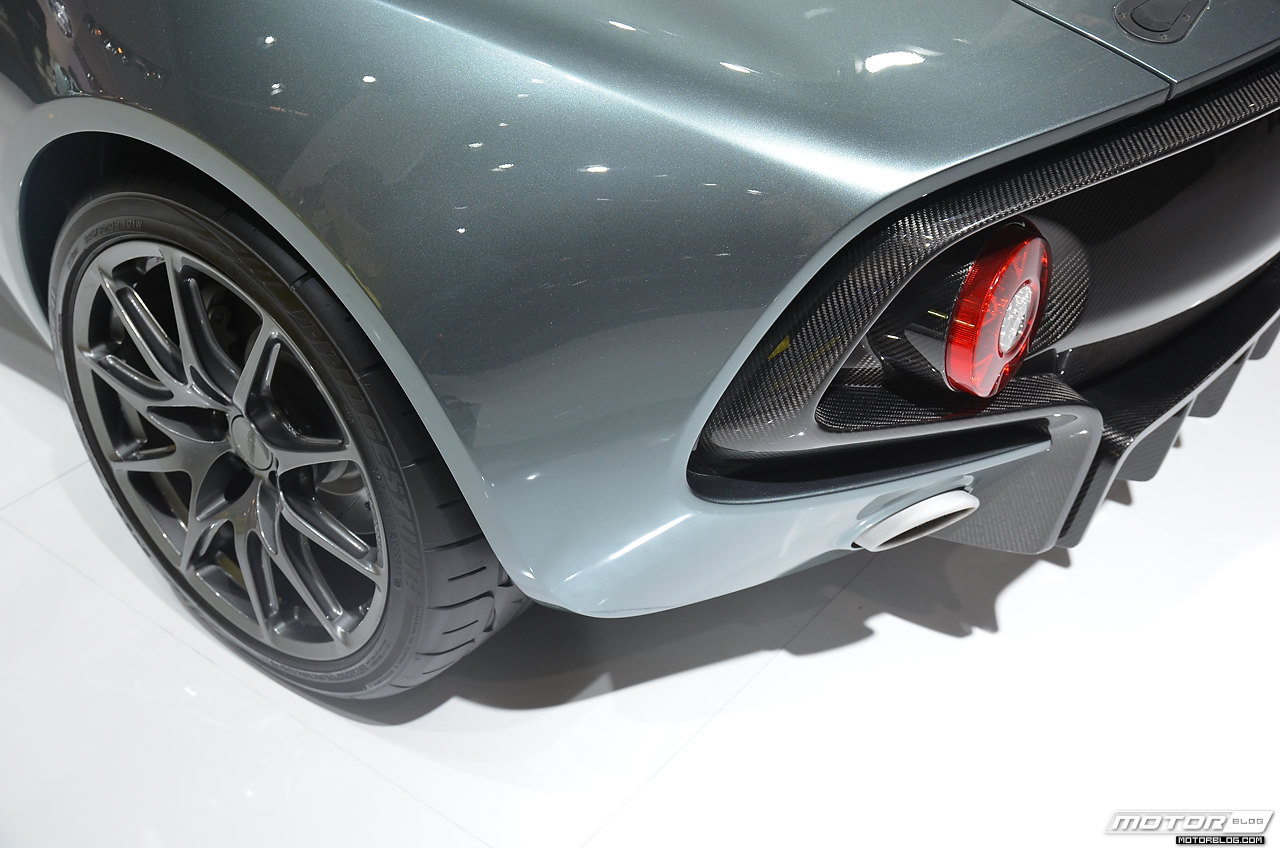

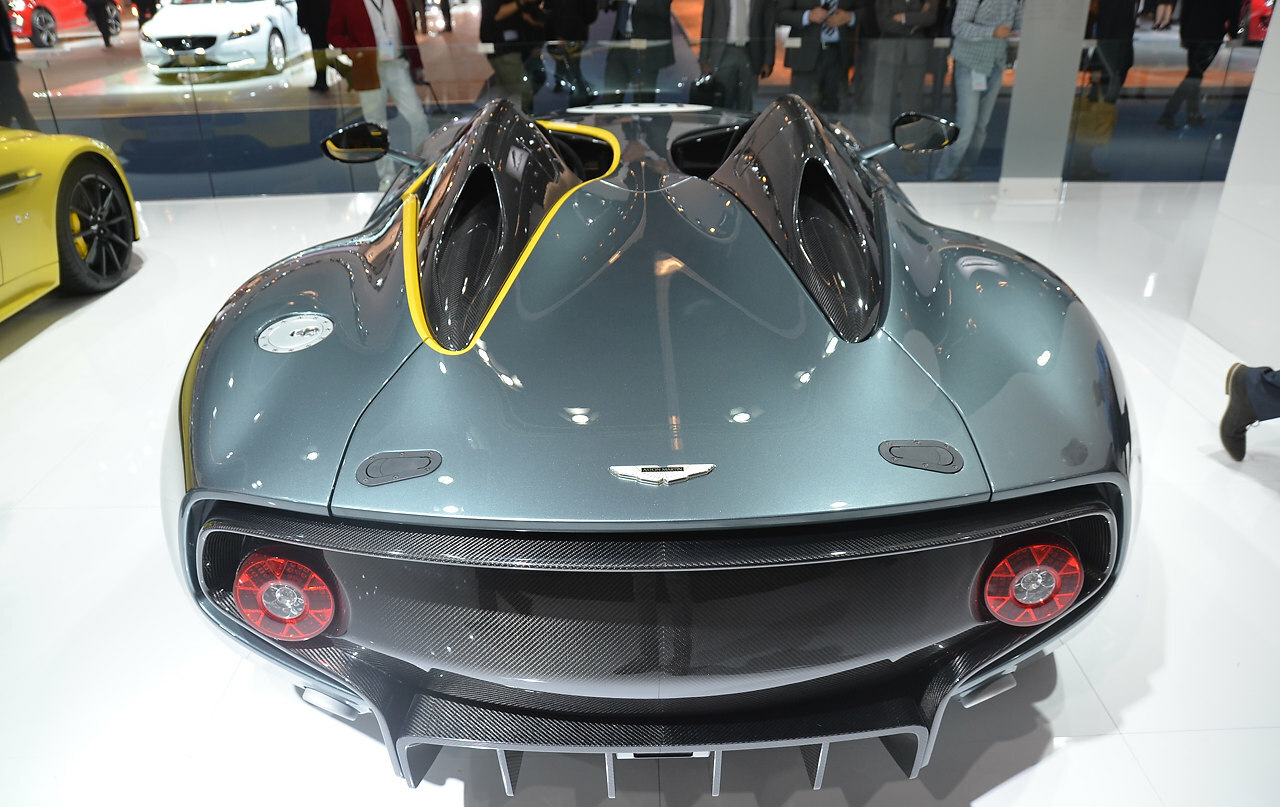

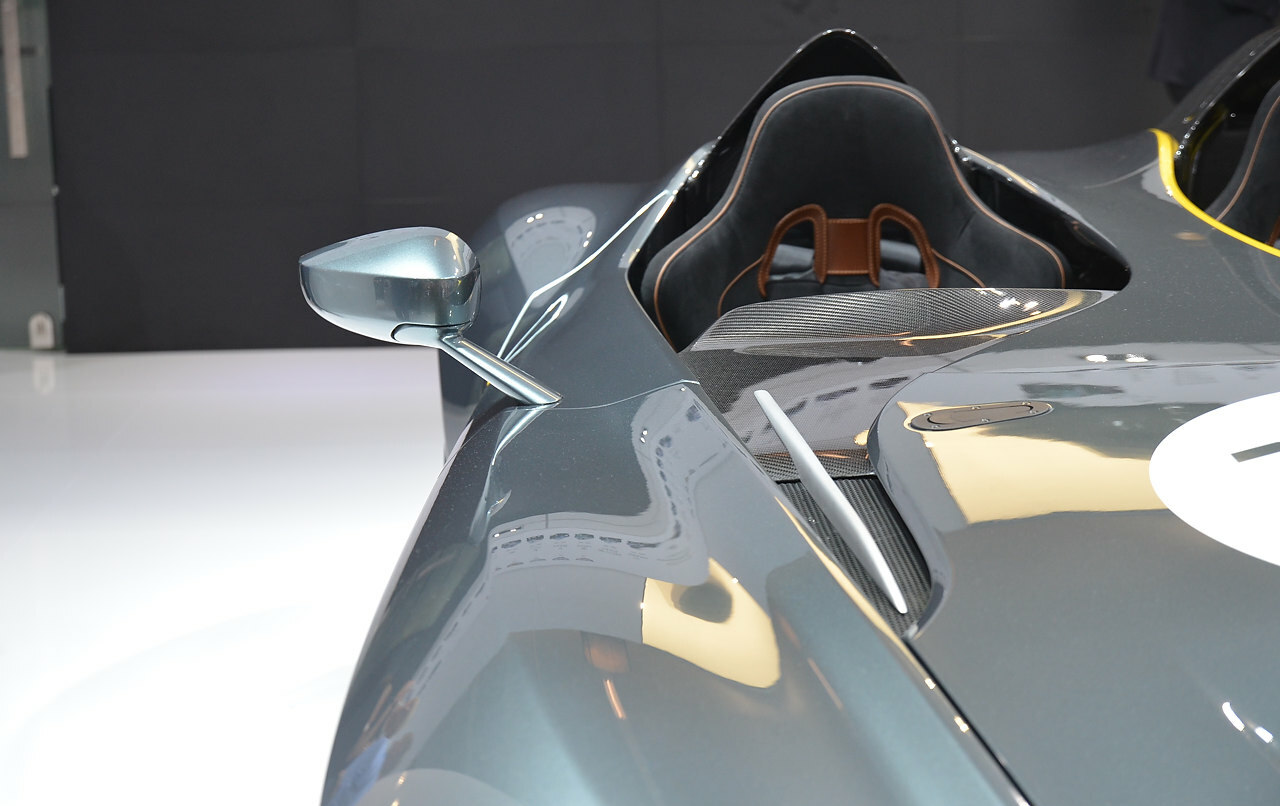

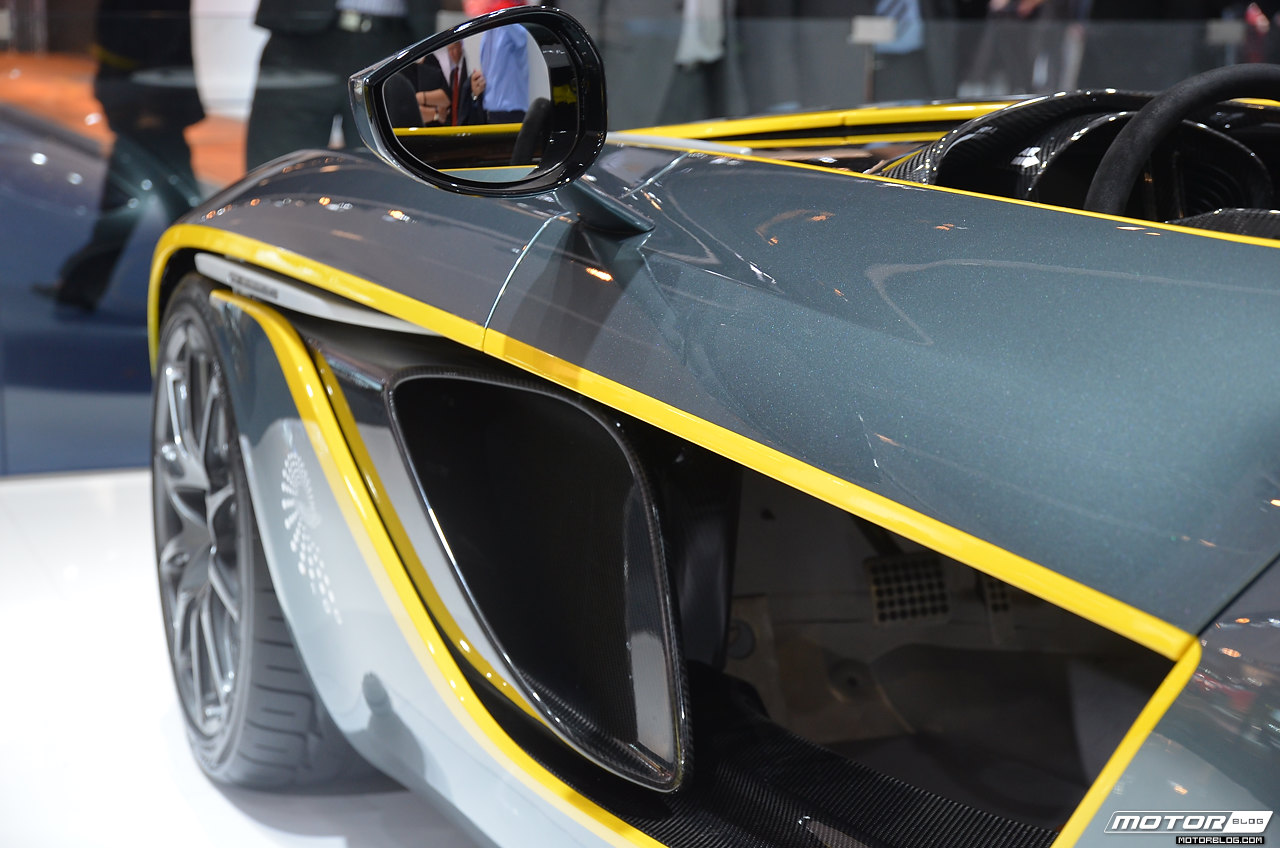
