= Aston Martin Vanquish =

2001 British luxury car

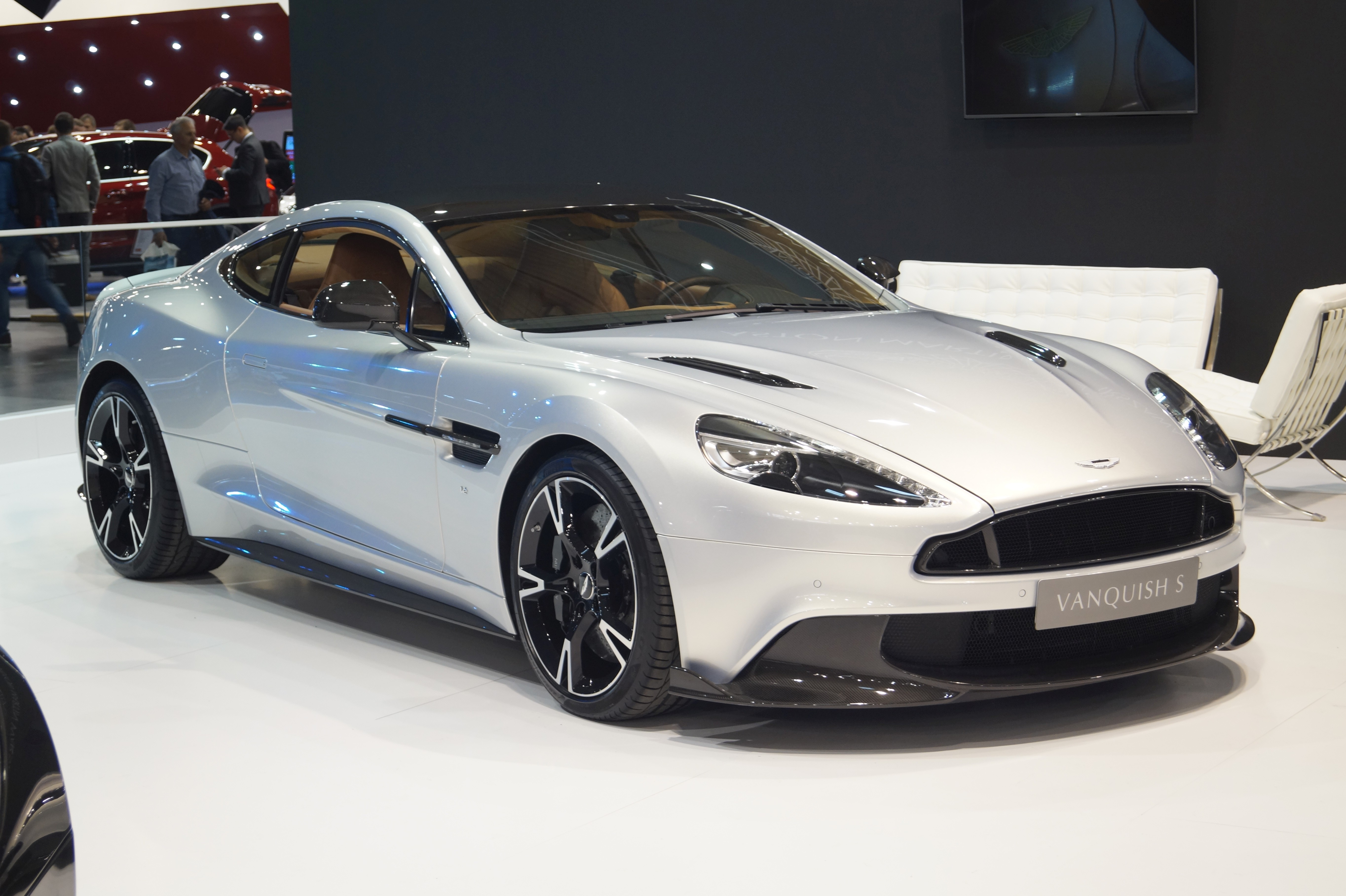
- Second generation Aston Martin Vanquish S

Overview
- Manufacturer: Aston Martin
- Production: 2001–2007 (First generation); 2012–2018 (Second generation); 2024–present (Third generation)

Body and chassis
- Class: Grand tourer (S)
- Body style: 2-door coupé; 2-door convertible
- Layout: Front mid-engine, rear-wheel-drive
- Doors: Swan

The Aston Martin Vanquish is a grand tourer introduced by British luxury automobile manufacturer Aston Martin in 2001 as a successor to the Aston Martin Virage (1993).

The Aston Martin V12 Vanquish was designed by Ian Callum and unveiled at the 2001 Geneva Motor Show. It was produced from 2001 to 2007 as the flagship of the marque. A concept car, known as "Project Vantage", and the first Aston Martin design wholly designed by Callum, was built to display the company's vision for a future sports car that could represent Aston Martin's aspirations after the discontinuation of the Virage-based Vantage. The concept car evolved directly into the V12 Vanquish, and featured a carbon fibre and alloy structure, Aston Martin's most powerful V12 engine, and a host of new technologies. A specially modified V12 Vanquish was driven by James Bond in the 2002 film Die Another Day. In 2004, a mildly updated version of the first-generation model, named "V12 Vanquish S", was introduced, featuring a more highly tuned engine and more track-oriented ride and handling. The V12 Vanquish was indirectly replaced by the DBS after 2007.

The second-generation "Vanquish" was introduced in 2012, this time based on Aston Martin's existing VH platform – similar to the one that underpinned the DB9. Designed by Marek Reichman and made in the Gaydon facility, the VH platform Vanquish was designed to fill the shoes of the discontinued DBS. In 2017, a "Vanquish S" with a more powerful engine and improved aerodynamics was launched. The second-generation Gaydon Vanquish was succeeded by the DBS Superleggera in 2018. In September 2024, Aston Martin announced the third-generation Vanquish as the successor of the DBS Superleggera.

== First generation (2001–2007) ==
First generation
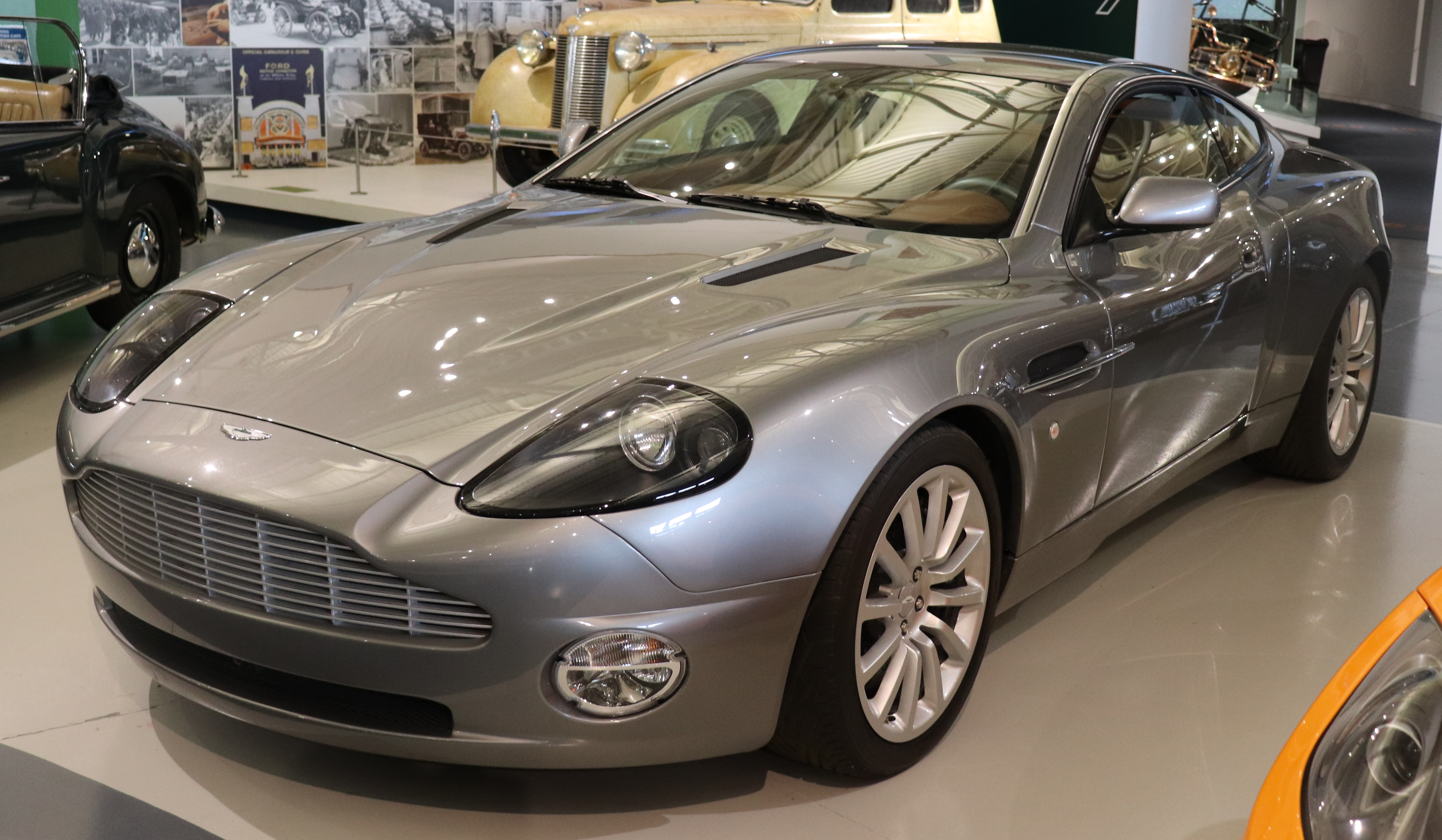

Overview
- Production: September 2001–2007: Vanquish: 1,492 units; Vanquish S: 1,086 units
- Assembly: United Kingdom: Newport Pagnell, Buckinghamshire
- Designer: Ian Callum

Body and chassis
- Body style: 2-door coupé; 2-door 2+2 coupé
- Related: Aston Martin DB7 Vantage

Powertrain
- Engine: 5.9 L AM03 V12 (Vanquish); 5.9 L AM06 V12 (Vanquish S)
- Transmission: 6-speed automated manual 6-speed manual

Dimensions
- Wheelbase: 2,690 mm (105.9 in)
- Length: 4,665 mm (183.7 in)
- Width: 1,923 mm (75.7 in)
- Height: 1,318 mm (51.9 in)
- Kerb weight: 1,835 kg (4,045 lb) (Vanquish); 1,875 kg (4,134 lb) (Vanquish S)

Chronology
- Predecessor: Aston Martin Virage
- Successor: Aston Martin DBS (2007)

=== V12 Vanquish (2001–2005) ===
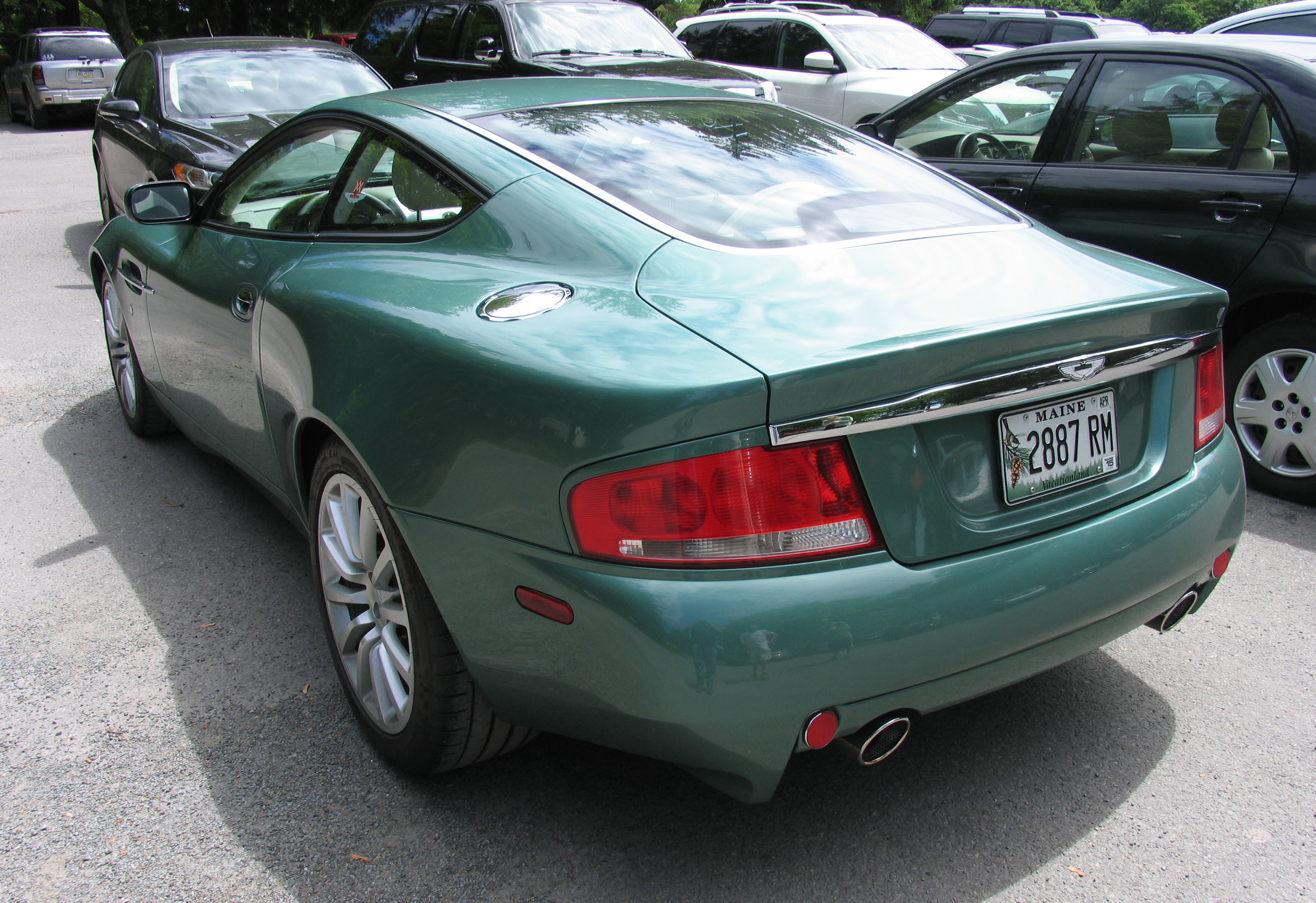
Rear 3/4 view

The Aston Martin V12 Vanquish was styled by Ian Callum and drew inspiration from the DB4 GT Zagato, projecting a more aggressive presence than Callum's DB7 Vantage. The production car closely resembled the Project Vantage Concept which debuted with a V12 engine at the North American International Auto Show in January 1998. Underneath, the V12 Vanquish car featured a unique and bespoke bonded aluminium composite chassis with a carbon fibre backbone developed in partnership with Lotus, an advanced independent suspension, and a more highly tuned version of the naturally aspirated 5,935 cc (5.9 L; 362.2 cu in) Aston Martin V12 engine that had debuted in the DB7 two years earlier. It was available in 2+0 and 2+2 seating configurations and came only in a coupé body style.

The naturally aspirated 60° DOHC 4 valves per cylinder V12 engine with a bore and stroke of 89 mm × 79.5 mm (3.50 in × 3.13 in) produced 343 kW; 460 hp (466 PS) at 6,500 rpm and 400 lb⋅ft (542 N⋅m) of torque at 5,000 rpm. It is controlled by a drive-by-wire throttle and driven by a 6-speed automated manual transmission. The Vanquish model debuted with 355 mm (14.0 inches) drilled and ventilated disc brakes with four-piston calipers, ABS, with electronic brake distribution. The interior featured full instrumentation, advanced electronics, and a choice of leather upholstery with metallic details – the latter was an intentional move away from the wood trim seen in the DB7.

As Aston Martin's flagship car for the era, the V12 Vanquish was designed to deliver new performance benchmarks for the company. It featured an acceleration time from 0–60 mph (0–97 km/h) of 4.5 seconds and a top speed of 190 mph (306 km/h). The first-generation V12 Vanquish was generally well received by the motoring press. Road tests included praise for its powertrain, chassis, engineering, and design. The V12 Vanquish was described as "The ultimate Grand Tourer" by Road & Track magazine. Car and Driver described the V12 Vanquish as "worthy of the marque's heritage and a serious alternative to the top Ferrari."

The V12 Vanquish series would become the last all-new model to be made in Aston Martin's Newport Pagnell facility. While the traditional craft techniques had evolved somewhat from those used to make the previous generation of cars, primarily in the panel shaping, there was still a great deal of work done by hand in assembly and finishing as each car was very time-consuming to manufacture.

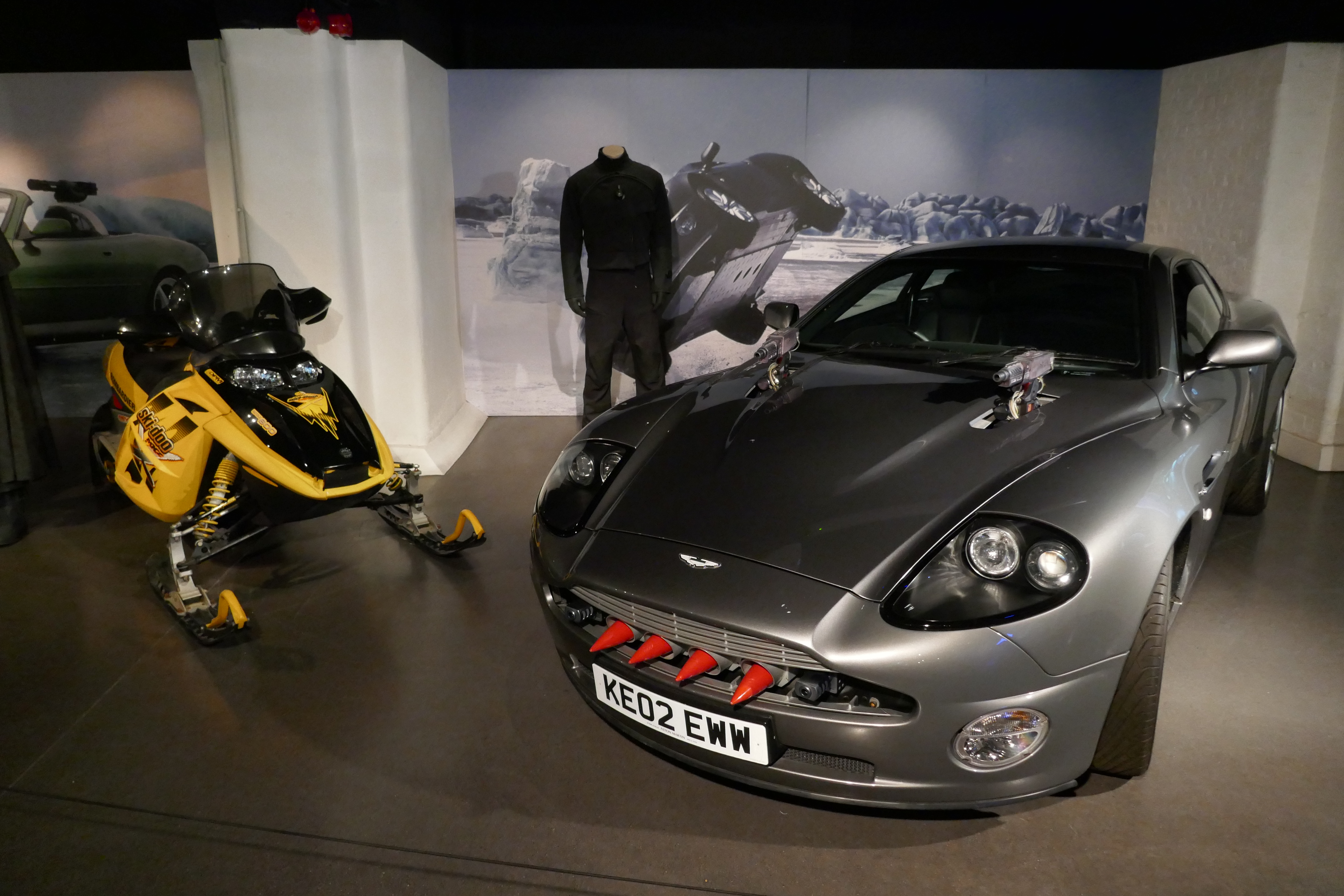
The V12 Vanquish featured in Die Another Day (2002)

Its appearance in the 2002 James Bond film Die Another Day earned the V12 Vanquish the number three spot on the list of Best Film Cars Ever, behind the Minis from The Italian Job, and the DB5 from Goldfinger and Thunderball. In the movie, James Bond receives this car from Q for his mission to Iceland to see Gustav Graves' presentation of Icarus after being reinstated by M and would eventually use the car to get away from Zao and rescue Jinx. The vehicle is equipped with a variety of gadgets which include machine guns and missiles on the grille, tire spikes for snow use, an ejector seat (that Bond uses to flip the car over after it was turned over by Zao), target seeking shotguns, as well as a cloaking device that renders the car effectively invisible.

The V12 Vanquish is the only Aston Martin car loaded with gadgets in the Pierce Brosnan James Bond era as the franchise's deal with BMW expired following The World Is Not Enough. It is also the last gadget loaded modern day Aston Martin car to appear in the James Bond franchise until the Aston Martin DB10 which appeared in Spectre, though it was not loaded with many gadgets. The first two Bond films that starred Daniel Craig had an Aston Martin DBS which was not loaded with gadgets, though the one that appeared in Casino Royale had a compartment that carried Bond's Walther P99 and a defibrillator. The V12 Vanquish also appears in video games namely Project Gotham Racing, Need For Speed: Hot Pursuit 2, James Bond 007: Nightfire, and James Bond 007: Everything or Nothing. In its appearance in Nightfire, the car is equipped with missiles, a smokescreen device, and could also transform into a submarine equipped with torpedoes. The V12 Vanquish was recognized, along with the DB4 GT Zagato, as one of the ten most beautiful cars of all time. The V12 Vanquish also appears in the 2003 The Italian Job remake where it is driven by the film's main antagonist Steve Frazelli, portrayed by actor Edward Norton.

=== V12 Vanquish S (2004–2007) ===
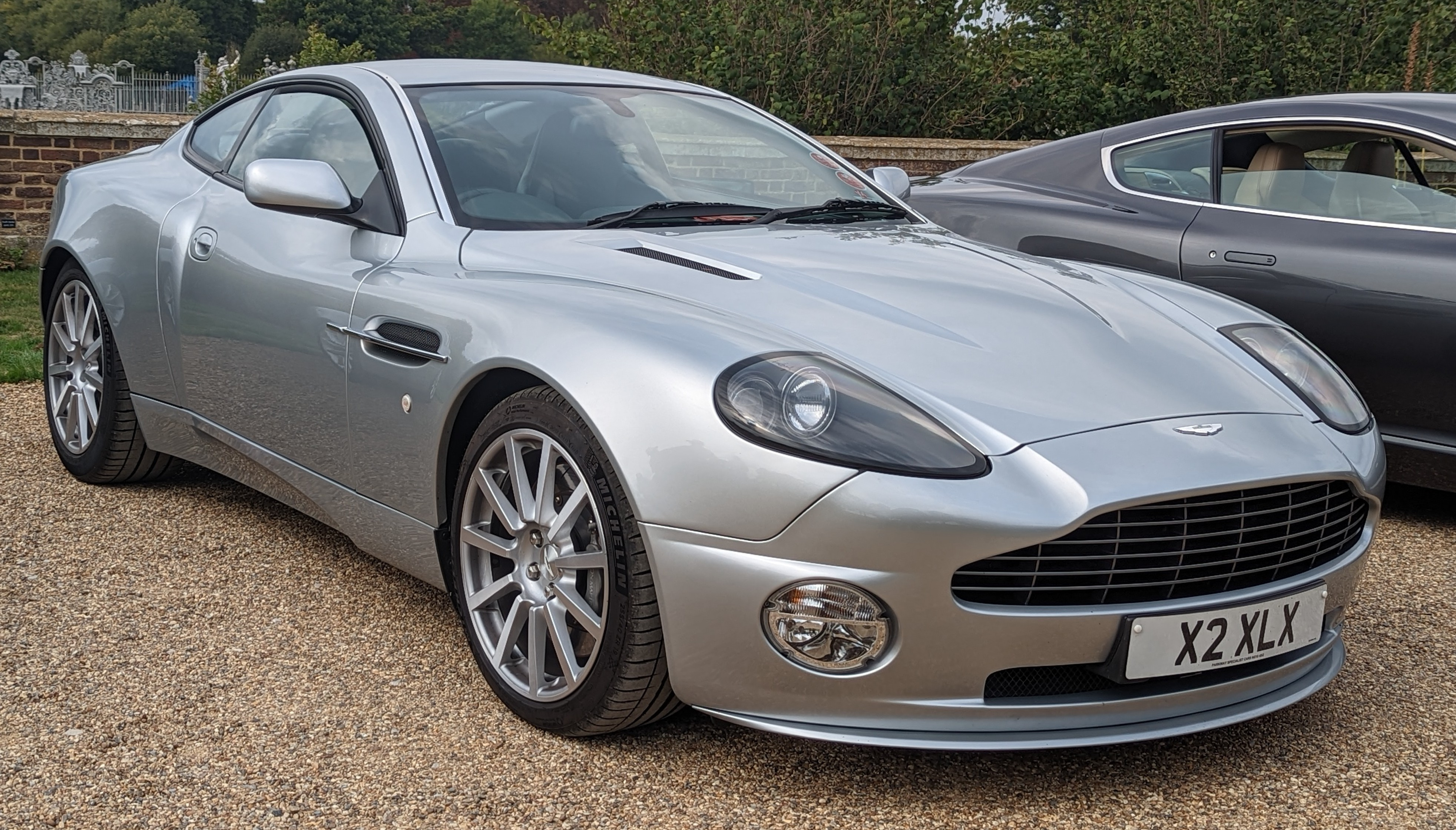
Aston Martin Vanquish S front view

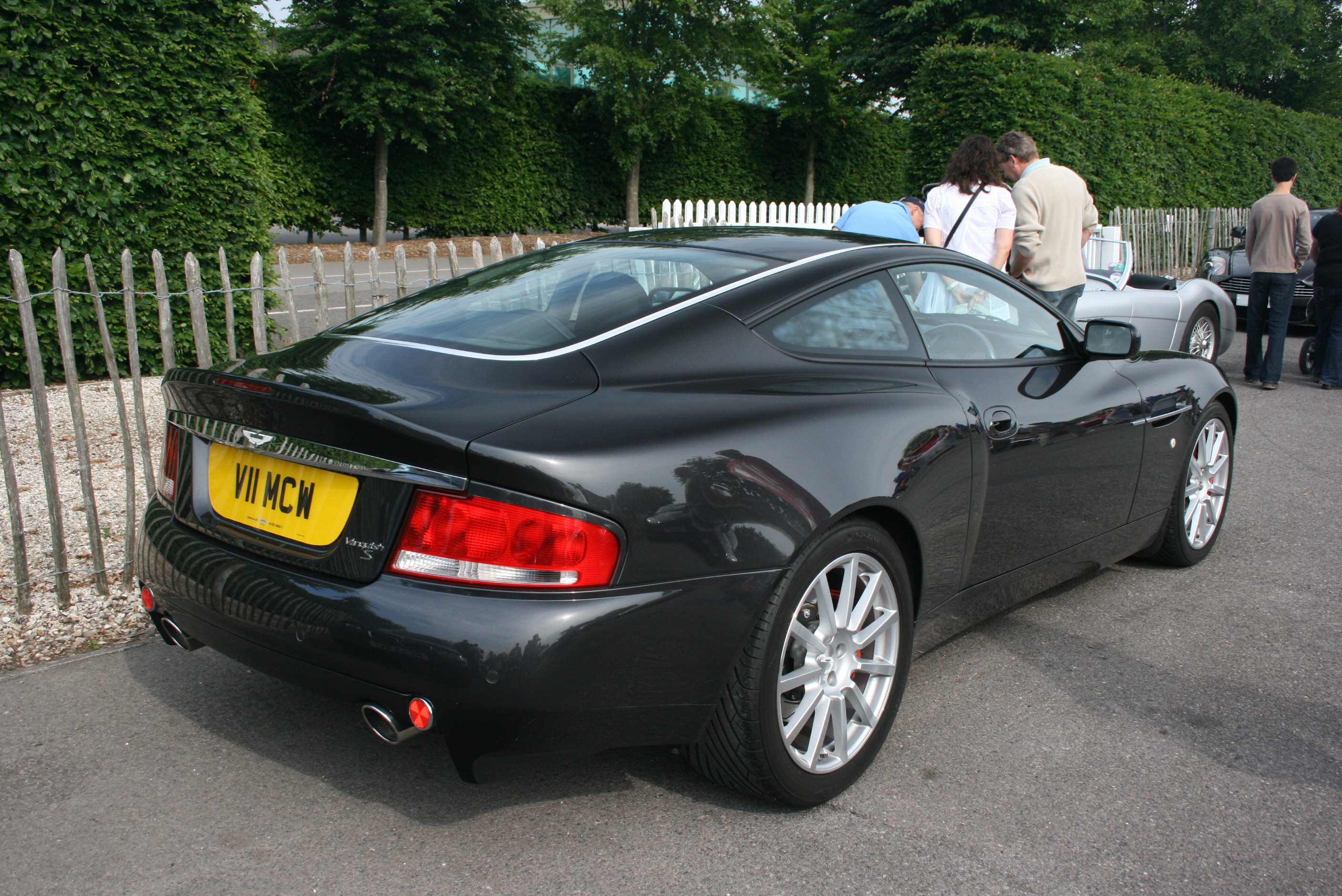
Aston Martin Vanquish S rear view

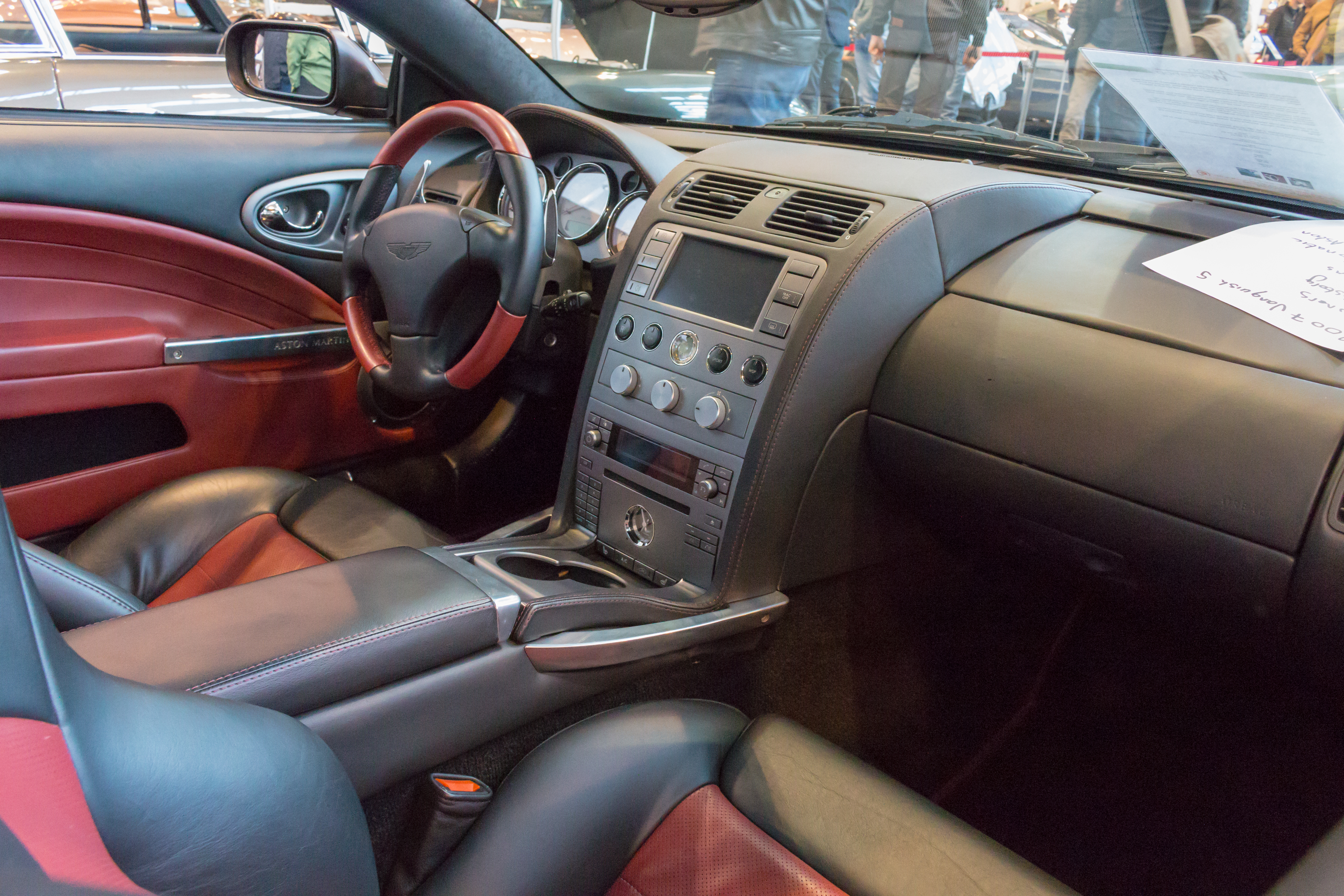
Aston Martin Vanquish S interior

The Aston Martin V12 Vanquish S debuted at the 2004 Paris Motor Show, with a number of subtle styling revisions. The engine displacement remained at 5,935 cc (5.9 L; 362.2 cu in), but power output increased from 343 kW; 460 hp (466 PS) to 388 kW; 520 hp (527 PS). Torque also increased from 400 lb⋅ft (542 N⋅m) to 426 lb⋅ft (578 N⋅m).

Visual changes included new wheels, a slightly different nose shape, a new raised boot lid with a larger integrated spoiler incorporating the third high-level brake light (in the rear window on the original Vanquish), a Vanquish S badge on the boot lid (the original Vanquish had no rear model designation), and the addition of a small front splitter. One result of these changes was a reduction in the drag coefficient from Cd=0.33 to Cd=0.32. The V12 Vanquish S front and rear track measured 1,524 mm (60.0 in) and 1,529 mm (60.2 in), respectively. A change in gear ratio enabled the car to reach a top speed of 322 km/h (200 mph), and accelerate from 0–60 mph (0–97 km/h) in 4.2 seconds.

The V12 Vanquish S also incorporated the features of the optional Sports Dynamic Package (available for the Vanquish for the 2004 model year), which included stiffer suspension, revised steering, and larger brakes – 378 mm (14.9 in) front discs with six-piston calipers and 330 mm (13.0 in) rear discs with four-piston calipers. The V12 Vanquish S was sold for the 2005 model year alongside the original Vanquish, and 2006 onward as a stand-alone model. The 2007 model year V12 Vanquish was not sold in the United States.

=== Special editions and one-offs ===
==== Vanquish S Ultimate Edition ====
The end of the Vanquish's production run was celebrated with the Vanquish S Ultimate Edition. Aston Martin announced that the last 50 cars built would have a new 'Ultimate Black' exterior colour, upgraded interior, and personalised sill plaques.

==== Vanquish Zagato Roadster ====
The Vanquish Zagato Roadster is a one-off model, based on the V12 Vanquish, and restyled by Zagato as a two-seat, open-top roadster. It was initially shown at the 2004 International Geneva Motor Show as a prototype. It was then displayed by Zagato at the 2004 Pebble Beach Concours d'Elegance, where an American collector acquired the prototype. The car had to be flown back to Italy as it was only on temporary import papers before being properly imported to the US by a Massachusetts Aston Martin dealer as a "show and display" car. The car was offered at a Bonhams auction in Carmel in August 2015 at the Quail Lodge and Golf Club with an estimated price of US$700,000–850,000. The car had been driven 13,000 miles. The car's VIN is SCFAC13391B50PP19.

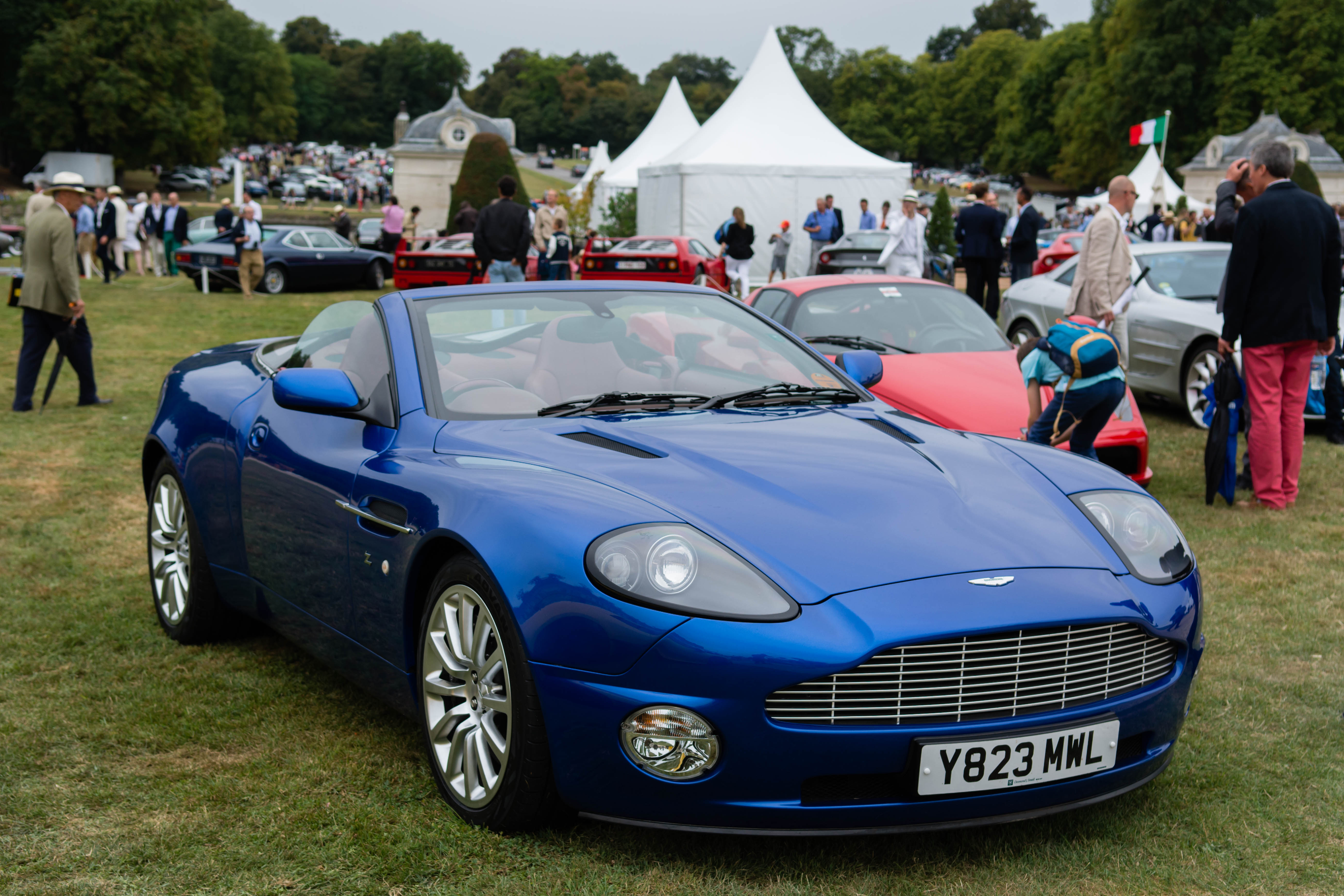
Front right view

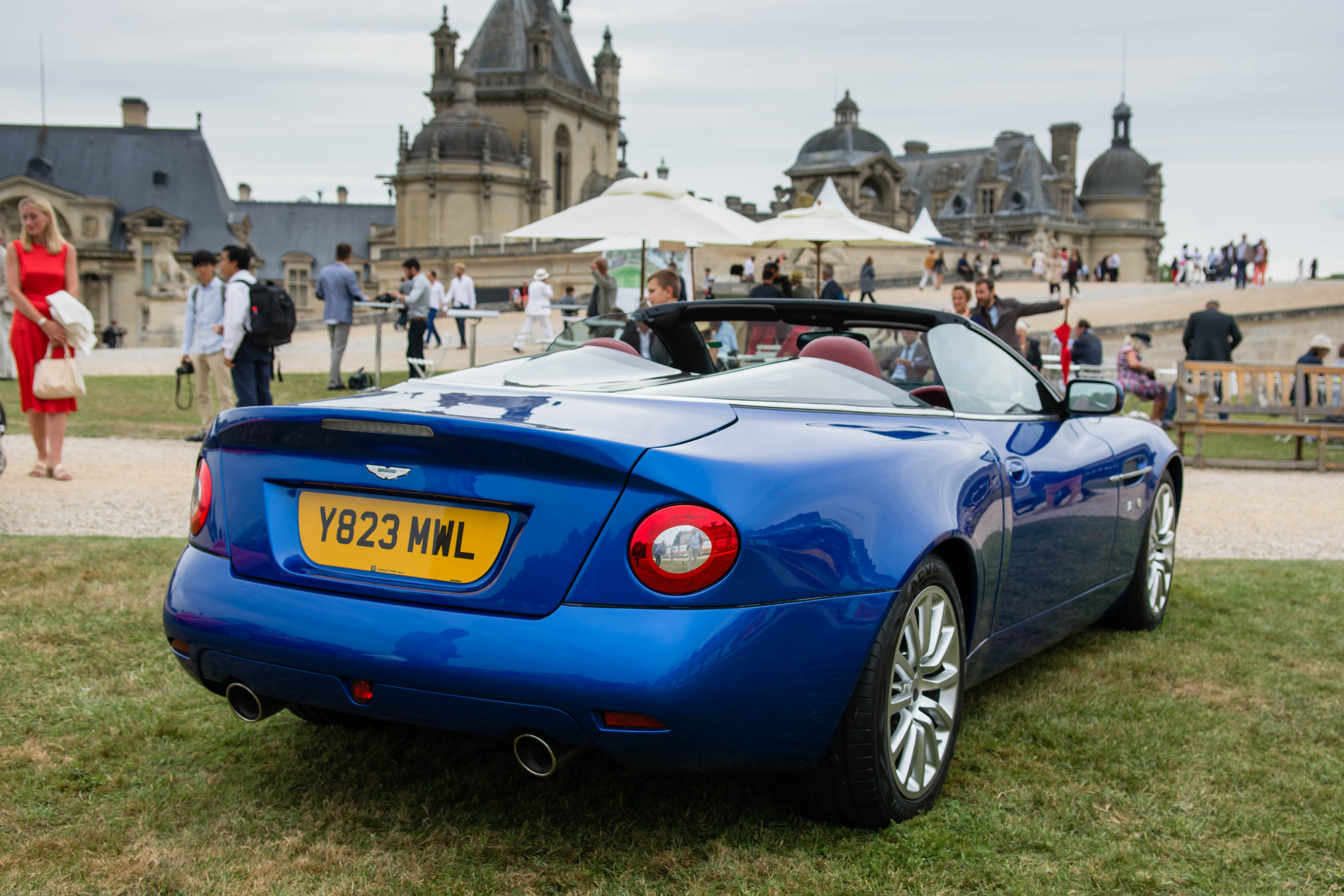
Back right view

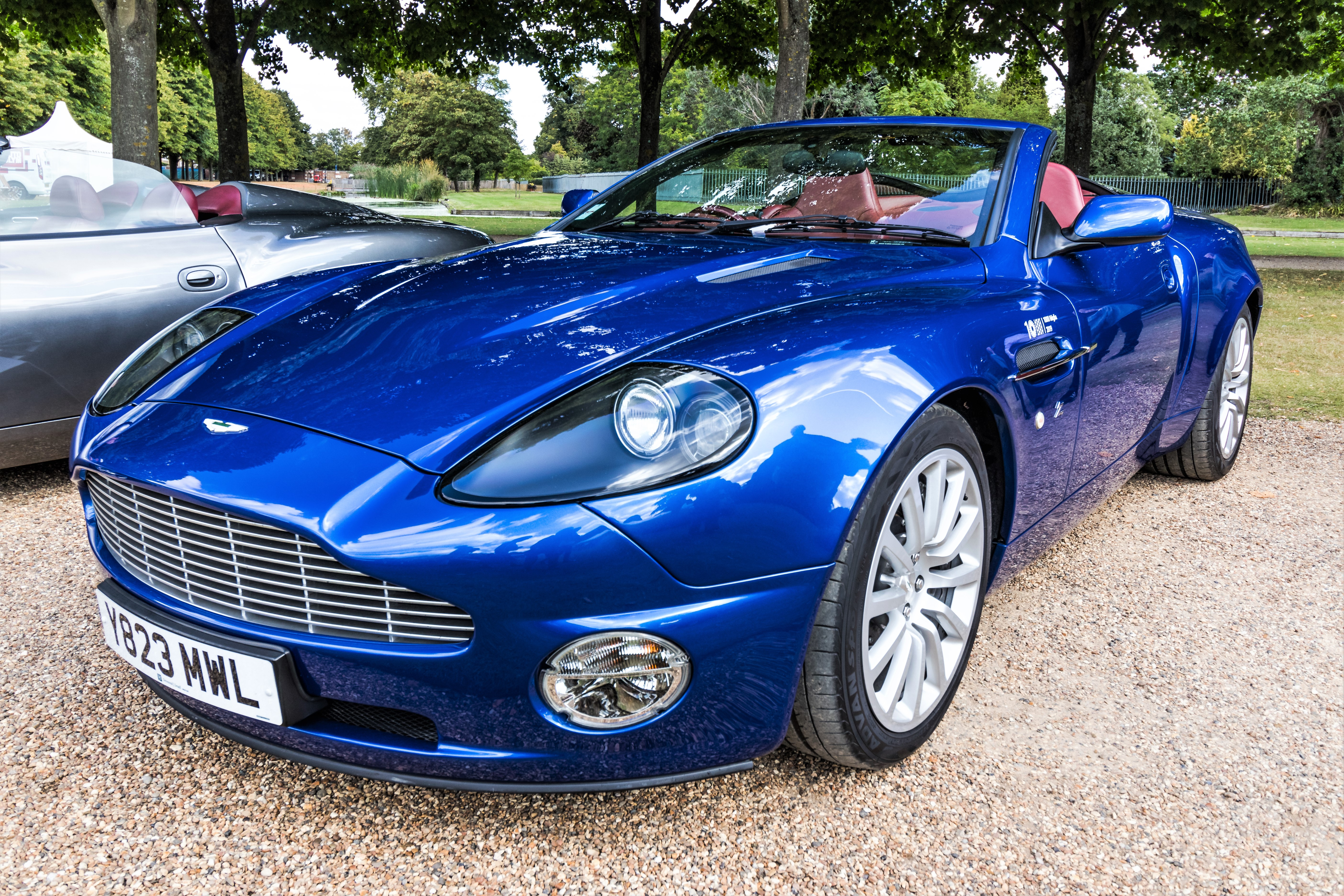
Front left view

==== Vanquish Bertone Jet 2 ====
The Vanquish Bertone Jet 2 is a 2-door shooting brake shown by Bertone also at the 2004 International Geneva Motor Show. The car gets its name from the 1960 Aston Martin DB4 GT Jet also built by Bertone. The car was originally shown in silver in 2004 and in gold in 2013 again at the International Geneva Motor Show at the reveal of the Aston Martin Rapide Bertone Jet 2+2. It was designed by Giuliano Biasio at Bertone.

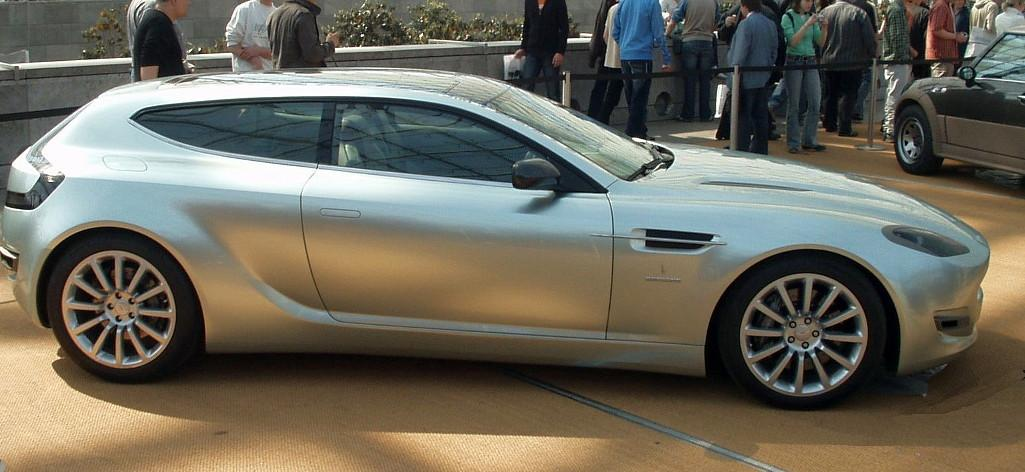

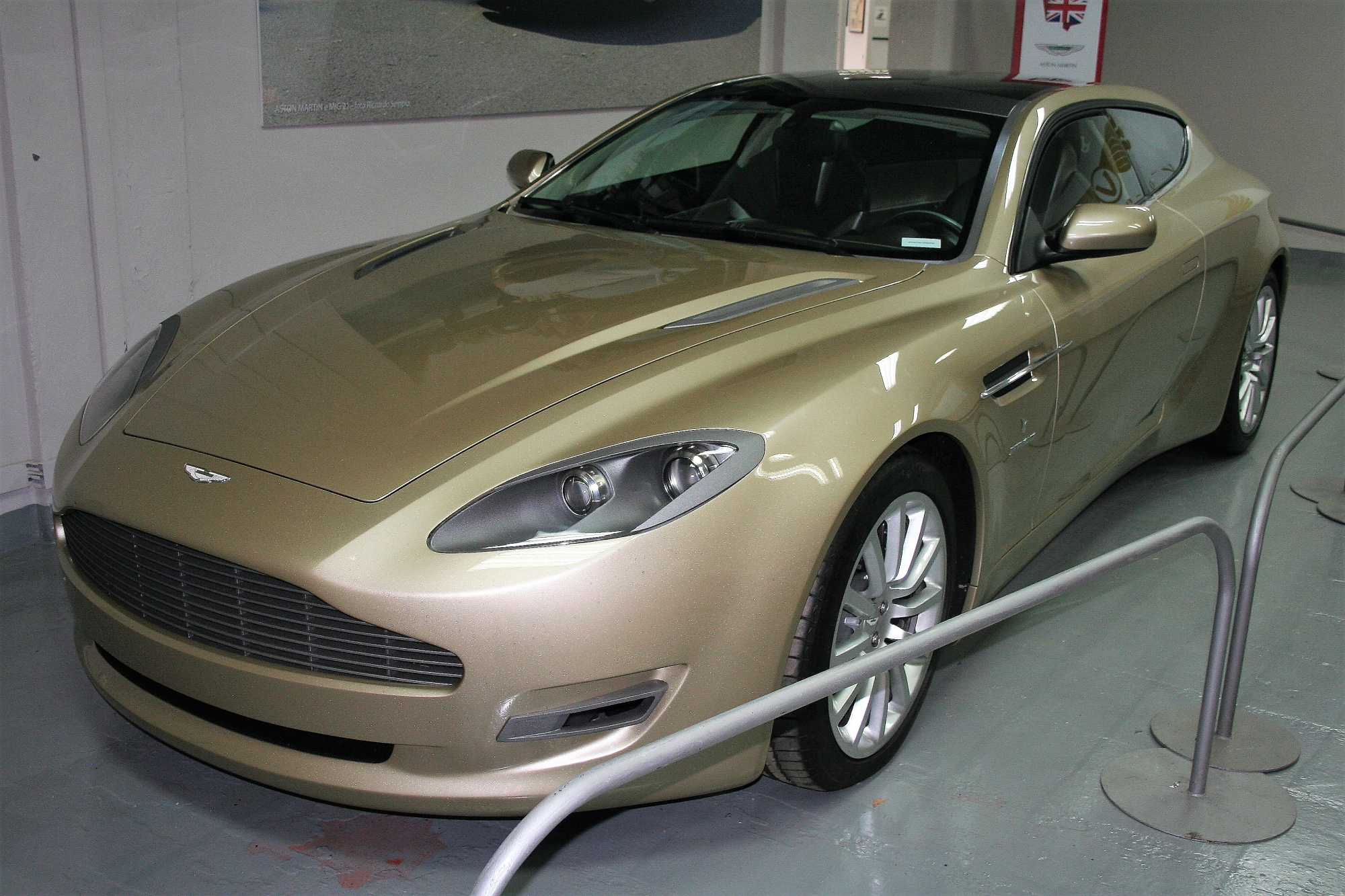

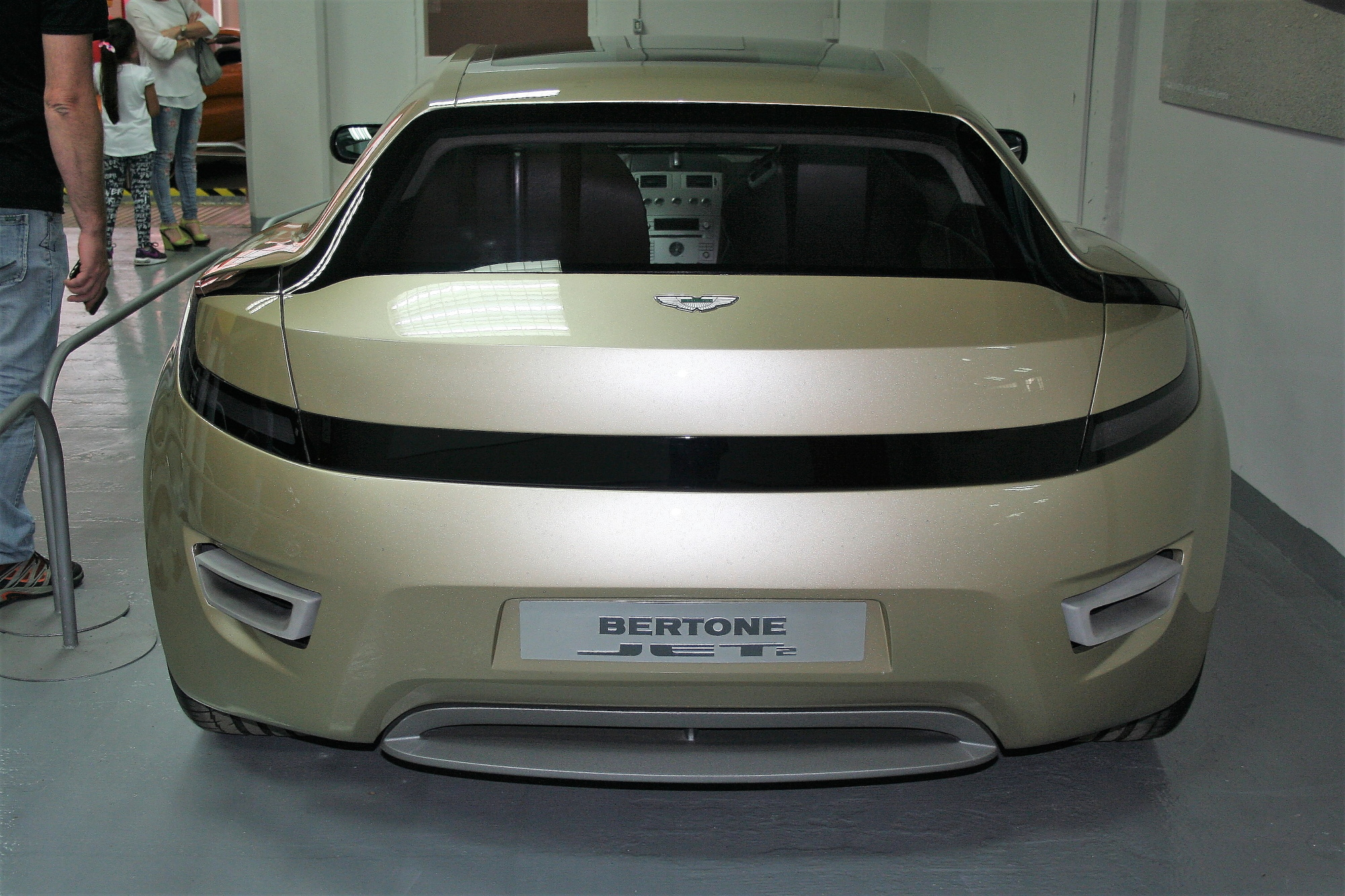

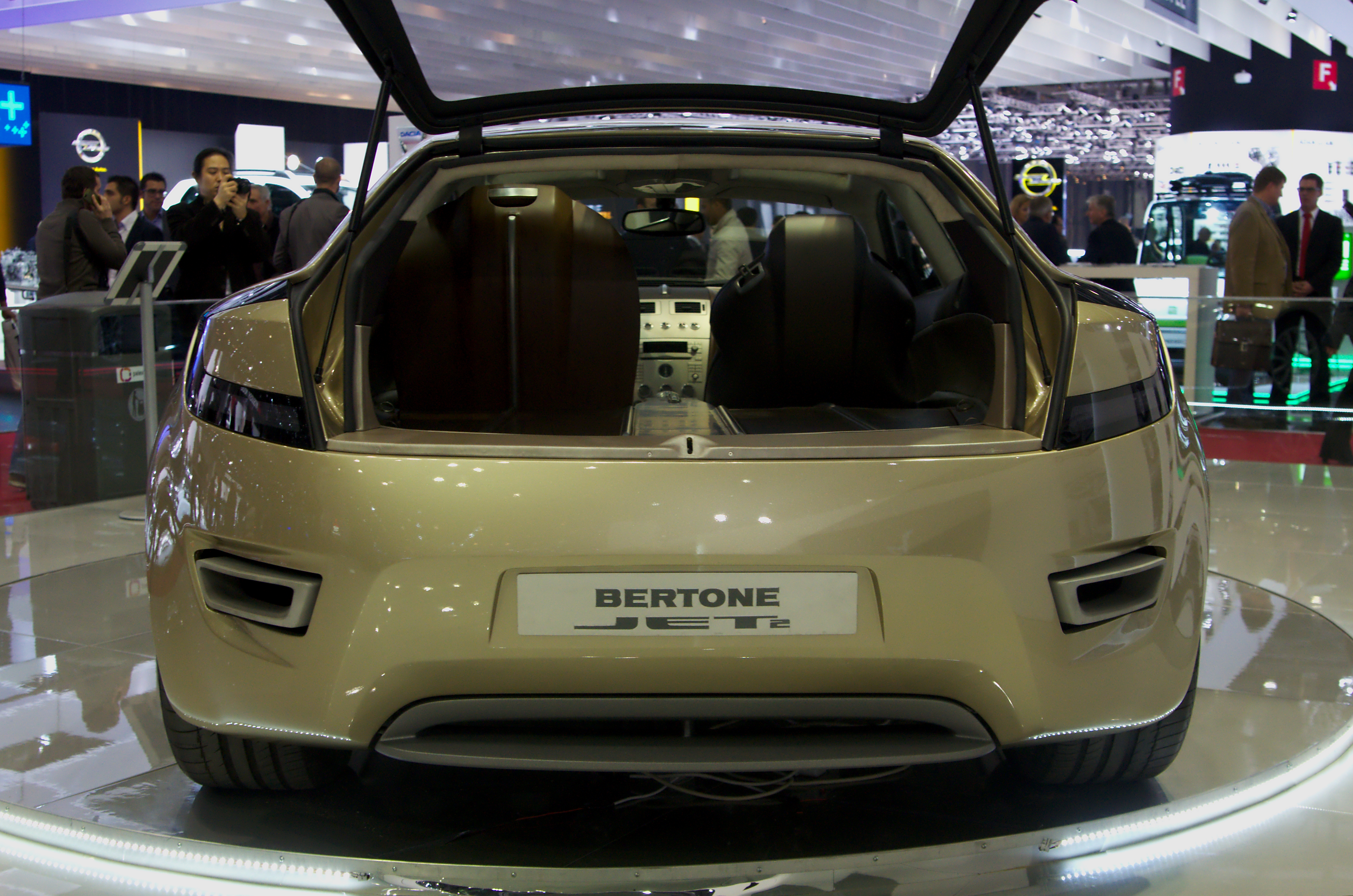

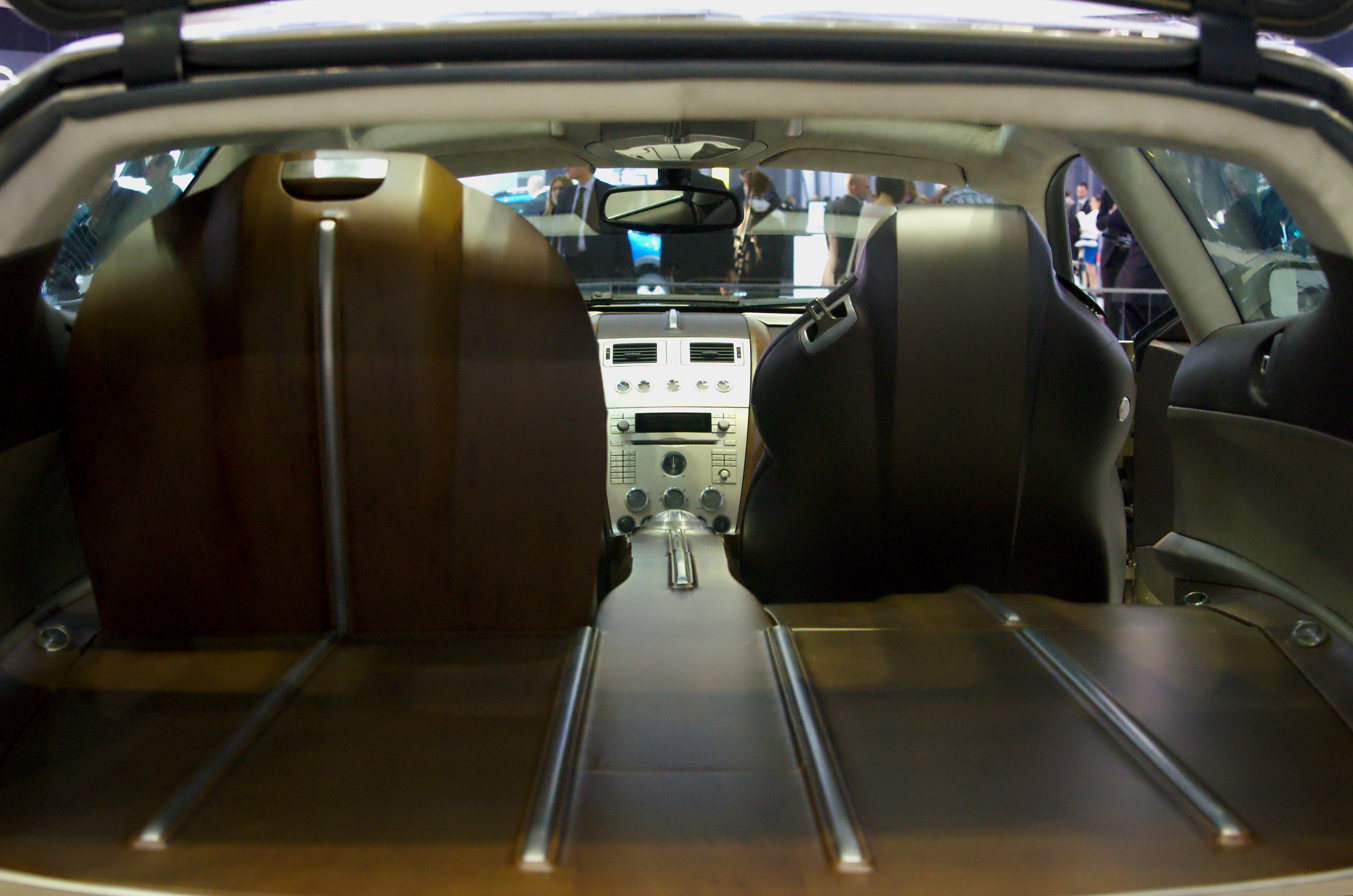

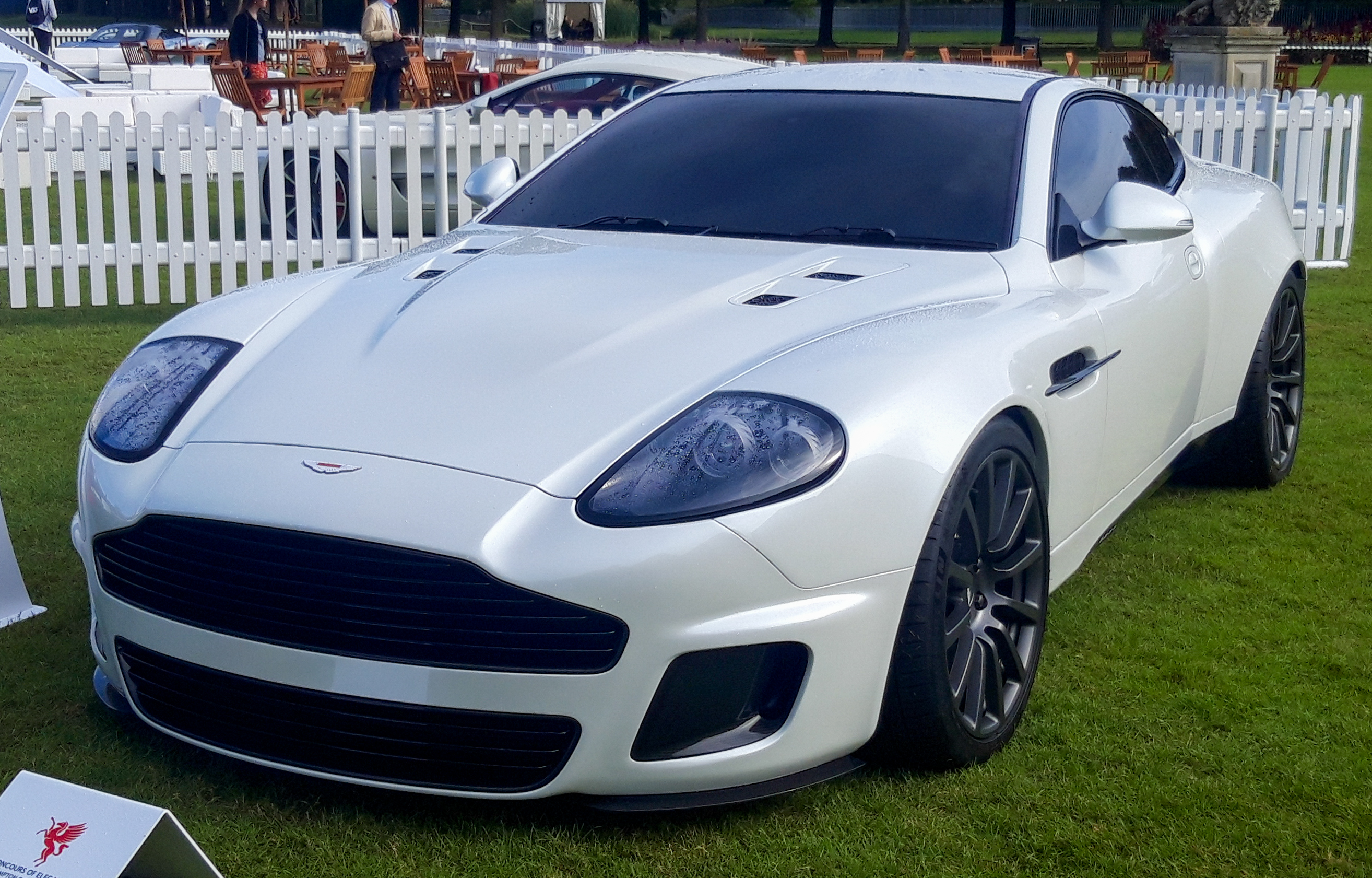
Vanquish 25

==== Vanquish 25 by Ian Callum Design ====
In September 2019, Ian Callum Design (the company started by Ian Callum, the designer of the first generation Vanquish) publicly revealed the Vanquish 25. It is a restoration package for the first generation Vanquish to "make the Vanquish the Grand Tourer for the 2020s". Only 25 cars will be made by British company R-Reforged. The 5.9-litre V12 has been tuned to now make an advertised 432 kW; 580 hp (588 PS), a 45 kW (60 hp) increase over the Vanquish S. The car can be had with the original six-speed, single-clutch Speedshift automated manual, a six-speed GM-sourced torque converter automatic, or a six-speed manual conversion already offered by Aston Martin Works.

=== Technical specifications ===
Model	Year	Engine displacement	Transmission	Max. power (at rpm)	Max. torque (at rpm)	Max. speed	Acceleration 0–60 mph (0–97 km/h)
V12 Vanquish	2001–2004	5.9 litres (5,935 cc)	6-speed automated manual	343 kW; 460 hp (466 PS) at 6,500	400 lb⋅ft (542 N⋅m) at 5,000	306 km/h (190 mph)	4.5 seconds
V12 Vanquish S	2004–2007	5.9 litres (5,935 cc)	6-speed automated manual	388 kW; 520 hp (527 PS) at 7,000	426 lb⋅ft (578 N⋅m) at 5,000	322 km/h (200 mph)	4.2 seconds

=== End of production ===
The production of the V12 Vanquish ended on 19 July 2007, coinciding with the closing of the company's Newport Pagnell factory after 49 years of operation. Despite ongoing enthusiasm for the original V12 Vanquish and V12 Vanquish S, the hand made nature of their construction limited production to levels commensurate with earlier cars assembled at Newport Pagnell.

== Second generation (2012–2018) ==
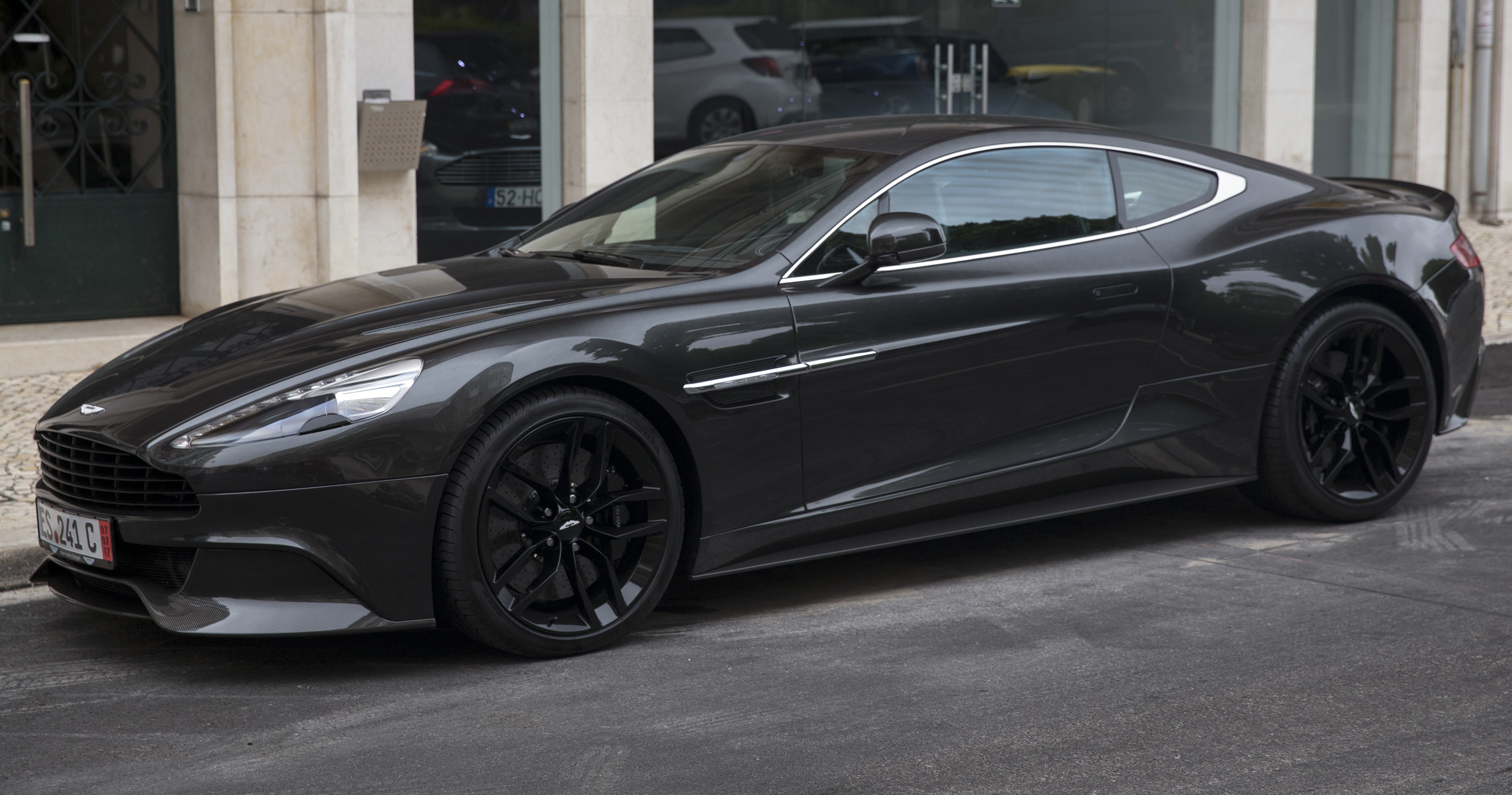
2015 model

The second-generation Gaydon-built "Vanquish" (the "V12" part of the name was dropped for this generation of cars) started life as the Project AM310 Concept and was unveiled at the 2012 Concorso d'Eleganza Villa d'Este held on the shores of Lake Como, Italy. The concept car was based on the latest generation of the VH platform that had debuted in the DB9, and then evolved into the V8 and V12 Vantage, DBS, Virage V12, and Rapide. It was internally known as project VH310. It included a tweaked version of Aston Martin's familiar grille and headlight design and a more pronounced bulge in the bonnet – with One-77-inspired flourishes saved for the sides and the rear, the side vents run almost to the door handles (shared with the One-77), new rear light design shared with the One-77, and a 5.9-litre V12 engine that has a power output of 410 kW; 550 hp (558 PS). Aston Martin later announced that the concept would be put into production as the all-new Vanquish.

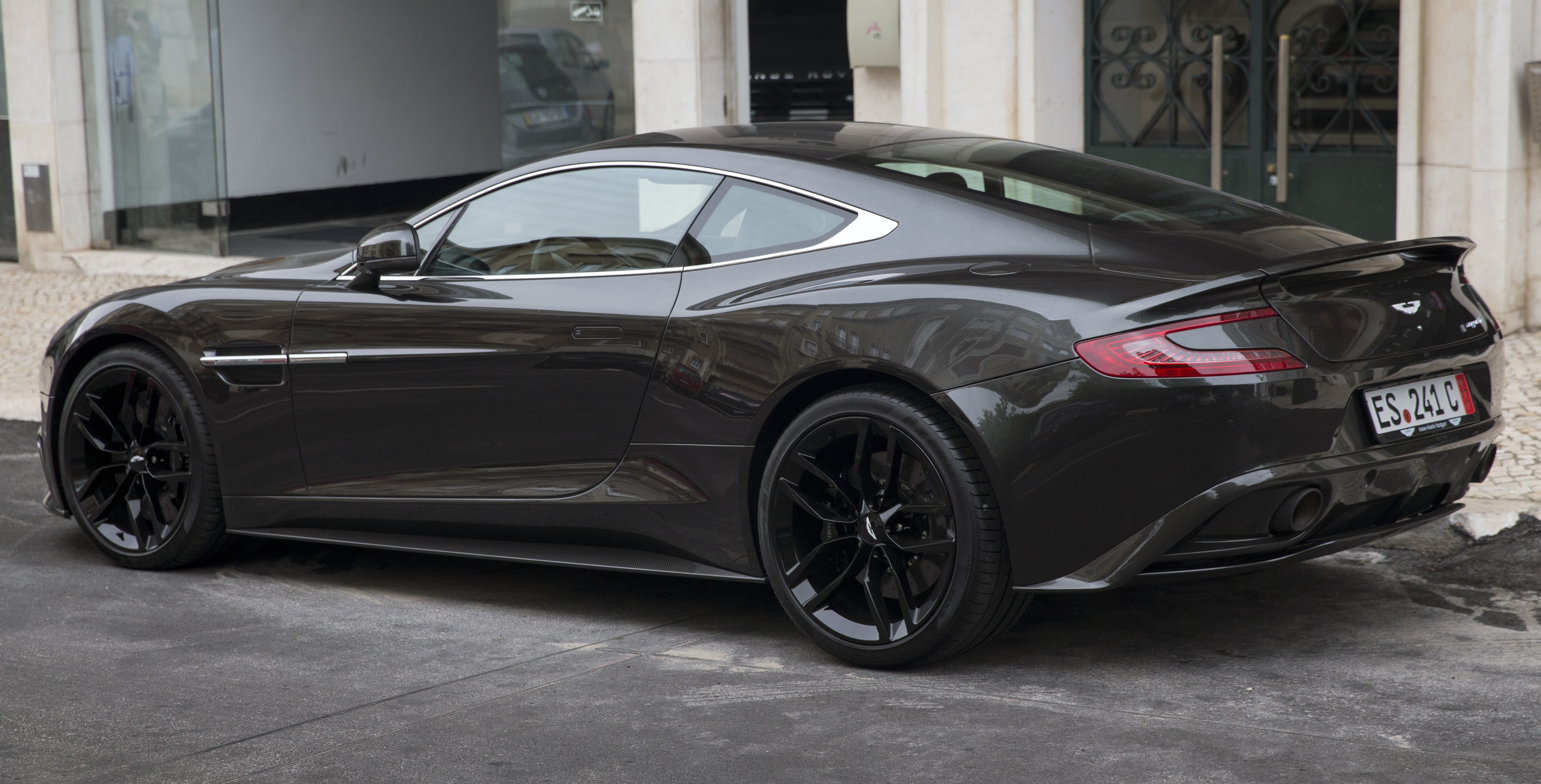
2015 model

The Vanquish used an upgraded version of Aston Martin's 5.9-litre V12 engine with a power output of 421 kW; 565 hp (573 PS) at 6,750 rpm and torque of 620 N⋅m (457 lb⋅ft) at 5,500 rpm. The Vanquish can accelerate from 0 to 100 km/h (62 mph) in 4.1 seconds, and has a top speed of 295 km/h (183 mph). Like the DB9 and other VH platform Aston Martin automobiles, the engine is front-mounted with the transmission in the rear for better weight distribution. The Vanquish has 51/49 front/rear weight distribution, and a kerb weight of 1,739 kg (3,834 lb). It uses a fully catalysed stainless steel exhaust system with active bypass valves. The 2012–2014 cars use an updated ZF Touchtronic II six-speed automatic gearbox, which was then further replaced by an updated ZF Touchtronic III eight-speed automatic gearbox starting with the 2015 model year. It was the first Aston Martin model to be available with launch control. The combined space of cabin and a boot that, at 368 litres, is more than 60% larger than that of the DBS.

In 2013, Aston Martin unveiled a convertible variant of the Vanquish, called Volante. The Volante has a full carbon fibre body, triple-skin lightweight fabric roof, 50% larger boot than its predecessor and the third generation Brembo 398 mm × 36 mm (front) and 360 mm × 32 mm (rear) Carbon Ceramic Matrix (CCM) brake discs with six-piston front and four-piston rear brake callipers. The Vanquish Volante is 13% torsionally stiffer than the outgoing DBS Volante. On 16 November 2016, Aston Martin announced the new Vanquish S model. The Vanquish S features the AM29 V12 engine, with power increased to 444 kW; 595 hp (603 PS), and a new aerodynamic package. The Vanquish S can accelerate from 0 to 100 km/h (62 mph) in 3.5 seconds with a top speed of 201 mph (324 km/h). The car's deliveries started in December 2016. Aston Martin also unveiled a convertible version of the Vanquish S called the Vanquish S Volante in 2017.

For the 2018 model year, Aston Martin built a limited run of 12 Volantes, named the Tom Brady Signature Edition. These were hand made by the Q division, featuring unique wheels, special paint and options, and TB12 badges.

== Third generation (2024–present) ==
Third generation
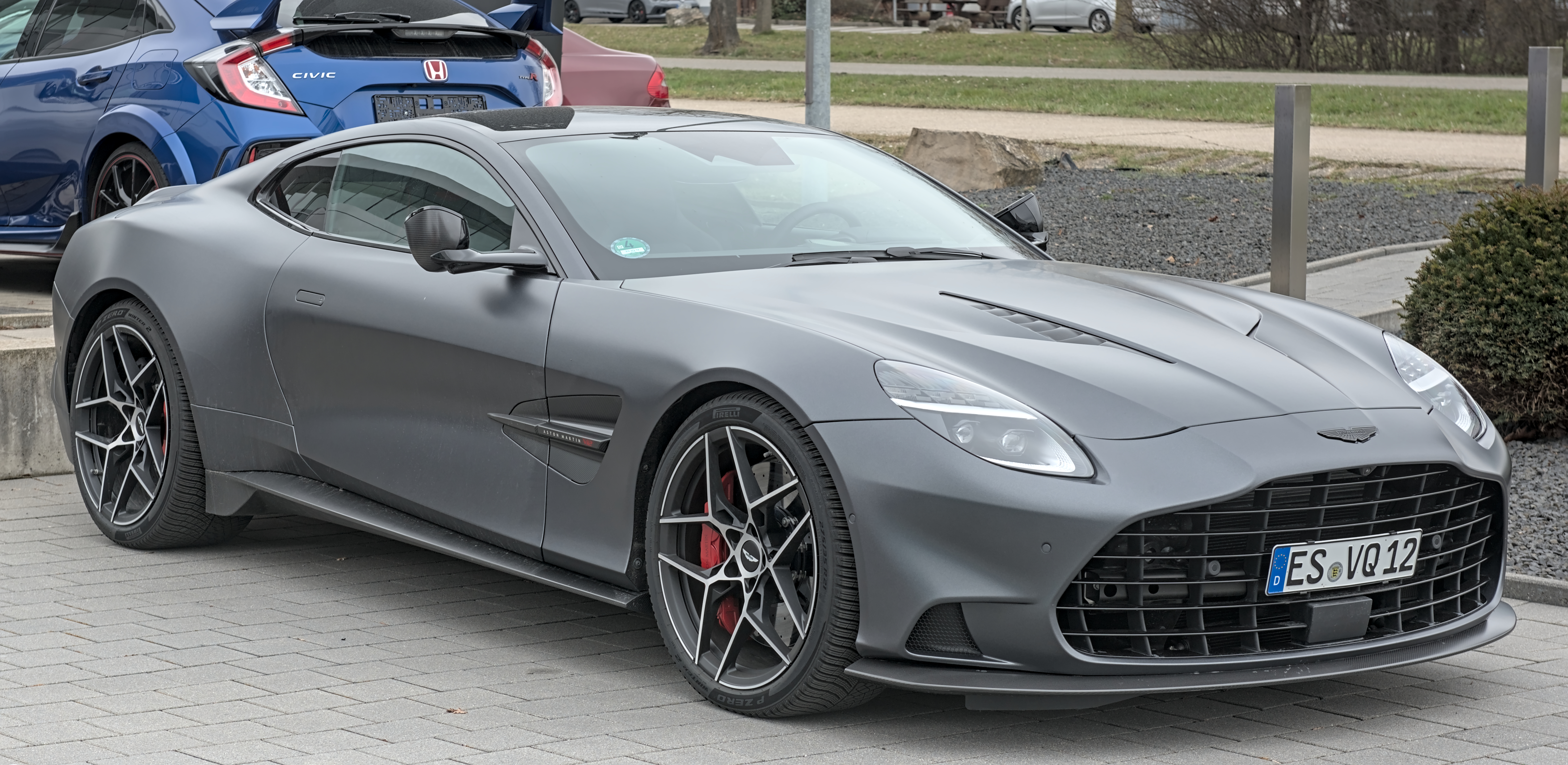

Overview
- Production: 2024–present
- Assembly: United Kingdom: Gaydon, Warwickshire
- Designer: Marek Reichman

Body and chassis
- Class: Grand tourer (S)
- Body style: 2-door coupé; 2-door convertible
- Layout: Front mid-engine, rear-wheel-drive
- Doors: Swan
- Related: Aston Martin DB12; Aston Martin Vantage (2018); Aston Martin Valen; Brabus Bodo

Powertrain
- Engine: 5.2 L AE31 twin-turbo V12
- Power output: 835 PS (614 kW; 824 hp)
- Transmission: 8-speed ZF 8HP95 automatic

Dimensions
- Wheelbase: 2,885 mm (113.6 in)
- Length: 4,850 mm (190.9 in)
- Width: 2,044 mm (80.5 in)
- Height: 1,290 mm (50.8 in)
- Kerb weight: 1,774 kg (3,911 lb) (Coupé) 1,869 kg (4,120 lb) (Volante)

Chronology
- Predecessor: Aston Martin DBS Superleggera

On 2 September 2024, Aston Martin unveiled the third-generation Vanquish, powered by a new twin-turbo 5.2-litre V12, mated to an eight-speed ZF gearbox. The V12 has been completely re-engineered from the original, which debuted in the DB11 in 2016, featuring a new block, heads, intakes, exhaust ports, and turbochargers. It now produces 835 PS (614 kW; 824 hp) and 1,001 N⋅m (738 lb⋅ft) of torque. The same engine is used in the Valour and Valiant models, using different calibrations strategies to achieve the target performance levels.

The car uses a modified version of the platform that underpins the DB12 and Vantage, with a longer wheelbase to accommodate the larger V12 engine. At 1,774 kg (3,911 lb), it is 89 kg (196 lb) heavier than the DB12. The third-generation Vanquish accelerates from 0–100 km/h (0–62 mph) in 3.2 seconds, and has a top speed of 214 mph (344 km/h). Production of the third-generation will be limited to under 1,000 units each year.

Aston Martin unveiled a convertible version of the Vanquish, called the Vanquish Volante, on 25 March 2025. With a kerb weight of 1,869 kg (4,120 lb), the Volante is 95 kg (209 lb) heavier than the coupé. The Volante accelerates from 0–100 km/h (0–62 mph) in 3.4 seconds, and has the same top speed as the coupé of 214 mph (344 km/h).

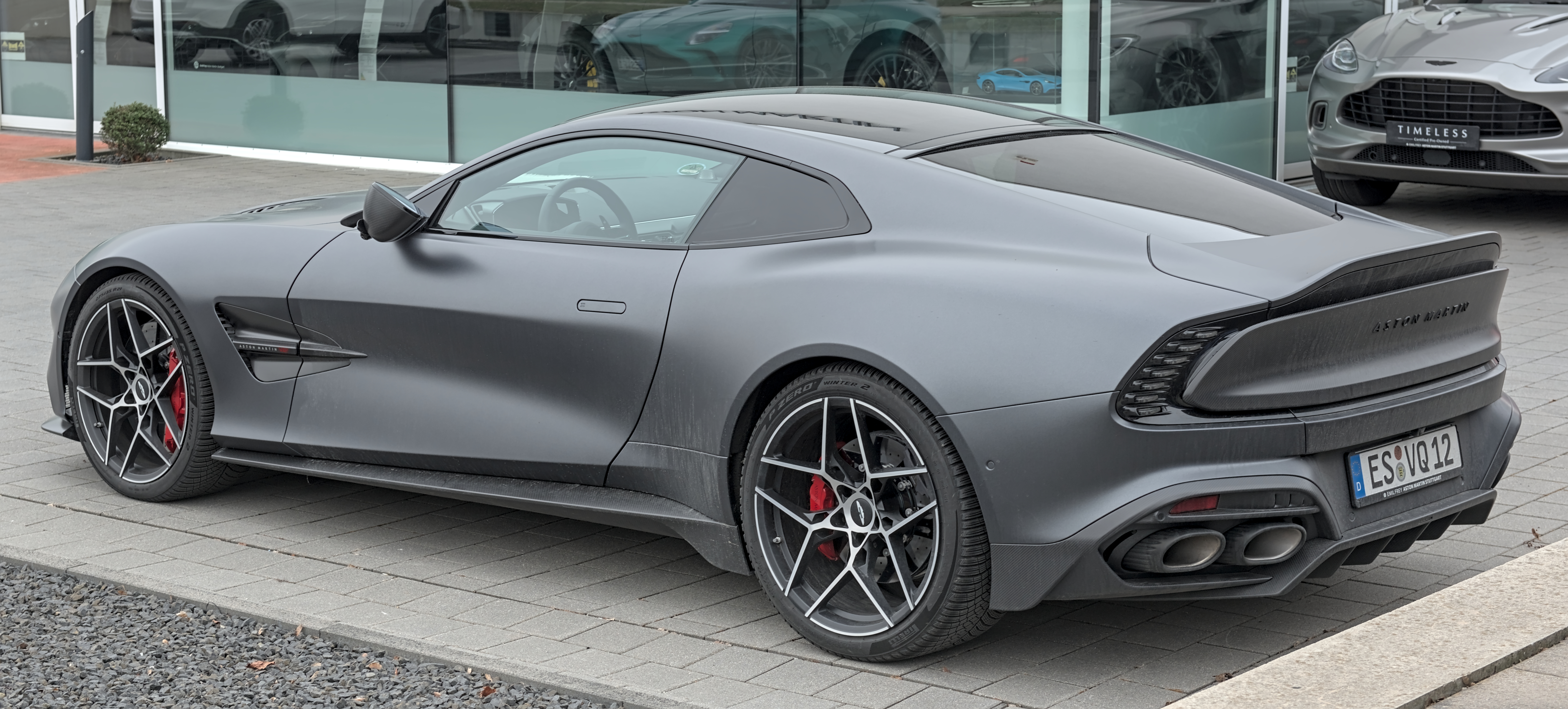
Rear of 2024 Vanquish

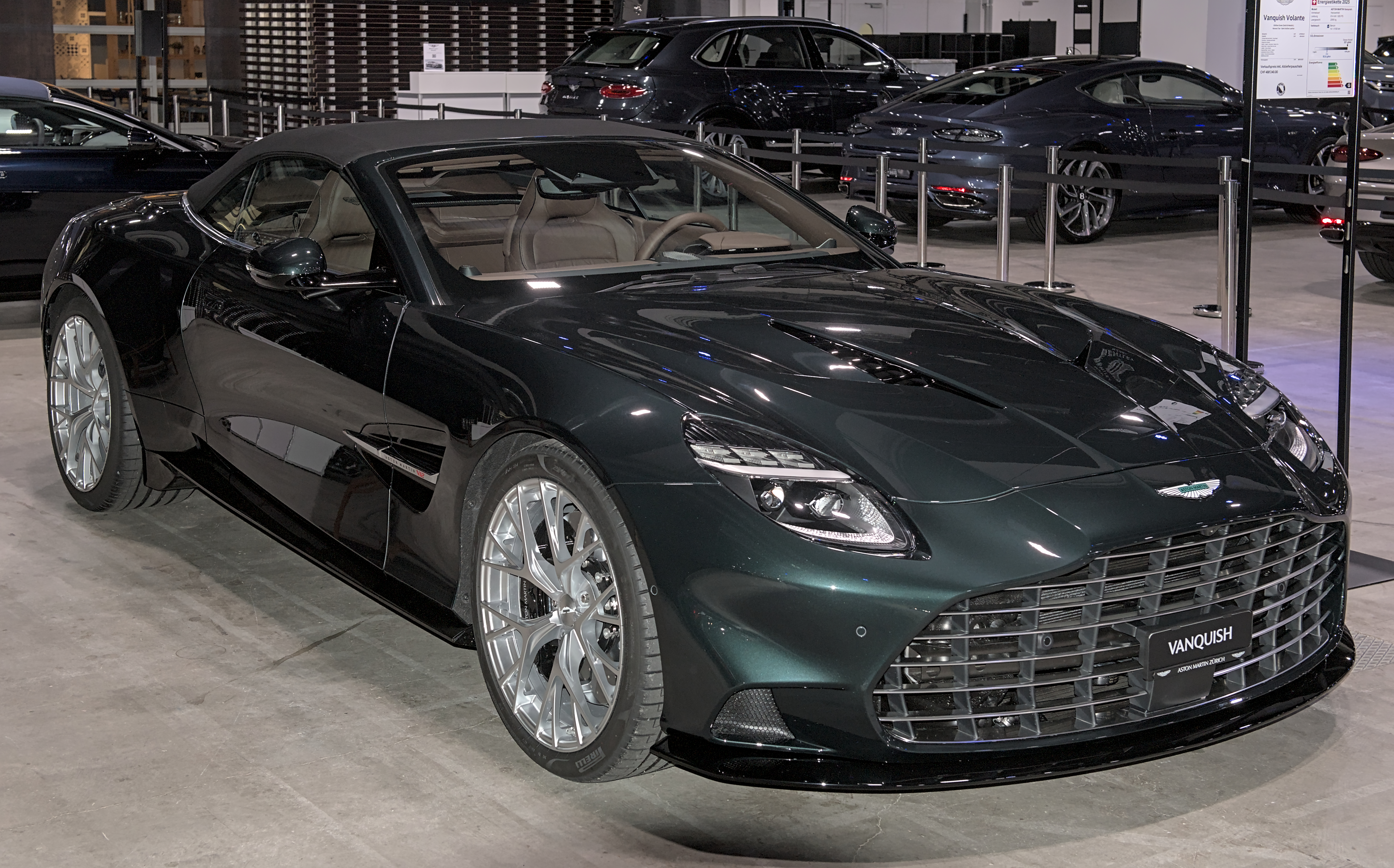
Vanquish Volante

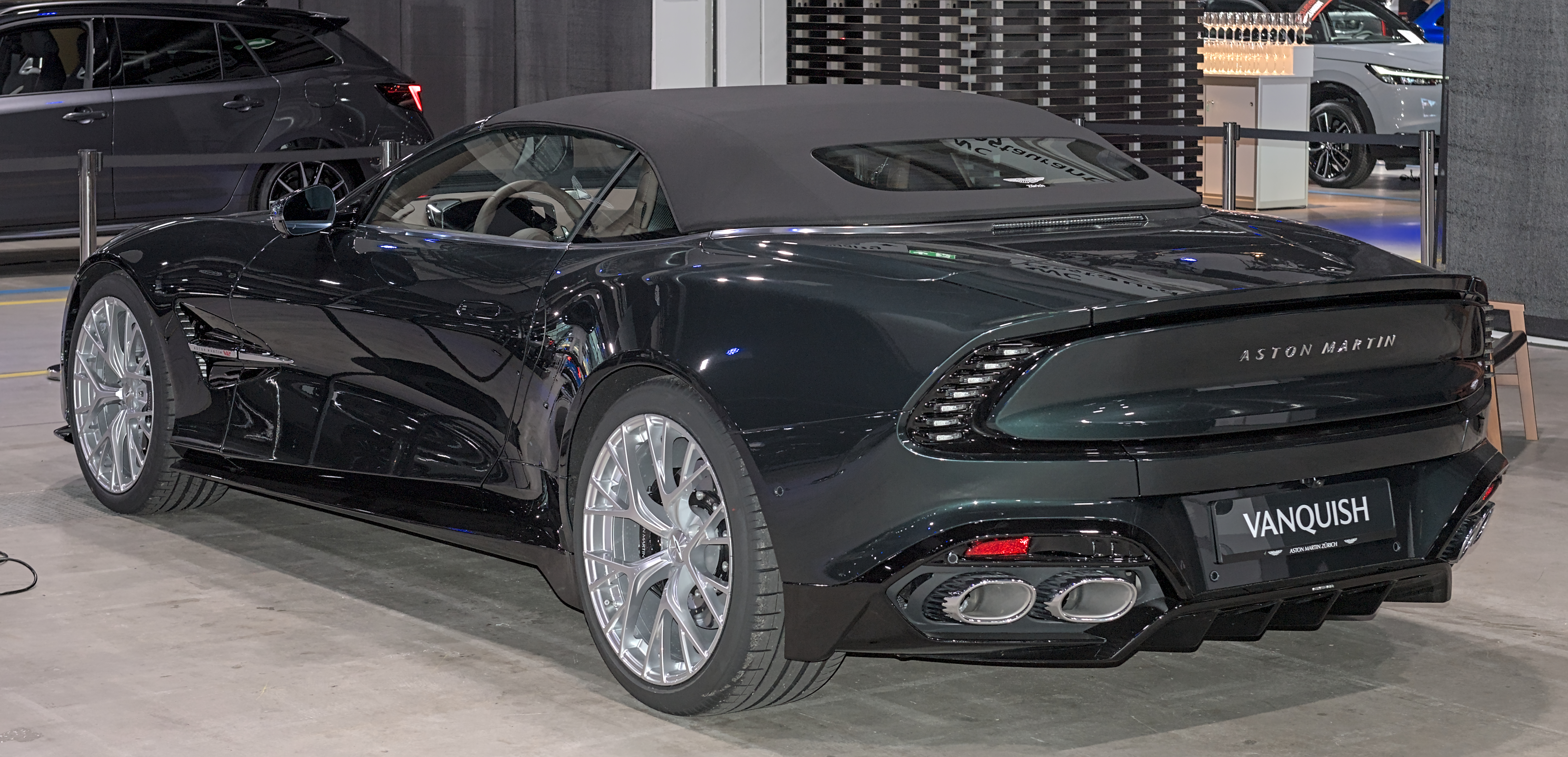
Vanquish Volante (rear view)

== Vanquish Vision Concept ==
The proposed third generation concept car was unveiled at the 2019 Geneva Motor Show. It features a rear mid-engine layout, aluminium bonded chassis and a new 3.0-litre V6 engine that can develop over 520 kW; 700 hp (710 PS). The production car would have been in the same market segment as the Ferrari F8 Tributo and McLaren 720S. The mid-engined Vanquish was originally planned to enter production in 2023, but was eventually cancelled.

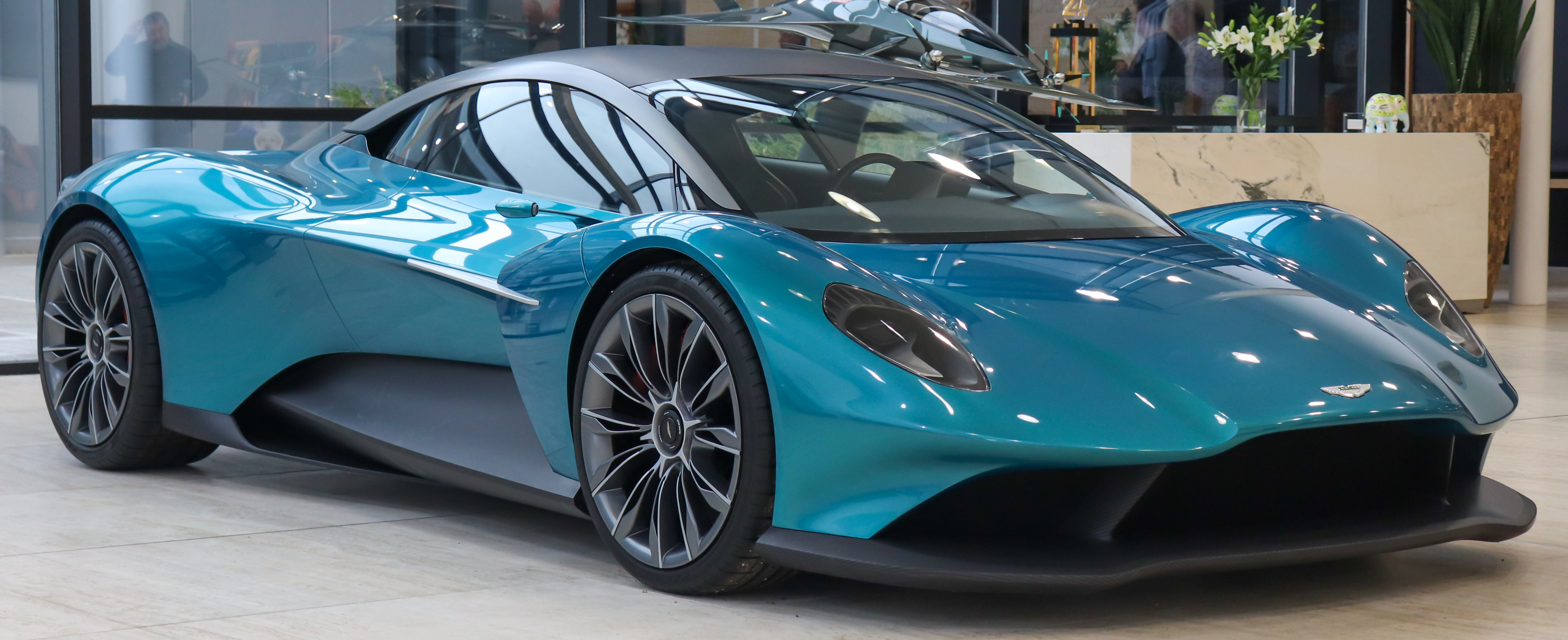

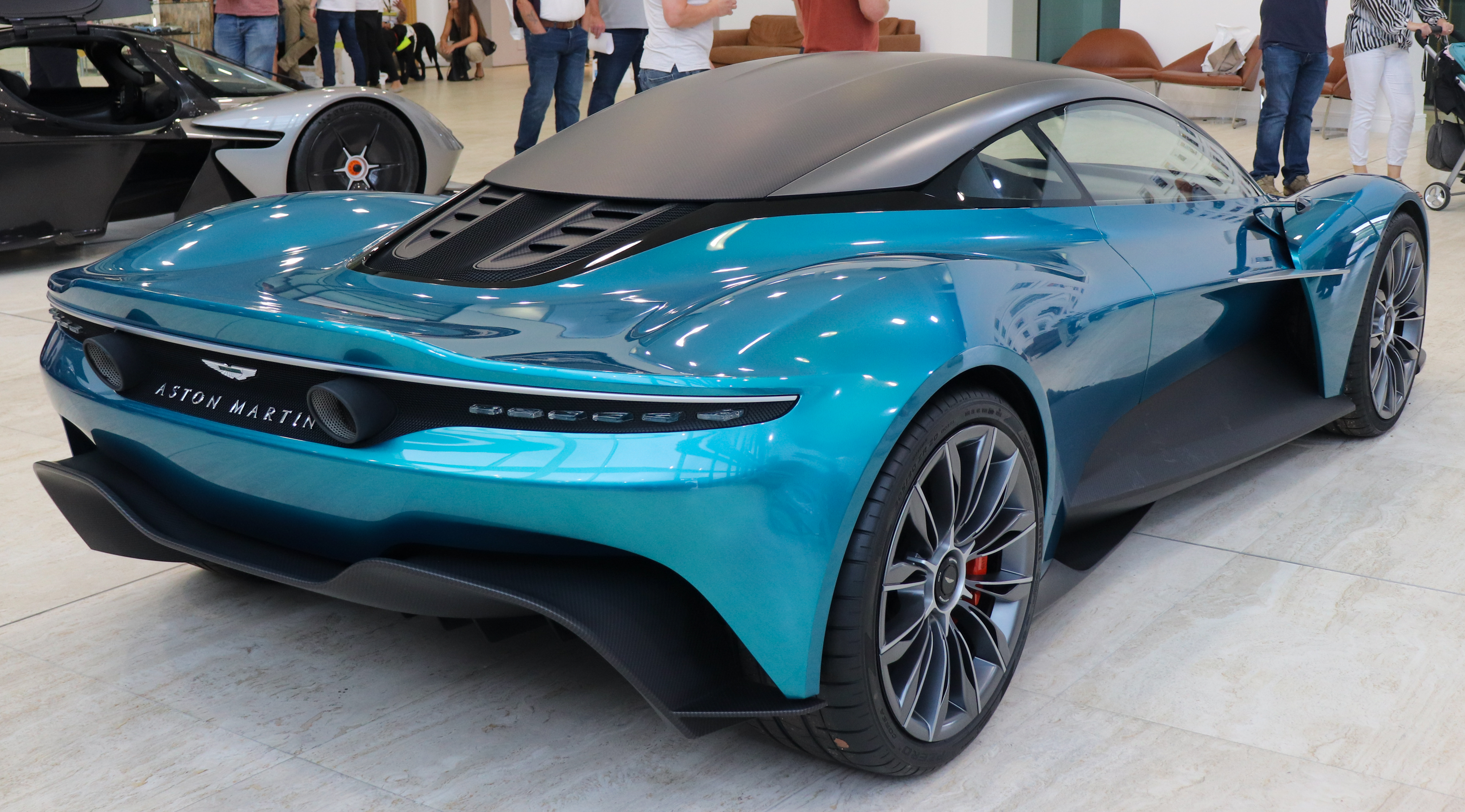

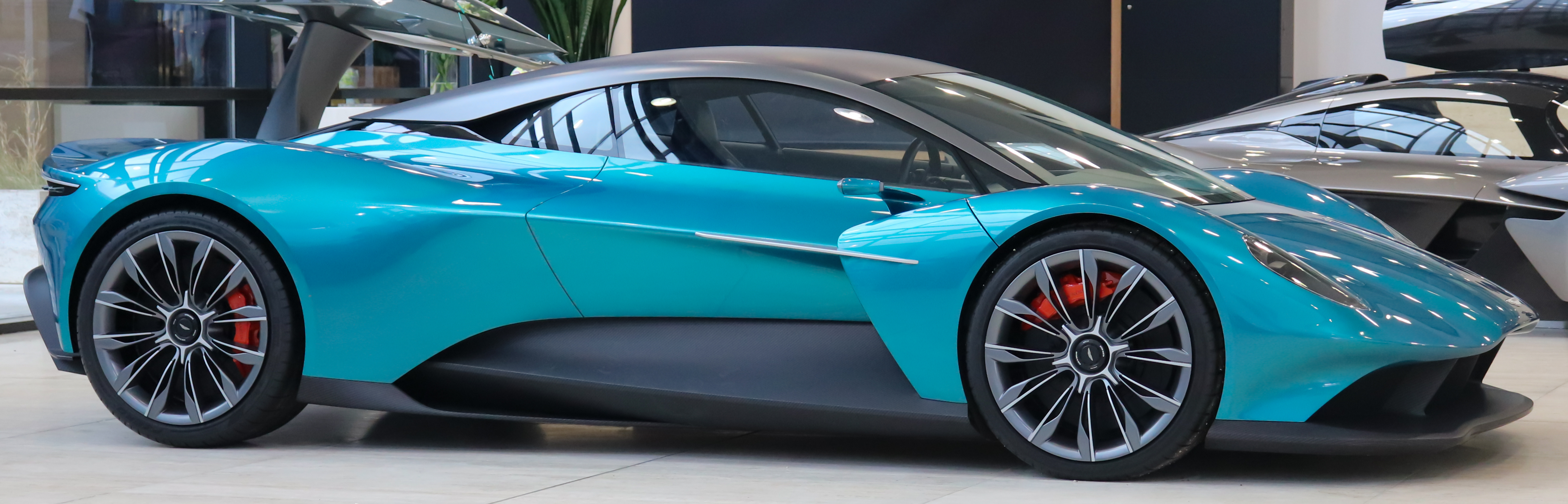
