= Aston Martin Valen =

Overview
- Manufacturer: Aston Martin
- Production: 2026; 150 units
- Assembly: United Kingdom: Gaydon, Warwickshire

Body and chassis
- Class: Grand tourer (S)
- Body style: 2-door coupé
- Layout: Front mid-engine, rear-wheel-drive
- Doors: Swan
- Related: Aston Martin Vanquish (2024)

Powertrain
- Engine: 5.2 L AE31 twin-turbo V12

Dimensions
- Wheelbase: 2,885 mm (114 in)
- Length: 4,830 mm (190 in)
- Width: 2,044 mm (80 in)
- Height: 1,290 mm (51 in)
- Kerb weight: 1,664 kg (3,668 lb)

The Aston Martin Valen is a grand tourer produced by Aston Martin. It is positioned as Aston Martin's most powerful front-engined car and limited to 150 units. It was officially unveiled on 14 August 2026.

== Overview ==
The Valen features a more brutal and angular design compared to other Aston Martin models, including a larger front grille, prominent front splitter and a solid rear tailgate that replaces the usual rear window and boot lid.

The interior is highly customisable, featuring 3D-printed elements, various choices of carbon fibre materials, and multiple seat types. Its boot capacity is 170 L (6.0 cu ft).

The Valen is equipped with a 5.2-liter twin-turbo V12 engine based on that of the third-generation Vanquish, tuned to produce a total power output of 838 hp (625 kW) and 738 lb⋅ft (1,001 N⋅m) of torque. It can accelerate from 0 to 60 mph (97 km/h) in 3.0 seconds and reach a top speed of 214 mph (344 km/h).

Compared to the Vanquish, the Valen is up to 110 kg (240 lb) lighter. This is due to the standard magnesium wheels and an optional lightweight pack which contributes 17 kg (37 lb) of the reduced weight through machined aluminium suspension arms, knuckles and titanium chassis bolts.

From the reworked quad-exhaust setup, which includes two perpetually open upper exhausts and two valved lower exhausts. According to Aston Martin, this exhaust features reduced frequencies, higher tones, and is "50 percent louder than the Vanquish across the entire rev range".

Rear View

Interior
