= Stork (disambiguation) =

The stork is a long-legged wading bird.

Stork or Storks can refer to:

== Arts and entertainment ==
- stOrk, an experimental metal band
  - stOrk (album), the band's 2011 debut album
- Stork, a fictional character in the Storm Hawks series
- Stork (film), a 1971 Australian comedy
- Storks (film), a 2016 animated film
- Storks (painting), a painting by Józef Chełmoński

== Business ==
- Stork B.V., a Dutch company in the aerospace and energy industries
- The Stork, a pub in Lancashire, England
- Stork (margarine), a brand of margarine
- STORK, callsign of Russian airline Auo Airclub AIST-M - see List of airline codes

== People ==
- Stork (surname), a list of people
- Henry Knight Storks (1811–1874), British Army lieutenant-general and colonial governor
- Stork (pharaoh), Egyptian pharaoh from the pre-dynastic period who may not have existed
- Song Byung-gu, alias "Stork", Korean professional Starcraft player
- Francis Ford (cricketer) (1866–1940), English cricketer nicknamed "Stork"
- Ted Hendricks (born 1947), American retired National Football League player nicknamed "the Stork"
- Hunter Hendry (1895–1988), Australian cricketer nicknamed "Stork"
- Wolf "the Stork" Popper, founder of the Wolf Popper Synagogue in 1620

== Sports ==
- Storks (sports club), a baseball and softball team based in The Hague, Netherlands
- Kobe Storks, originally named the Hyogo Storks, a professional basketball team based in Kobe, Japan
- Nishinomiya Storks, a Japanese National Basketball League team

== Other uses ==
- HMS Stork, various Royal Navy ships
- 01.002 Fighter Squadron "Storks", a French Air Force fighter squadron
- Stork Ridge, Graham Land, Antarctica
- STORK, a platform which allows people to use their Digital national id to establish new e-relations with foreign electronic services
- Scavenger's daughter, a little-used torture device invented during the reign of King Henry VIII of England, also known as the Stork
- Stork (HBC vessel), operated by the Hudson's Bay Company from 1904–1908 - see Hudson's Bay Company vessels
- STORK II, a planned bi-directional Czech-Polish gas pipeline project

== See also ==
- Special Services Group of Pakistan, also known as the "Black Storks"
- Storch (disambiguation), German for stork
- Storck (disambiguation)
