= Storck (disambiguation) =

Storck is a German confectionery company

It may also refer to:

- Storck Barracks, a US Army facility in Germany
- Storck, Virginia, an unincorporated community

== People ==
- Abraham Storck (1644-1708), Dutch painter
- Adele Storck (1874-1960), German-born American lawyer
- Anton von Störck (1731-1803), Austrian physician
- Bernd Storck (born 1963), German head coach of the Hungary national football team and former football player
- Carl Storck (1892-1950), co-founder of the National Football League and a founding team owner
- Carol Storck (1854-1926), Romanian sculptor
- Cecilia Cuțescu-Storck (1879-1969), Romanian painter
- Erik Storck, American sailor in the 2012 Olympics
- Frederic Storck (1872-1942), Romanian sculptor
- Georg Störck (1911-2011), German World War II Wehrmacht officer
- George H. Storck, American college football coach in the 1960s
- Gunther Storck (1938-1993), German Catholic bishop
- Henri Storck (1907–1999), Belgian author and filmmaker
- Hermann Baagøe Storck (1839-1922), Danish architect
- Jacobus Storck (1641-c. 1700), Dutch painter
- Karl Storck (1826-1887), Romanian sculptor and art theorist
- Klaus Storck (1928–2011), German cellist, music editor and academic teacher
- Markus Storck (born 1964) German bicycle designer and developer
- Shelby Storck (1916-1969), American newscaster, actor, writer, journalist, public relations specialist and film and television producer and director

== See also ==
- Storch (disambiguation)
- Stork (disambiguation)
