= Storch =

Storch is a German surname meaning "Stork". Notable people with the surname include:

- Ambrosius Pelargus (c. 1493 – 1561), German Dominican theologian (real last name Storch)
- Anne Storch (born 1968), German linguist
- Anton Storch (1892–1975), German politician
- Arthur Storch (1925–2013), American actor and Broadway director
- Beatrix von Storch (born 1971), German politician
- Despina Storch (1894/95–1918), Turkish woman alleged to have been a spy for Germany and the Ottoman Empire
- Eduard Štorch (1878–1956), Czech writer and archaeologist
- Erikka Lynn Storch (born 1971), American politician from West Virginia
- Frederik Storch (1805–1883), Danish genre painter
- Gerald L. Storch, American retail executive
- Hans von Storch (born 1949), German climatologist
- Jannich Storch (born 1993), Danish footballer
- Karl Storch (1913–1992), German hammer thrower
- Klaus von Storch (born 1962), Chilean aerospace engineer and astronaut trainee
- Larry Storch (1923–2022), American actor and comedian
- Marcia Storch (1933–1998), American physician and feminist
- Marcus Storch (born 1942), Swedish industrialist and engineer
- Nikolaus Storch (died after 1536), reformation preacher
- Scott Storch (born 1973), American record producer
- Sven von Storch (born 1970), German businessman
- Uwe Storch (1940–2017), German mathematician
- Wenzel Storch (born 1961), German film director and producer
