= Storch (disambiguation) =

Storch is a surname.

Storch may also refer to:

- Fieseler Fi 156 Storch, a German light airplane used before, during and after World War II
  - Criquet Storch, a Colombian 75% scale replica of the German airplane
  - Slepcev Storch, a Serbian kit and ultralight aircraft, the latter a 75% scale replica of the German airplane
- Fly Synthesis Storch, an Italian ultralight aircraft
- RRG Storch V, a German light plane in a series of Storch gliders designed by Alexander Lippisch
- TORCH complex (also known as STORCH), a medical acronym for a set of infections that are passed from a pregnant woman to her fetus

== See also ==
- Stork (disambiguation)
- Storck (disambiguation)
