= Szeroka Street, Kraków =

Street in Kraków, Poland

Szeroka Street
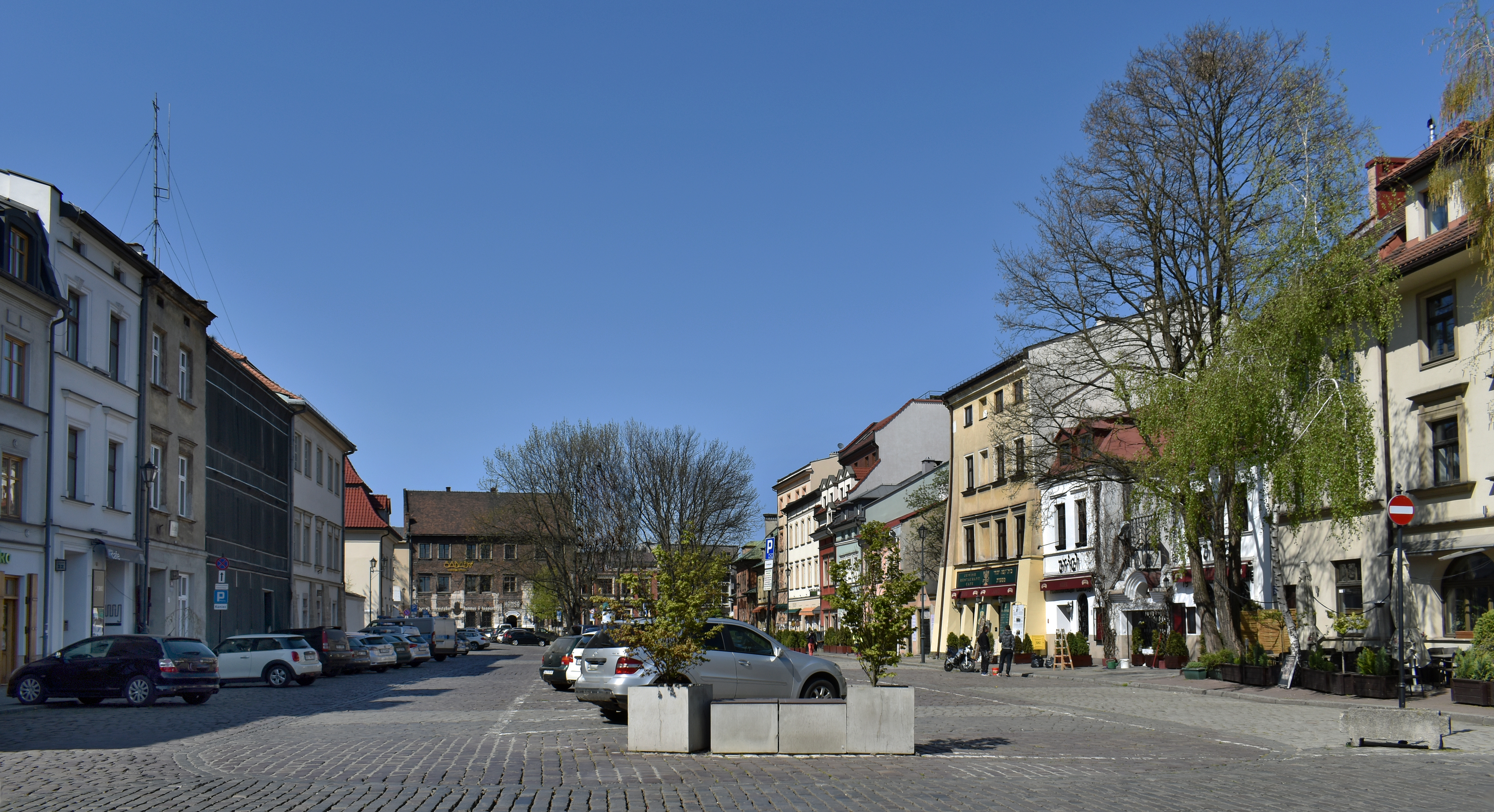
- The street seen from the south, from the Old Synagogue.
- Interactive map of Szeroka Street
- Part of: Kraków Old Town district
- Owner: City of Kraków
- Location: Kraków, Poland

UNESCO World Heritage Site
- Type: Cultural
- Criteria: iv
- Designated: 1978
- Part of: Historic Centre of Kraków
- Reference no.: 29
- Region: Europe and North America

Historic Monument of Poland
- Designated: 1994-09-08
- Part of: Kraków historical city complex
- Reference no.: M.P. 1994 nr 50 poz. 418

Szeroka Street (Polish: Ulica Szeroka, lit. Wide Street) - a historic street in Kazimierz, the former district of Kraków, Poland.

== History ==
In the Middle Ages, it served as the center of the village of Bawół, which was incorporated into the town of Kazimierz in 1340.

From the end of the 15th century, the Jewish population began to settle near the street. Over time, a separate district developed here, isolated from Kazimierz by its own city walls. Both religious and secular architecture concentrated around the street. In the 19th century, most of the wealthier residents moved to other districts of Kraków, and the area around Szeroka Street, like much of Kazimierz, became home to the Jewish poor.

In the northern part of the street, there is a small green square. This is likely the oldest Jewish cemetery in Kazimierz, existing before 1560. Before World War II, it was surrounded by a high wall and was used to bury Jewish suicides. Today, it is enclosed by a metal fence with elements shaped like seven-branched menorahs. The square features a memorial stone with a plaque dedicated to the 65,000 Polish citizens of Jewish origin from Kraków and its surroundings who were murdered by the Germans during World War II. Nearby, in front of the Remuh Synagogue, there is a memorial bench honoring Jan Karski.

In front of the Old Synagogue, there is a small monument commemorating 30 Poles who were executed by the Germans at this site on October 28, 1943.

During World War II, the synagogues were devastated, and the Jewish population was relocated to the Podgórze ghetto. After the war, the synagogues were rebuilt, with the exception of the Na Górce Synagogue, located at 22 Szeroka Street . The tenement house at 28 Szeroka Street housed the Gmilus Chasidim Debais Hakneses Synagogue.

The house at 27 Szeroka Street was home to the painter and graphic artist Jerzy Panek, who lived and worked there from 1962 to 2001. A commemorative plaque marks this fact. The tenement house at Szeroka Street 14 is the birthplace of Helena Rubinstein.

Every year, the final concert of the Jeawish Culture Festival in Kraków takes place on Szeroka Street.

== Buildings ==
- 2 Szeroka Street – Landau (Jordan) Tenement House, originally three separate tenement houses, all dating back to the 16th century.
- 6 Szeroka Street – The Great Mikveh, now the Klezmer-Hois Hotel.
- 16 Szeroka Street – Wolf Popper Synagogue.
- 24 Szeroka Street – Old Synagogue.
- 40 Szeroka Street – Remah Synagogue and Remah Cemetery.
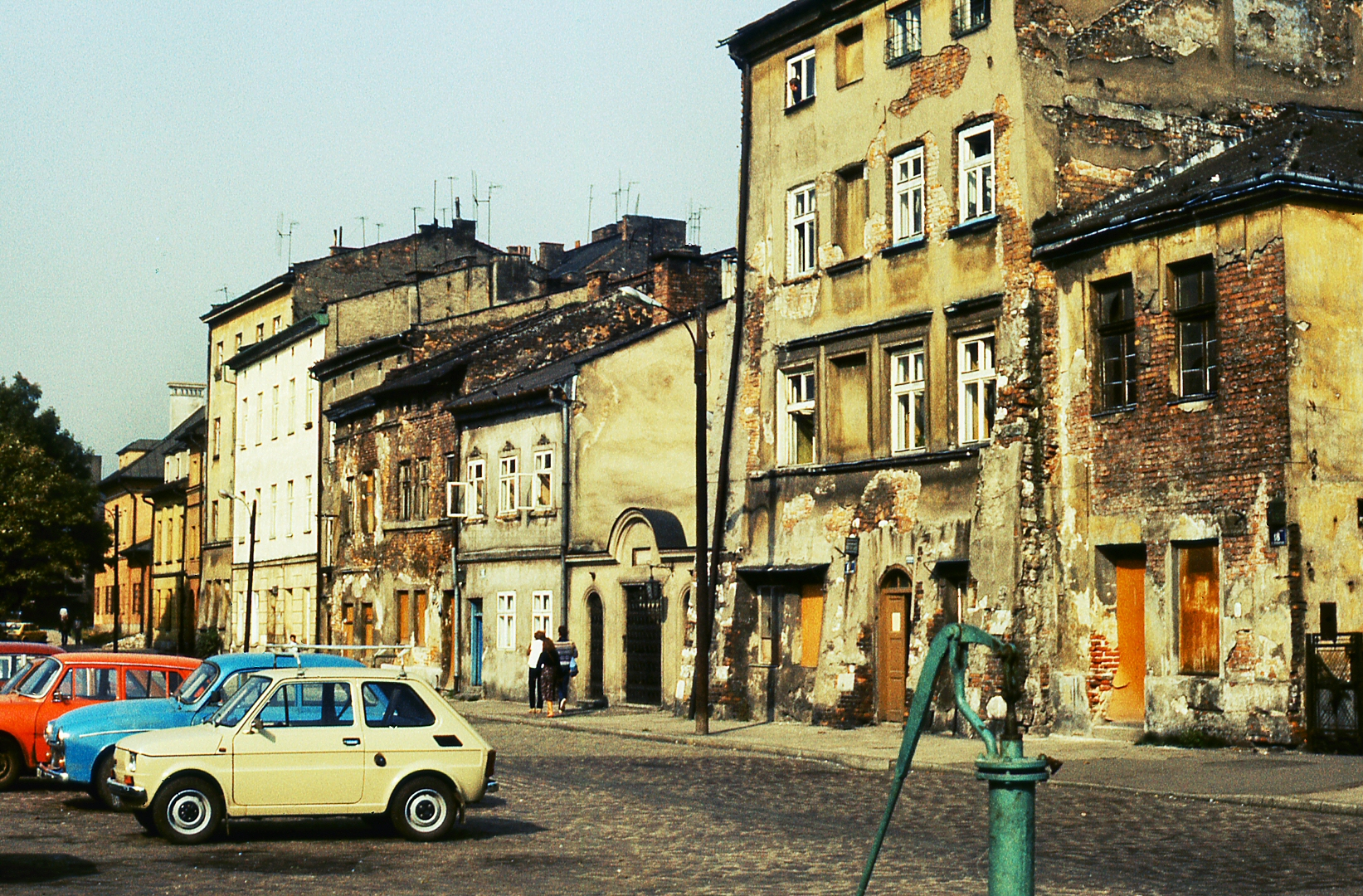
The eastern side of the street. Year 1983.

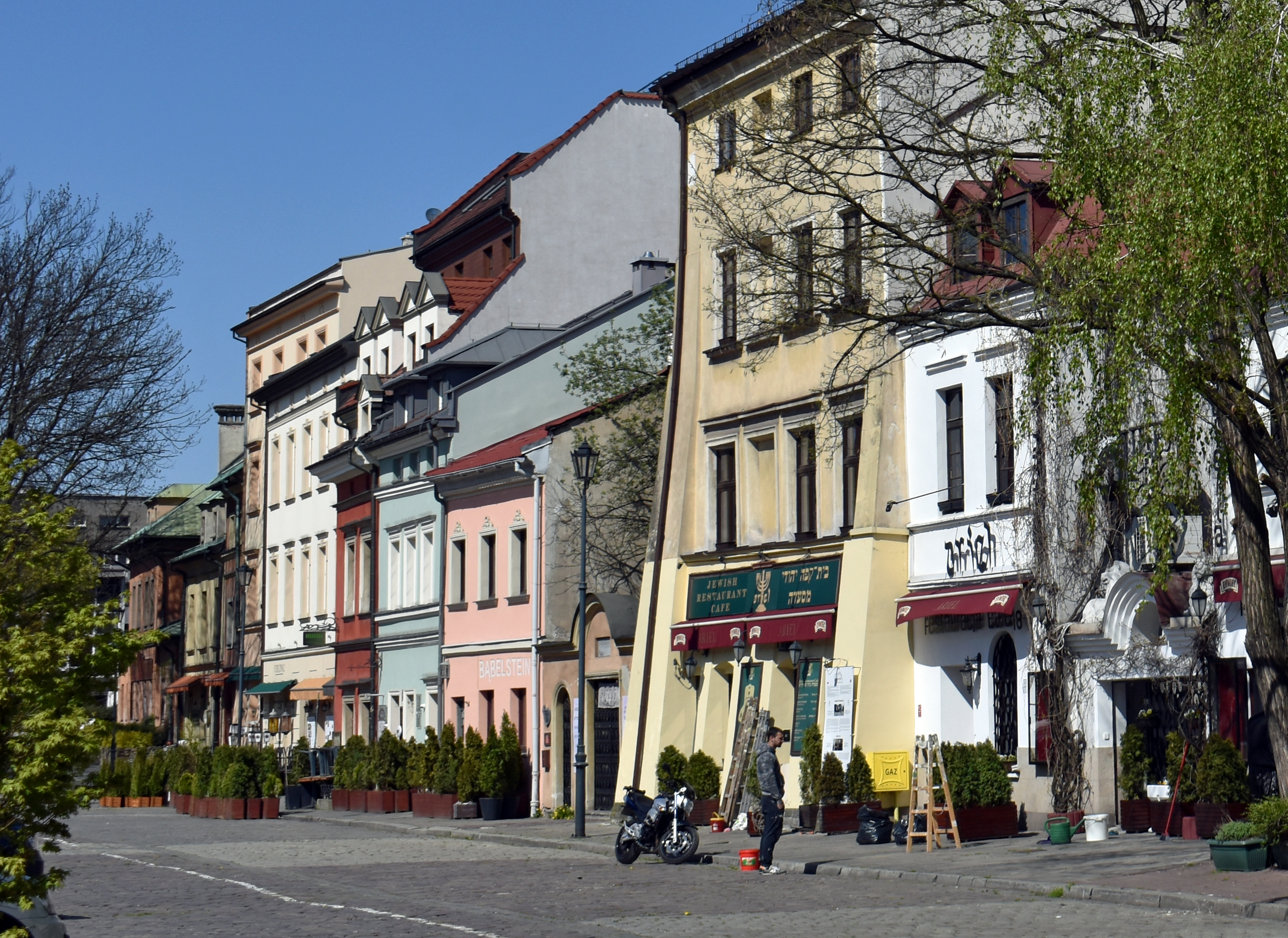
The eastern side of the street. Year 2020.

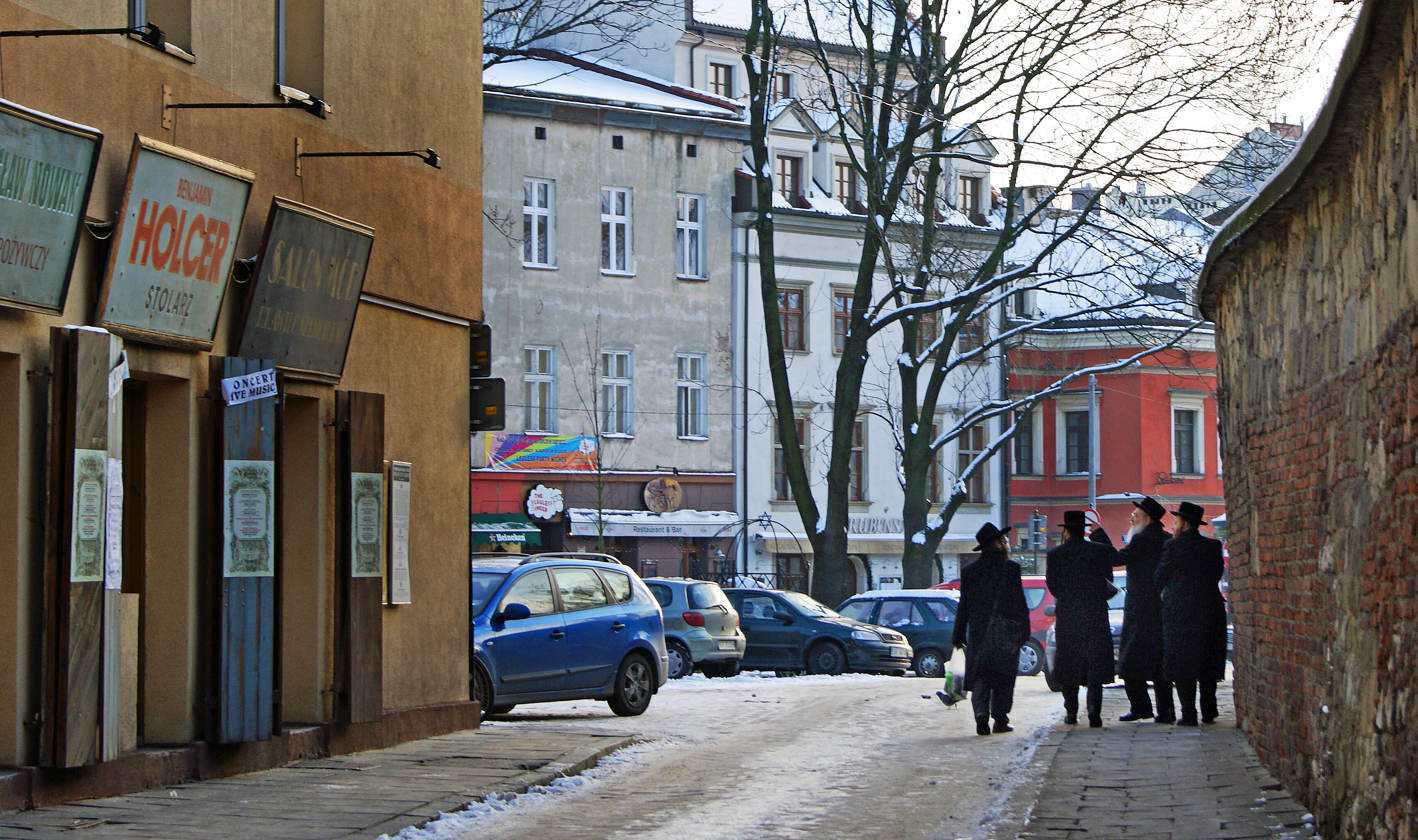
Haredi Jews in the Szeroka Street

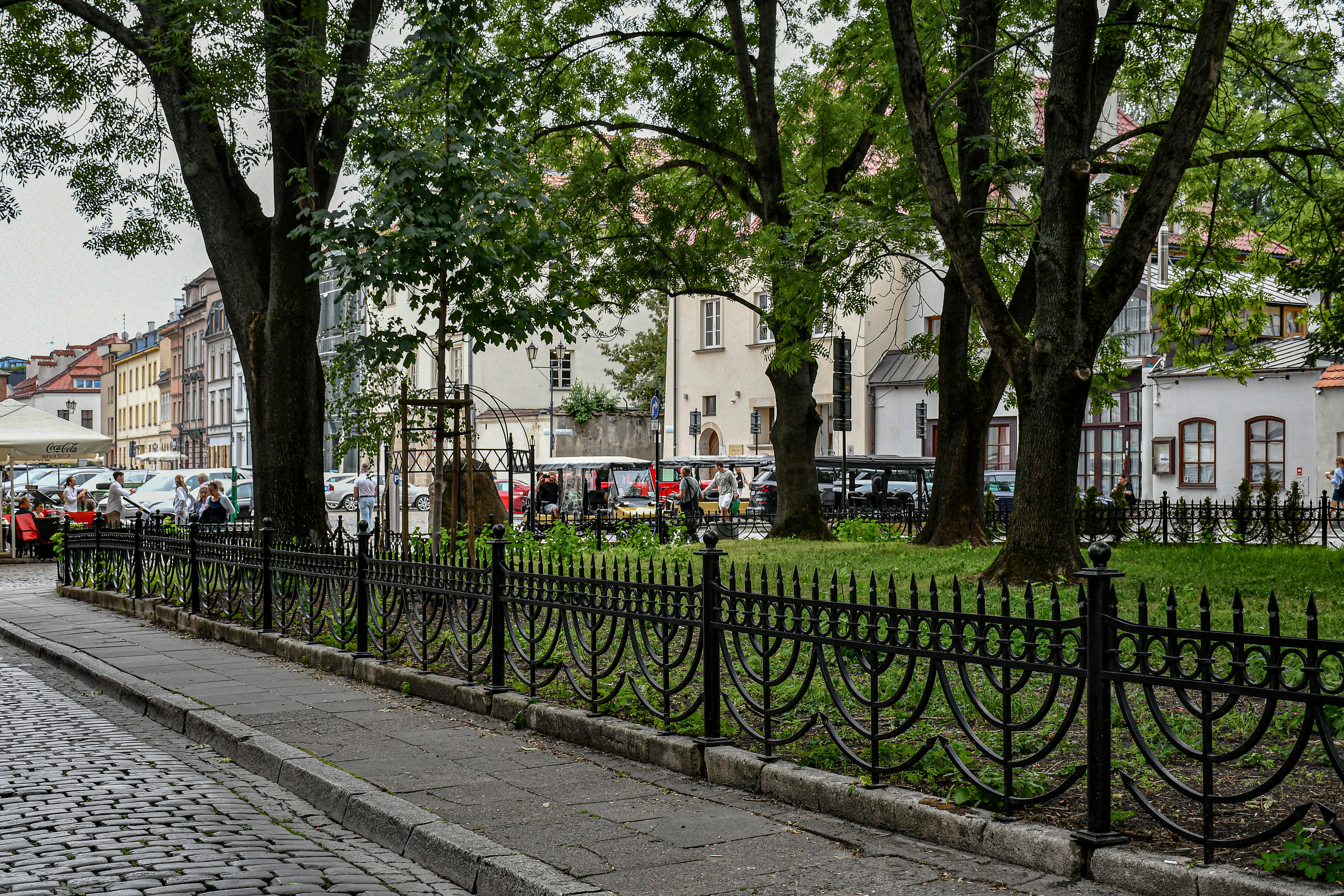
Probably the oldest Jewish cemetery existing before 1560
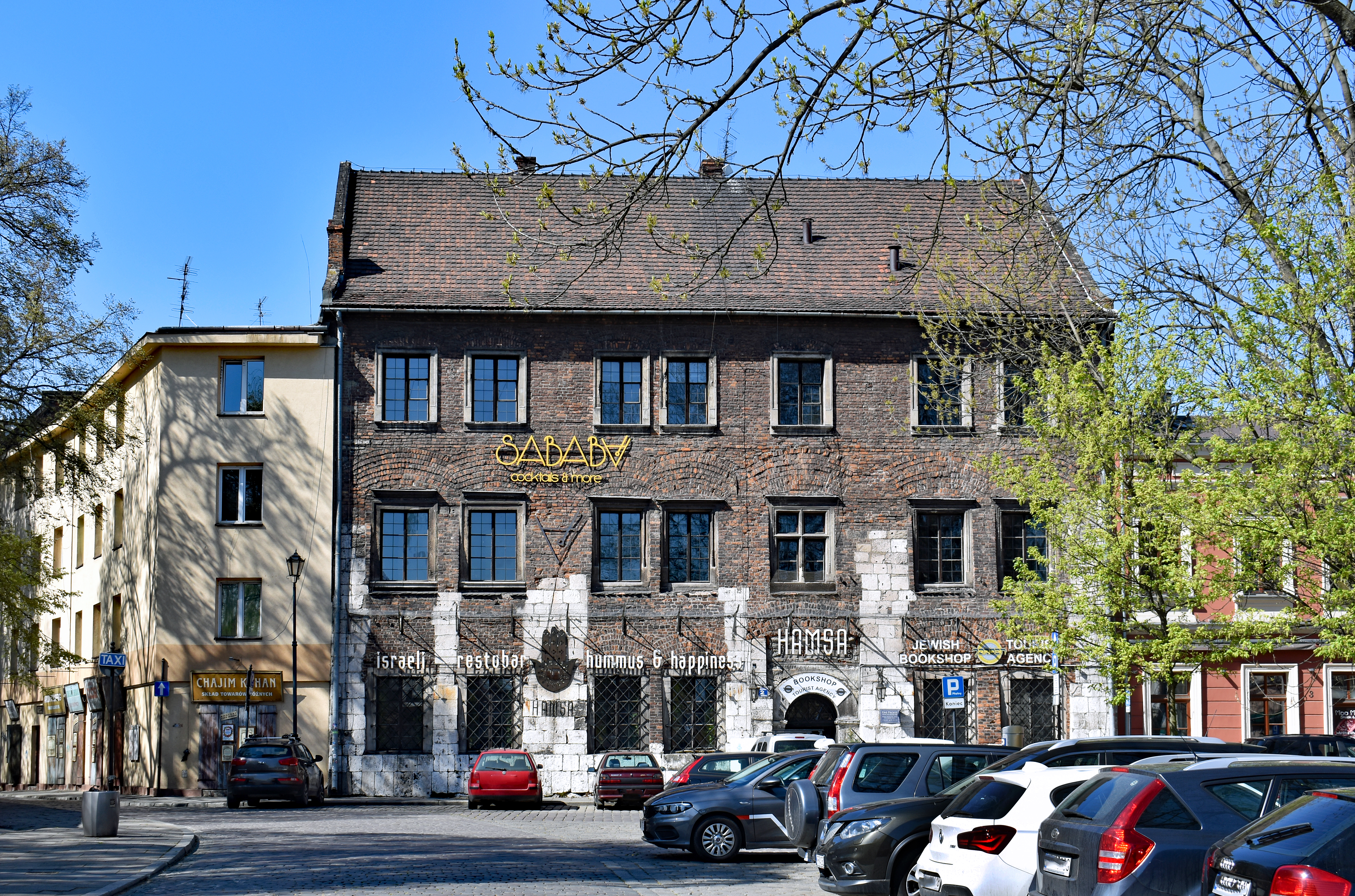
2 Szeroka Street (41 Miodowa Street)
"Jordans" house

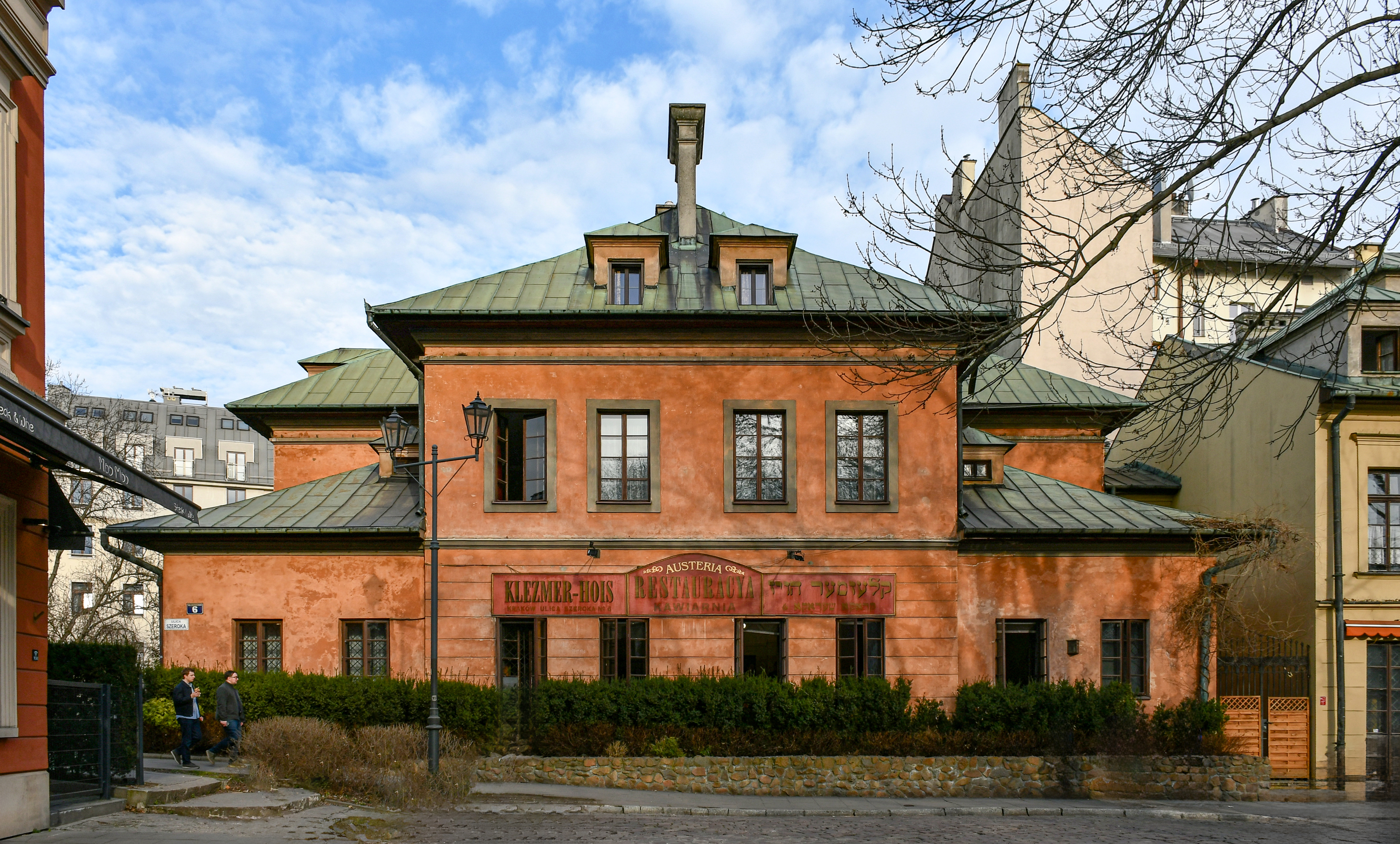
6 Szeroka Street
Former Great Mikveh

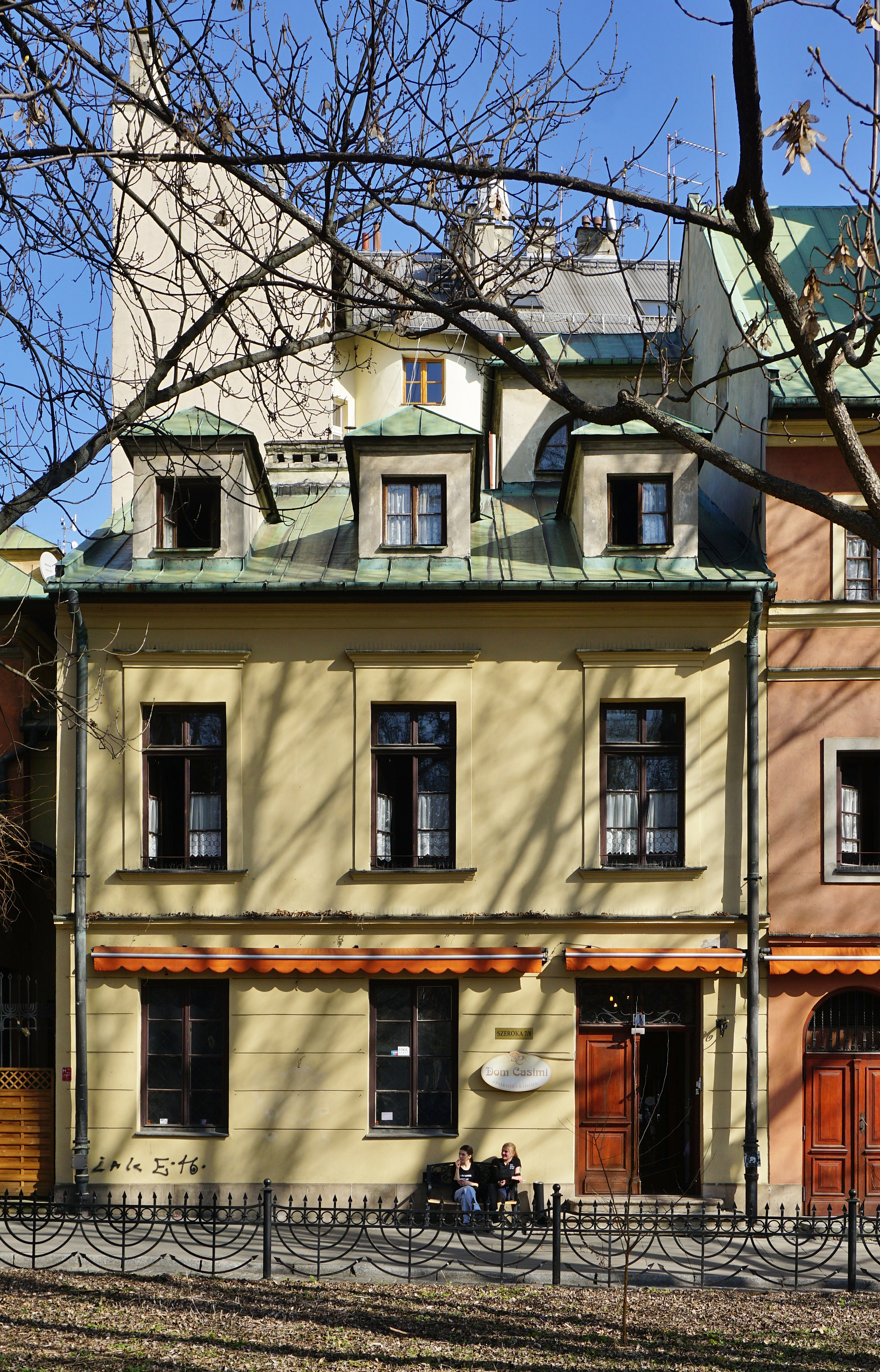
7 Szeroka Street
Tenement house

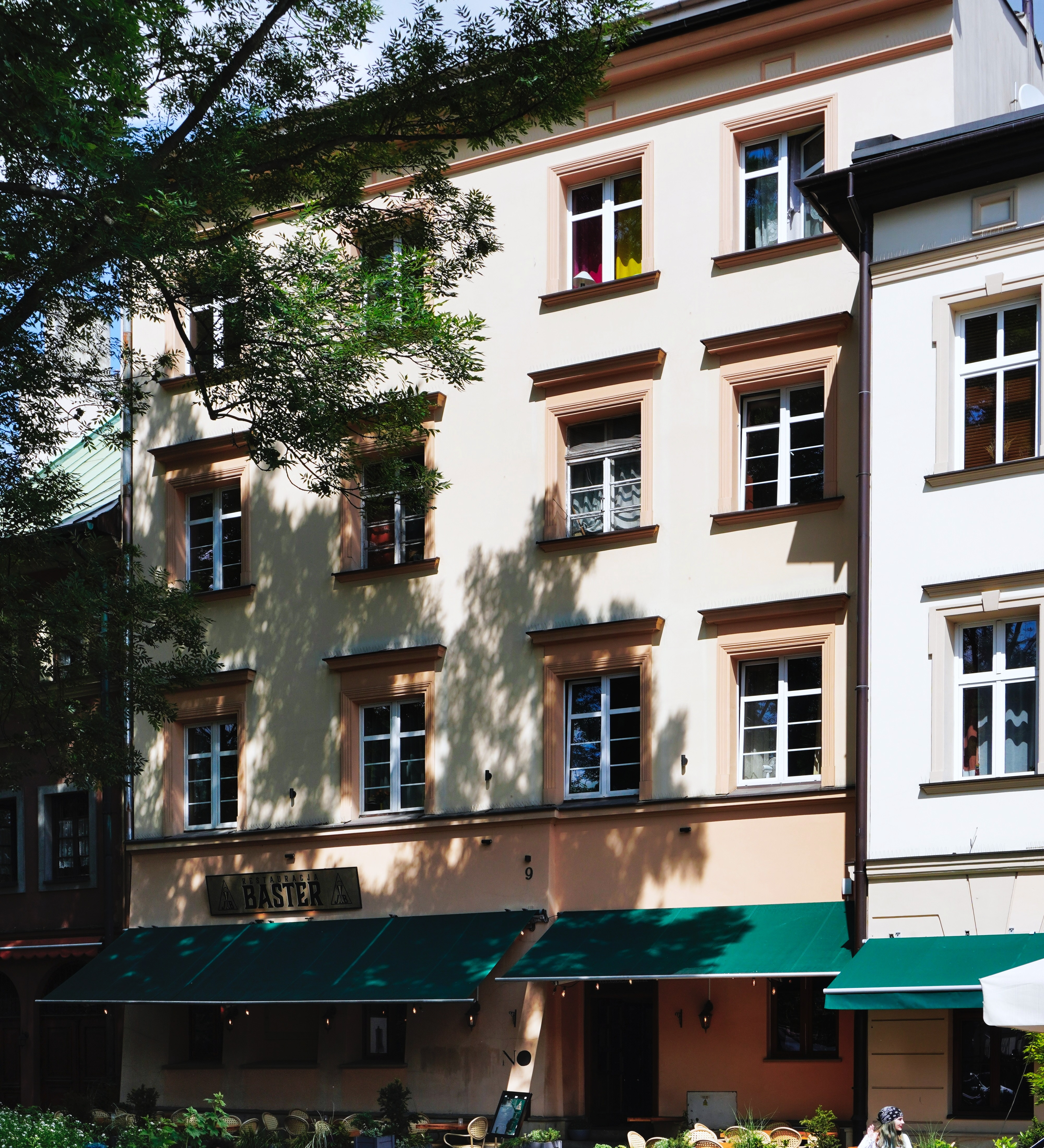
9 Szeroka Street
Tenement house

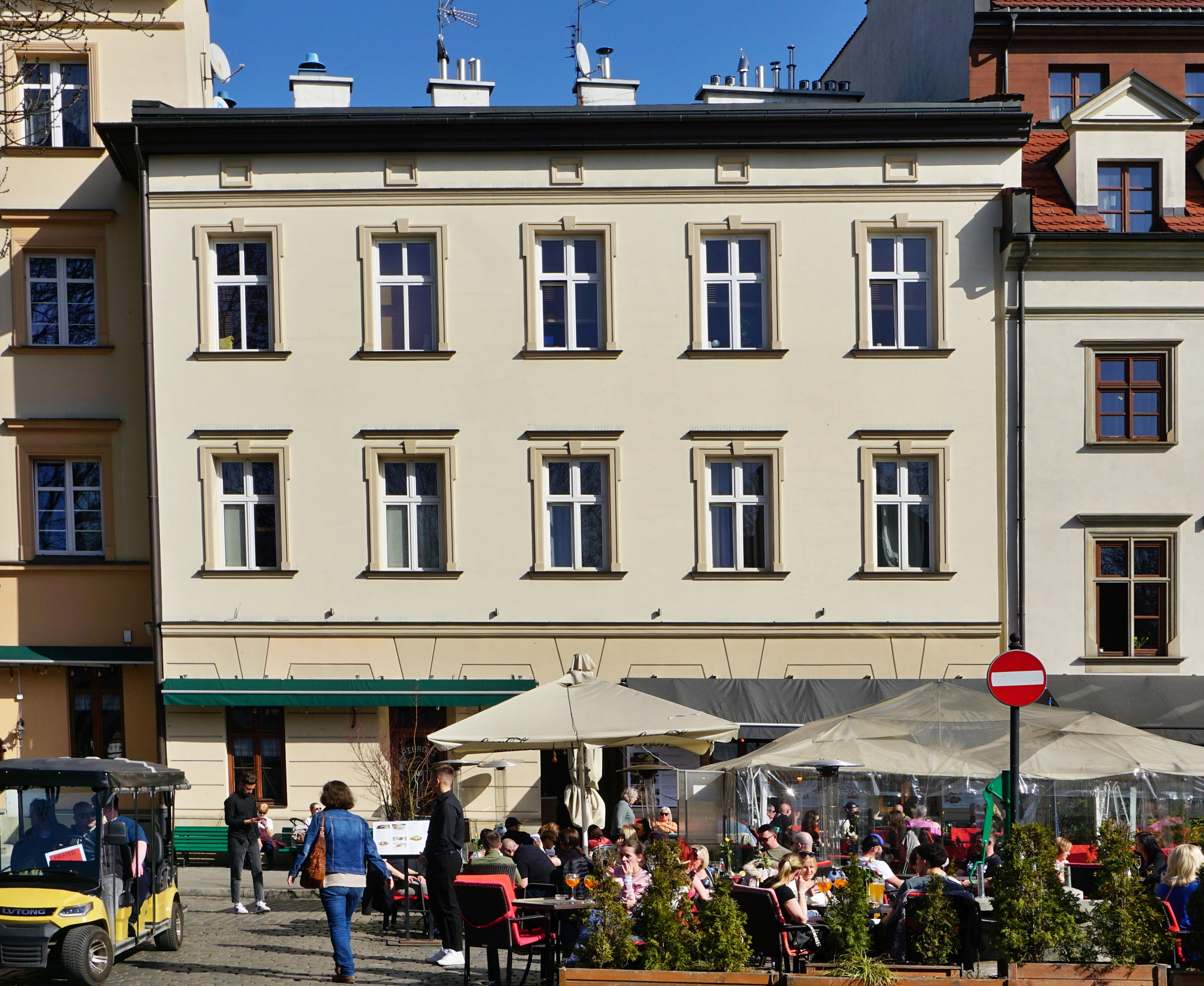
10 Szeroka Street
Tenement house

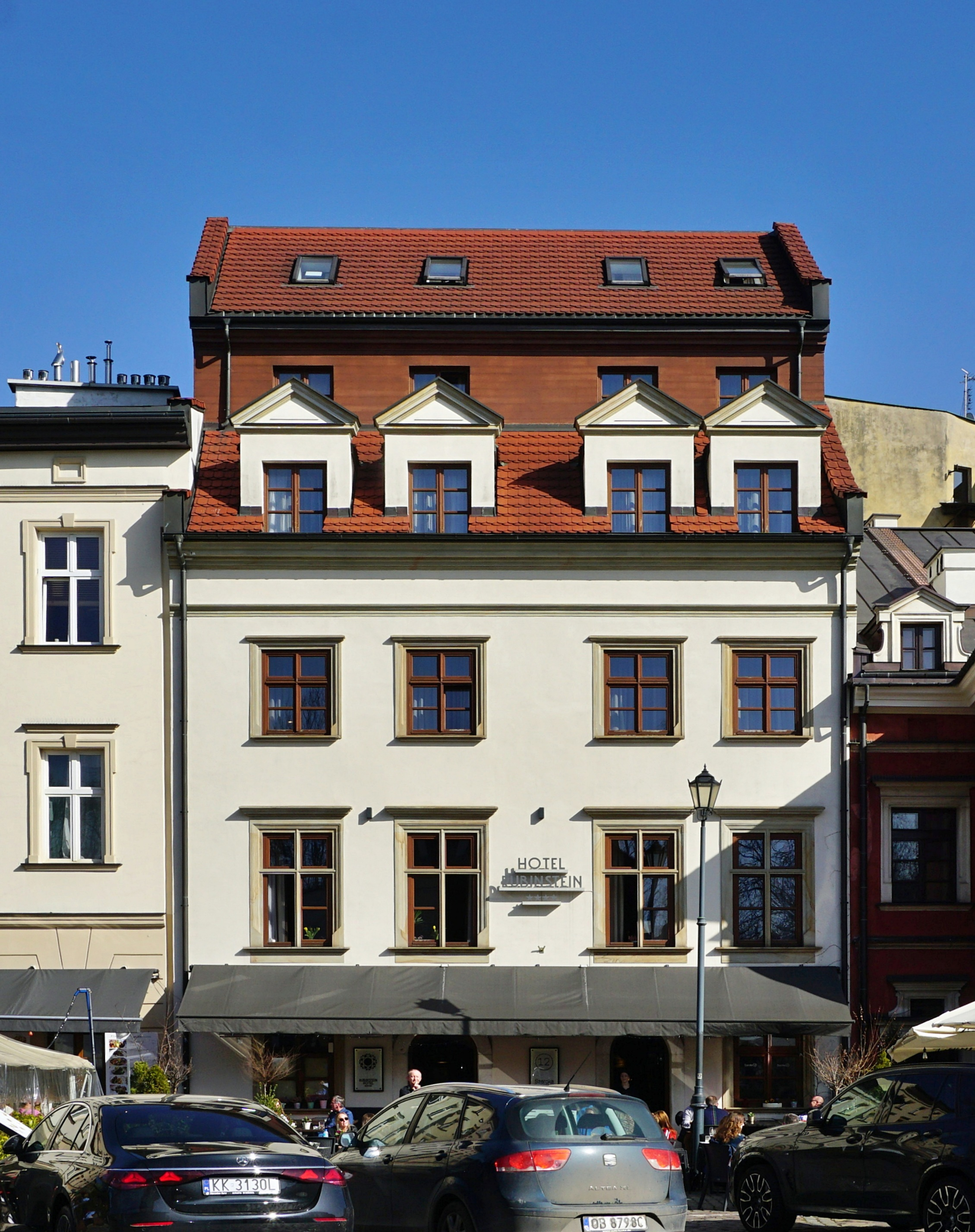
12 Szeroka Street
Tenement house

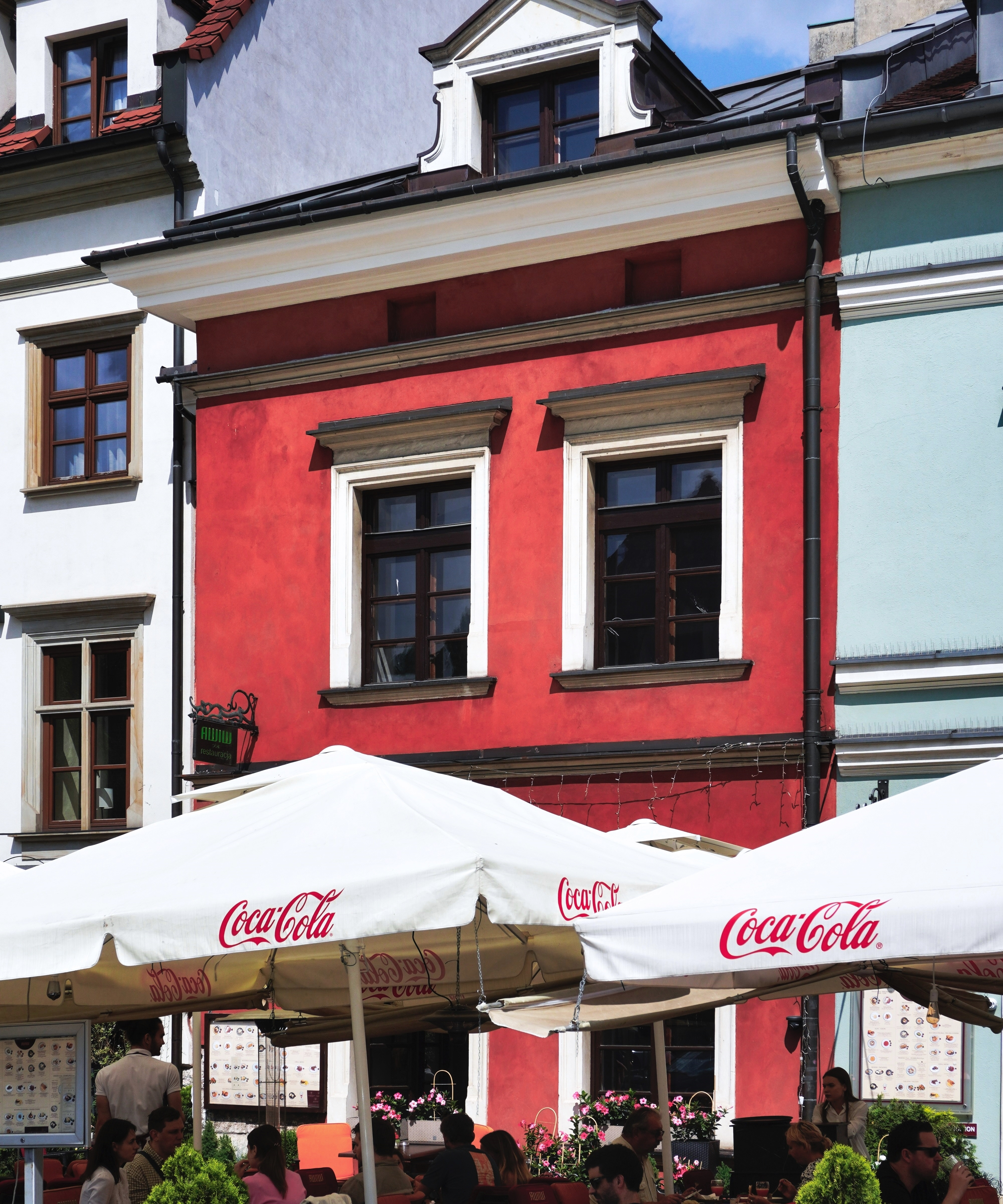
13 Szeroka Street
Tenement house

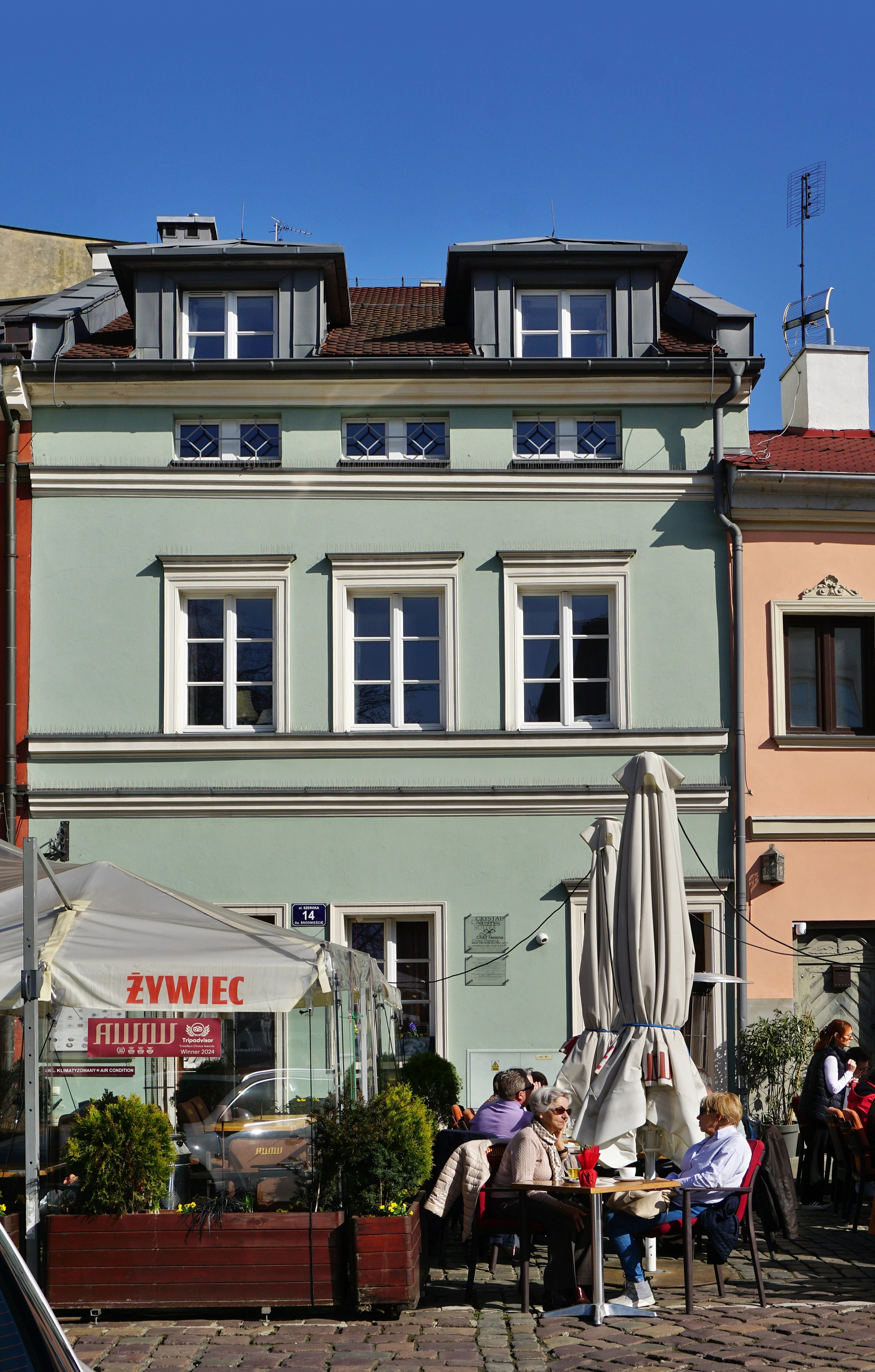
14 Szeroka Street
Tenement house (1899)

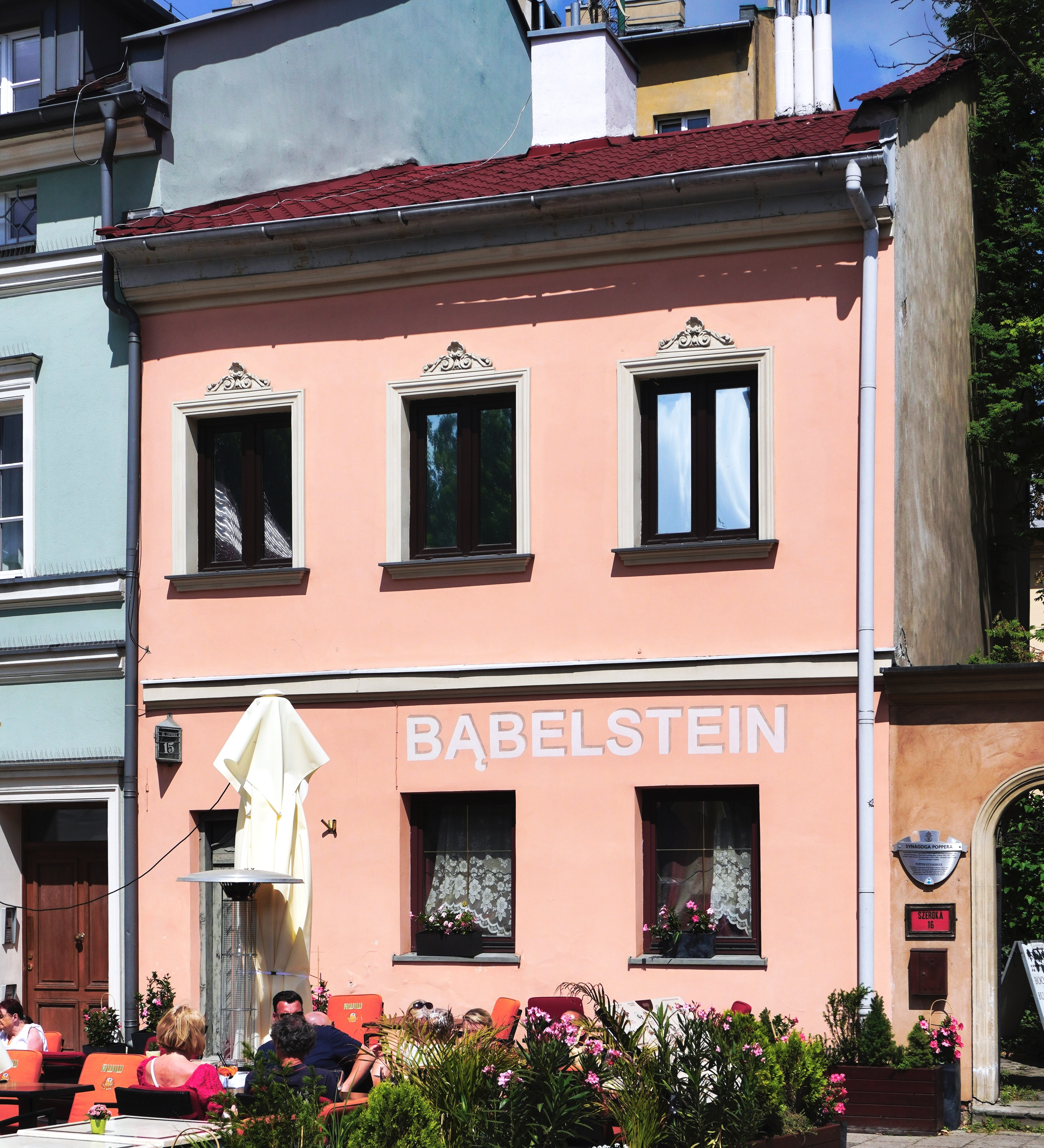
15 Szeroka Street
Tenement house (1842)

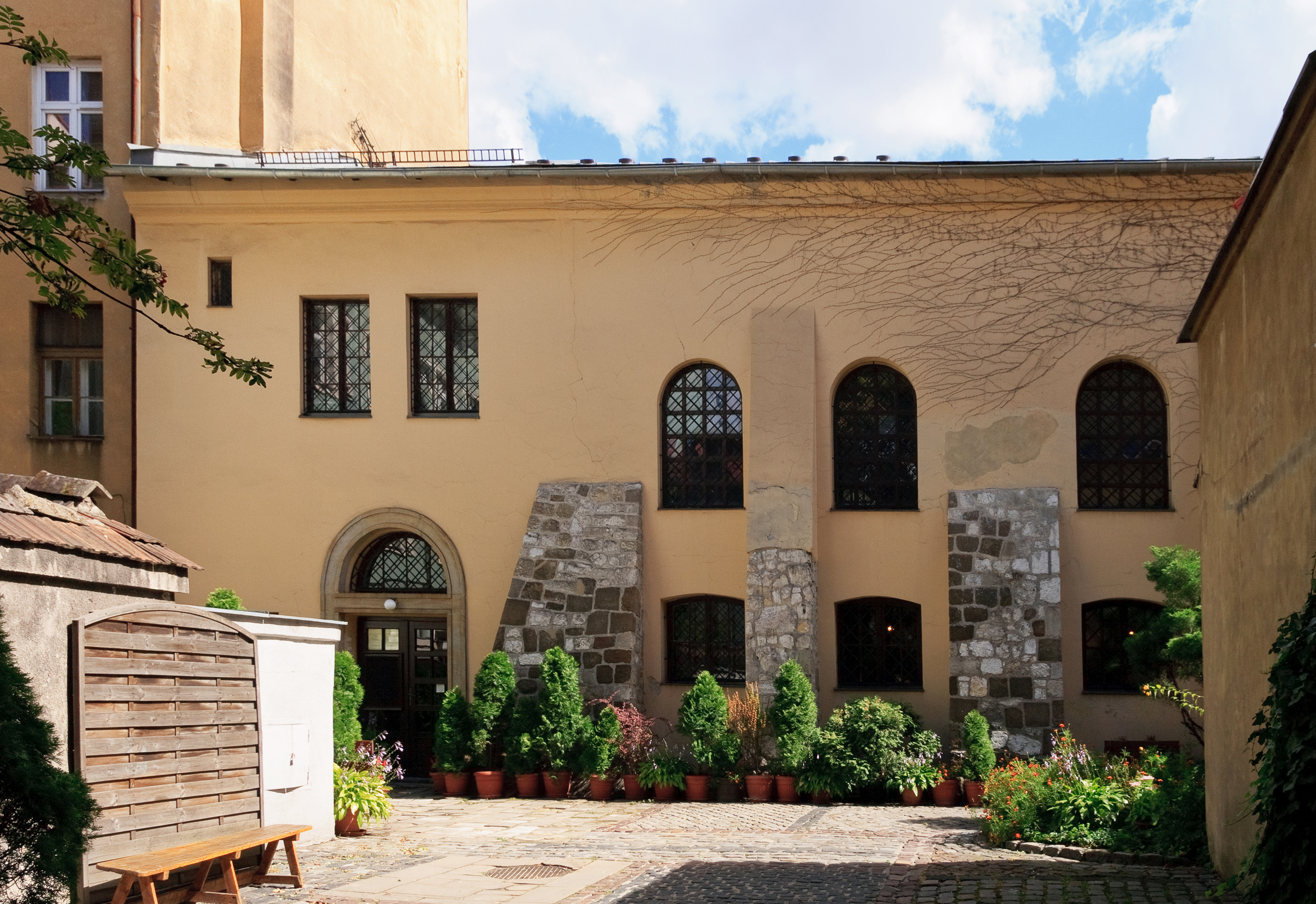
16 Szeroka Street
Wolf Popper Synagogue

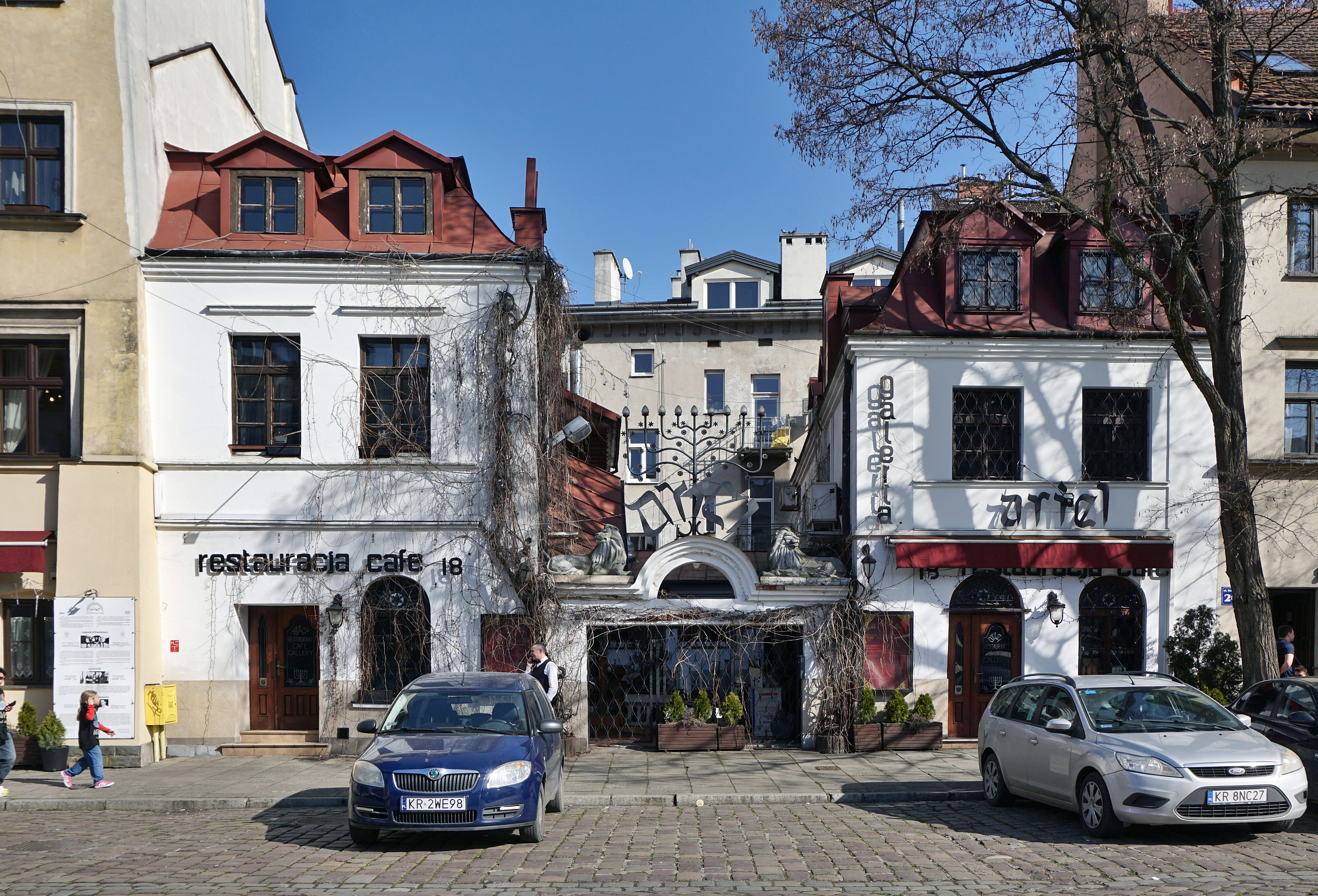
18 Szeroka Street
Tenement house (1927, design. Zygmunt Prokesz)

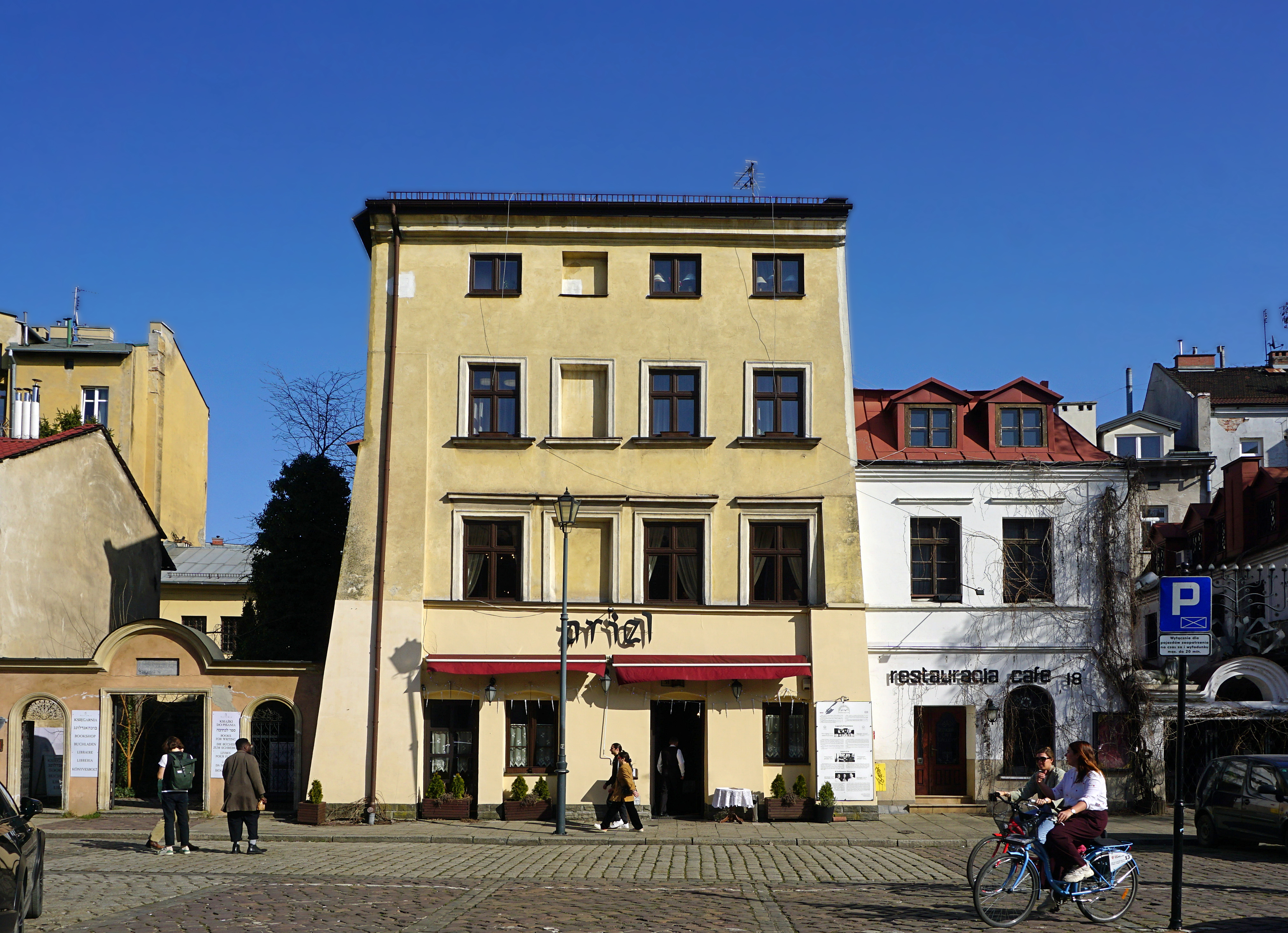
20 Szeroka Street
Tenement house (1895)

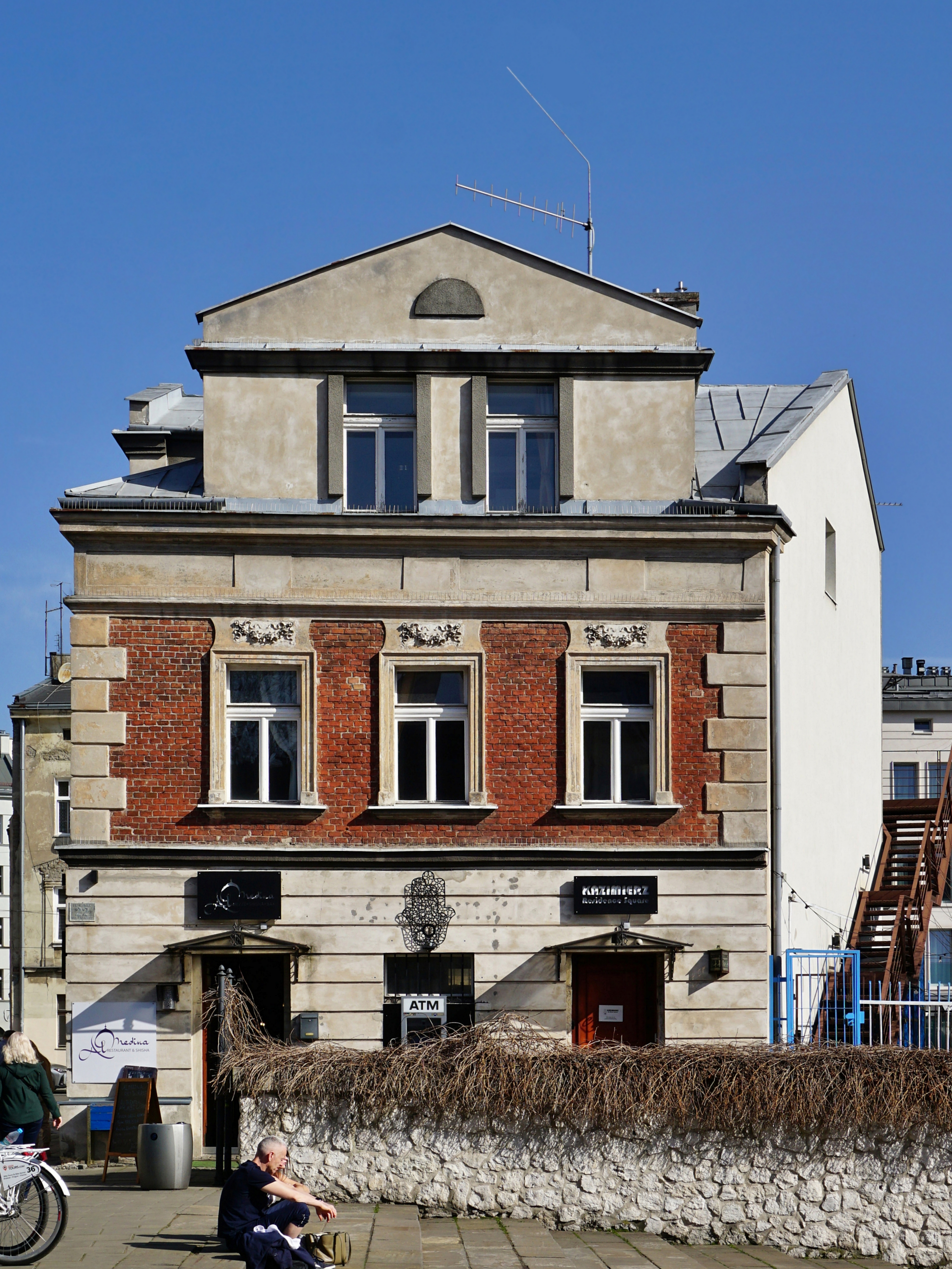
21 Szeroka Street
Tenement house

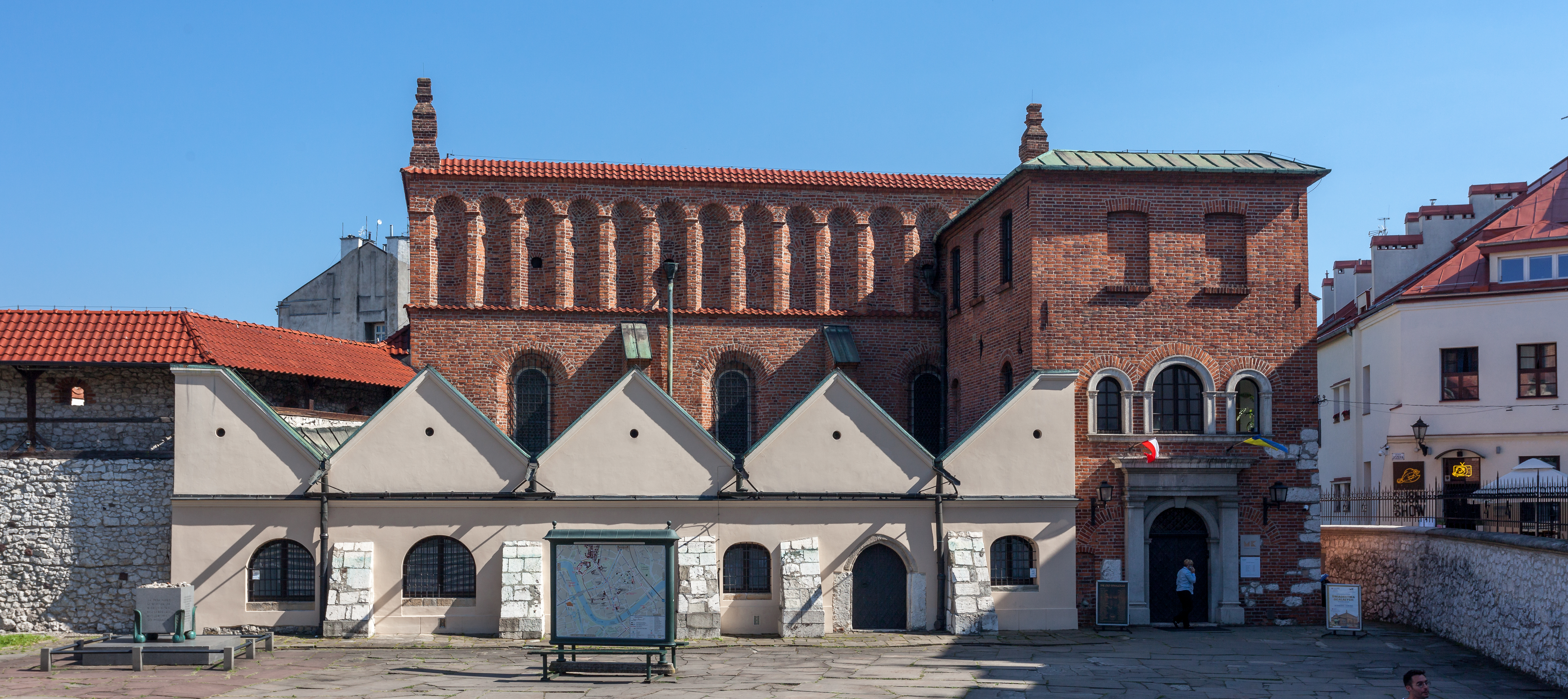
24 Szeroka Street
Old Synagogue

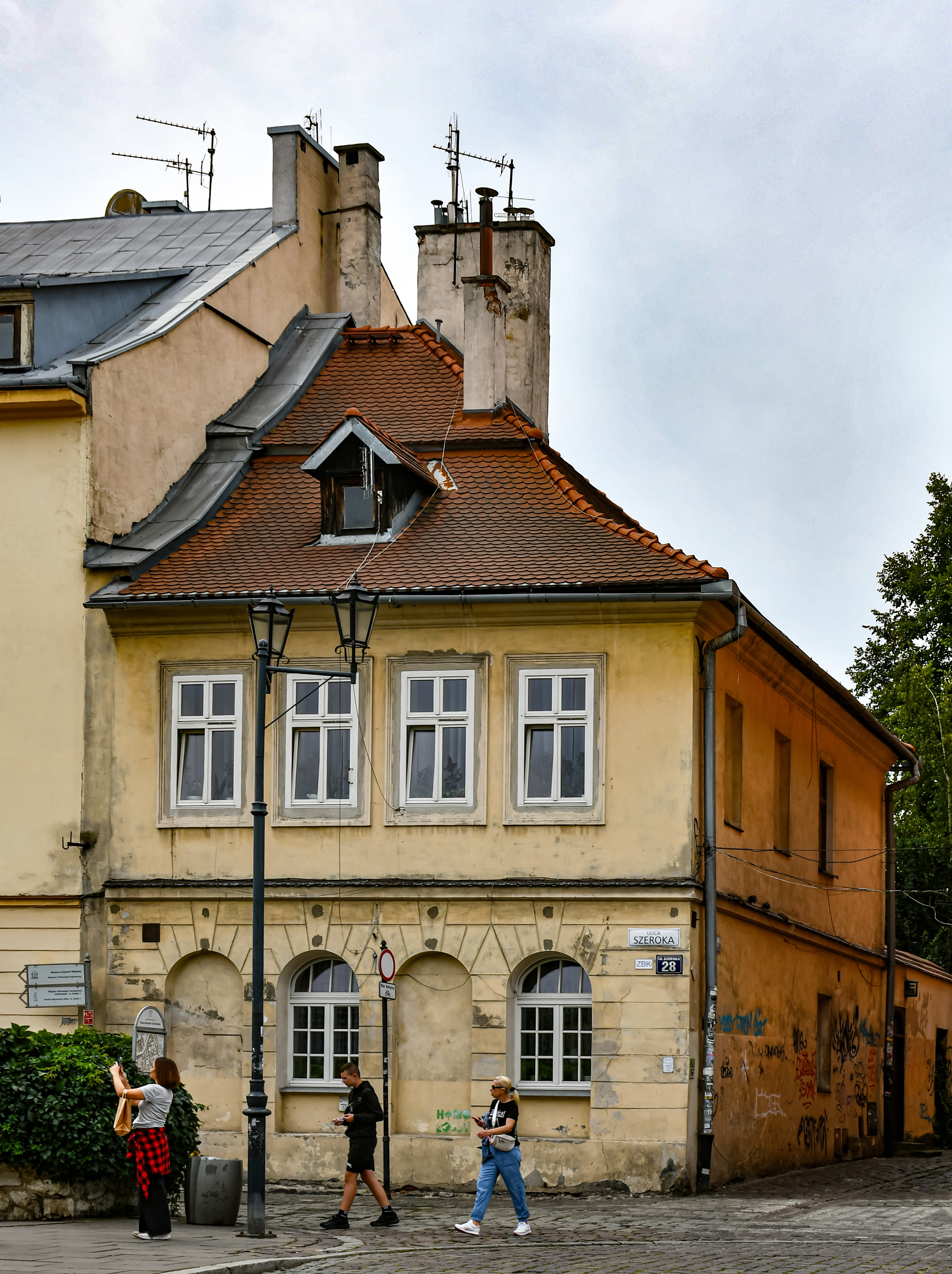
28 Szeroka Street
Gmilus Chasidim Debais Hakneses Prayerhouse

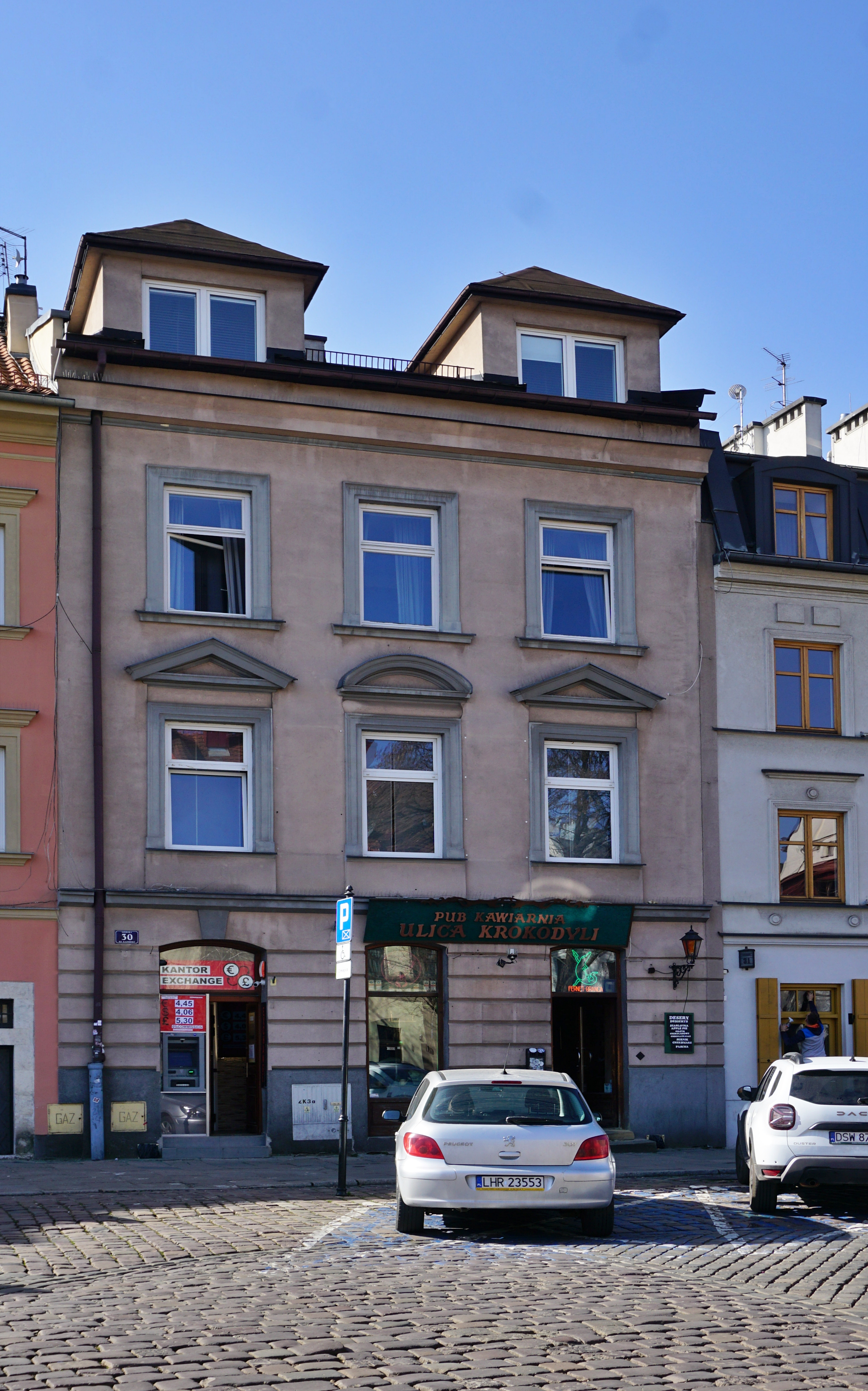
30 Szeroka Street
Tenement house

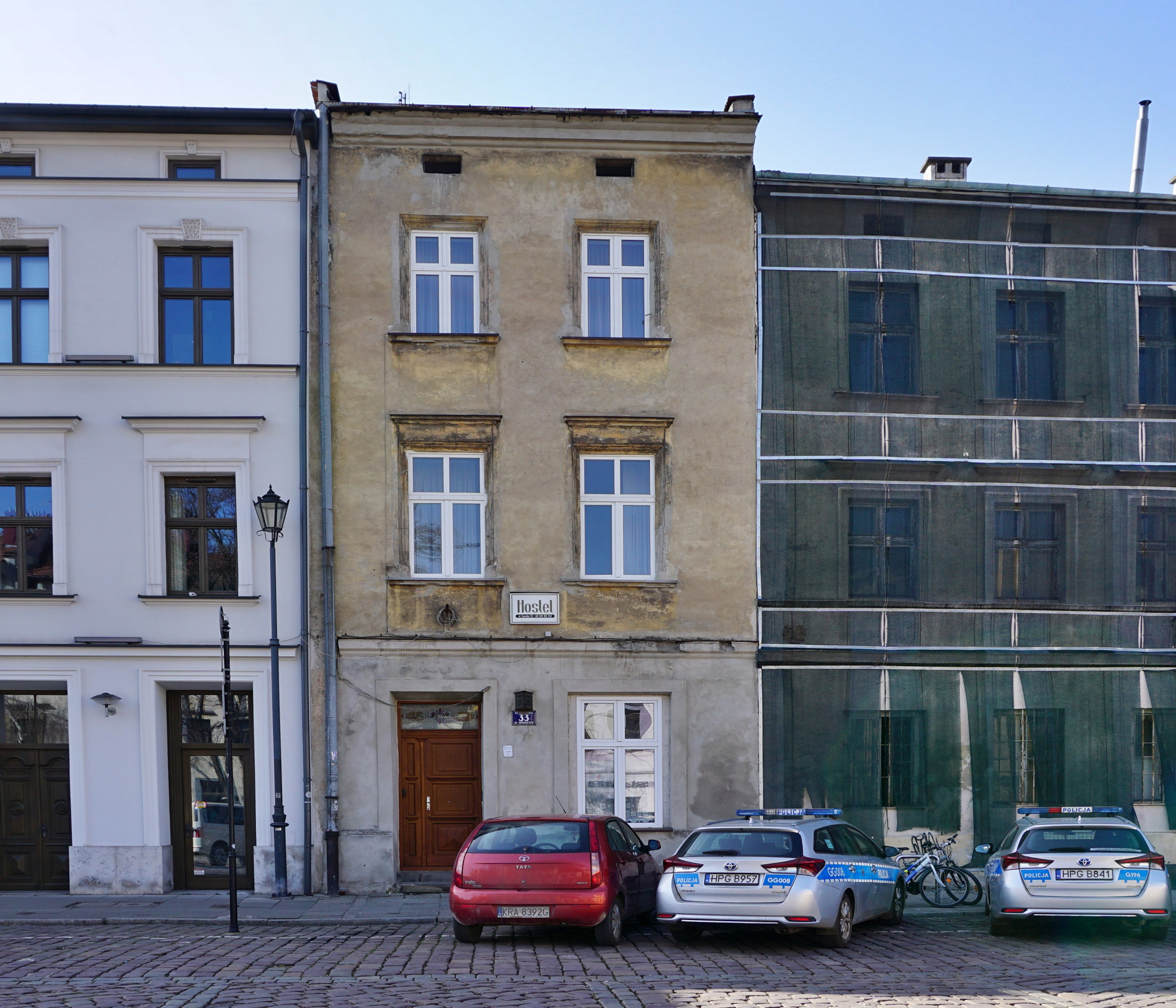
33 Szeroka Street
Tenement house (1773)

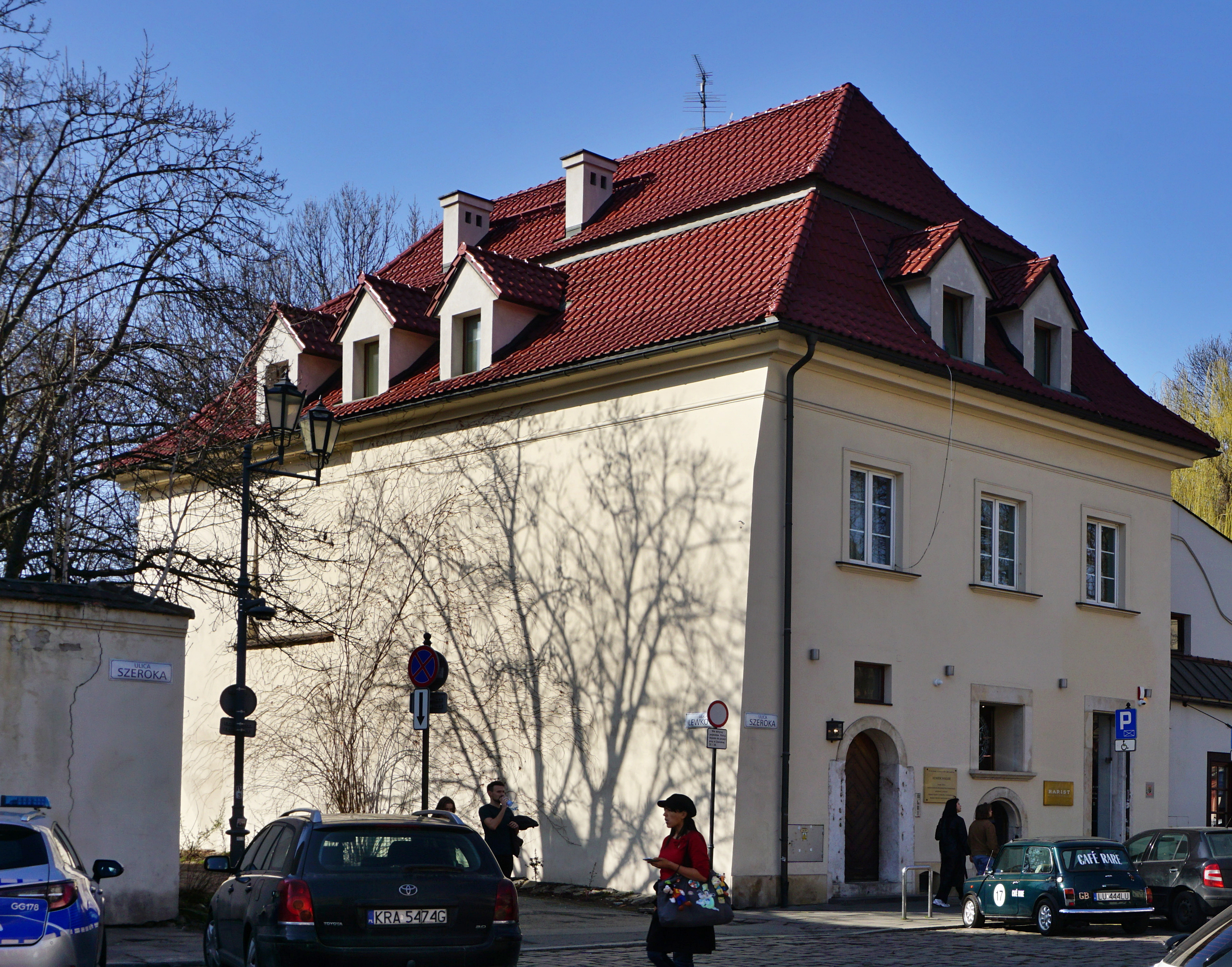
36 Szeroka Street
Tenement house

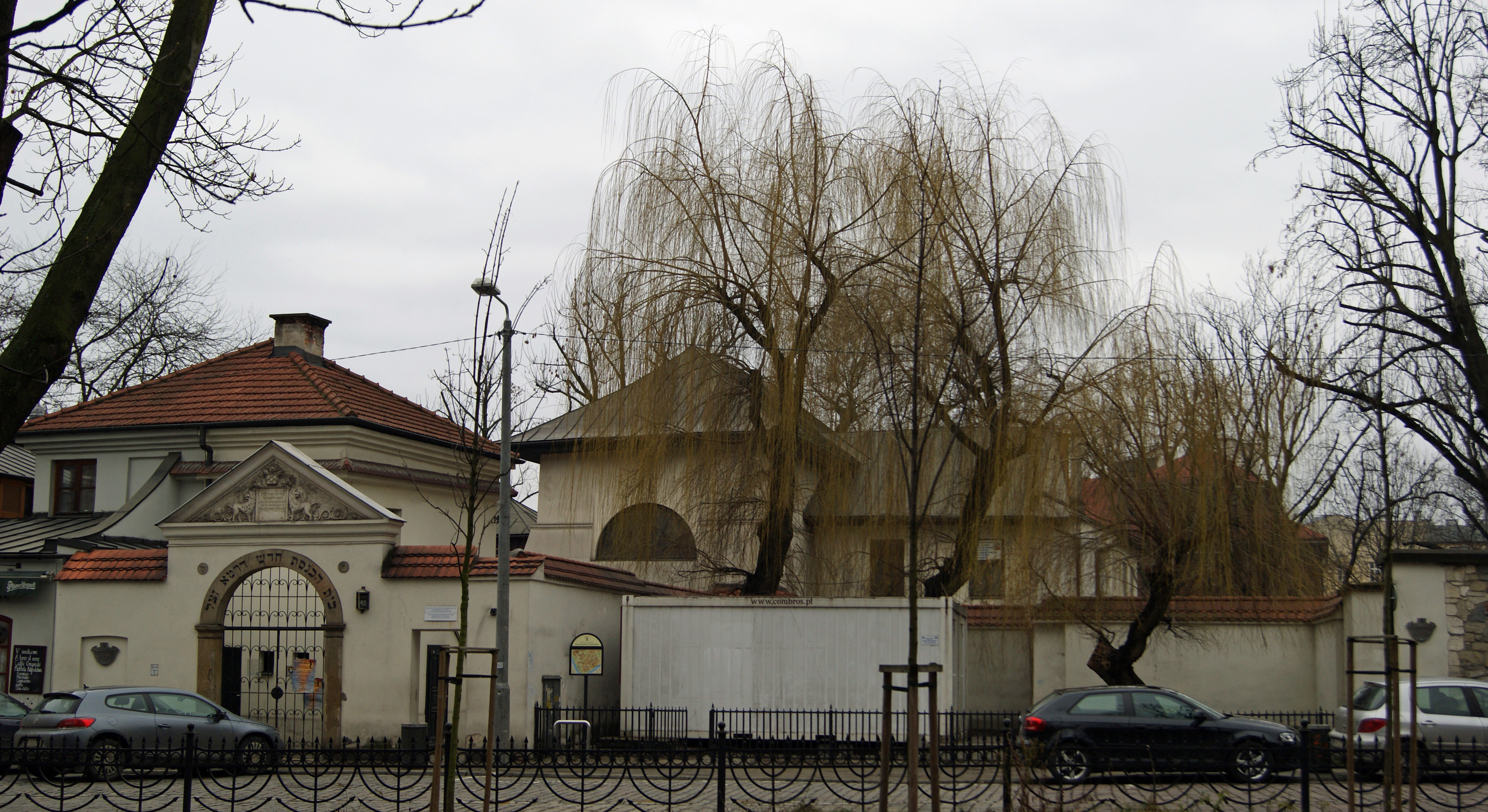
40 Szeroka Street
Remah Synagogue

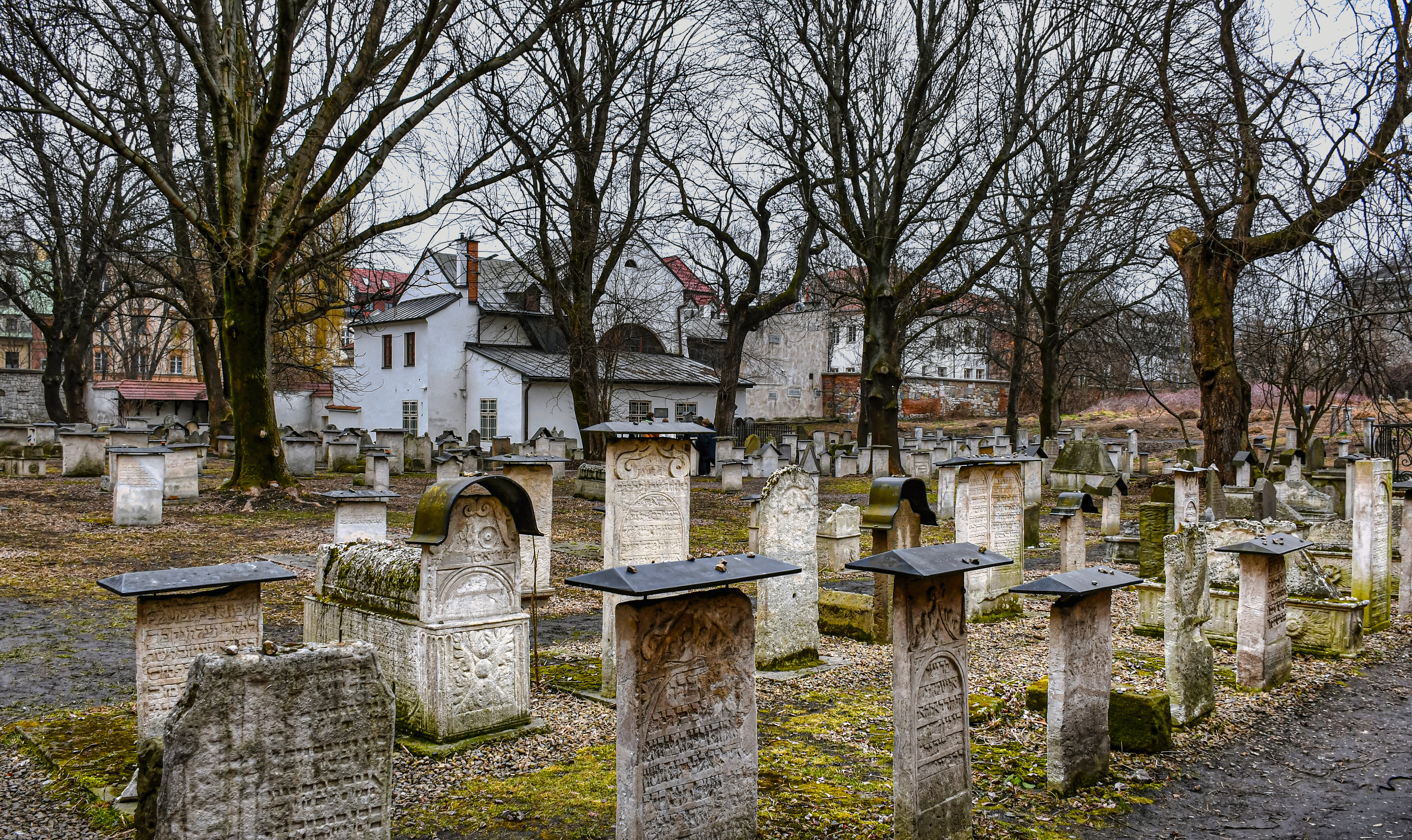
40 Szeroka Street
Remah Cemetery

== Bibliography ==
- (in Polish) * Elżbieta Supranowicz Nazwy ulic Krakowa, Instytut Języka Polskiego PAN, Kraków 1995, ISBN 83-85579-48-6 pp 164–165 (Kraków street names)
- (in Polish) * Praca zbiorowa Encyklopedia Krakowa, wydawca Biblioteka Kraków i Muzeum Krakowa, Kraków 2023, ISBN 978-83-66253-46-9 volume II page 532 (Encyclopedia of Krakow)
- Zabytki Architektury i budownictwa w Polsce (in Polish). Warsaw: Krajowy Ośrodek Badań i Dokumentacji Zabytków. 2007. pp. 333–334. ISBN 97883-92290681.
- Gminna ewidencja zabytków - Kraków (in Polish), Biuletyn Informacji Publicznej, 2025-03-17
