= Sven von Storch =

Chilean-German businessman

Personal details
- Born: 23 December 1970 (age 55) Osorno, Chile
- Party: Alternative für Deutschland (AfD)
- Other political affiliations: Close to Renovación Nacional (Chile) (2016)
- Spouse: Beatrix von Storch (m. 2004)
- Relatives: Klaus von Storch (brother); Rodolfo Navea (uncle)
- Occupation: Businessman, Activist
- Profession: Business manager

Sven von Storch (born 23 December 1970) is a Chilean-German businessman, digital activist, and prominent figure in the Alternative für Deutschland (AfD). He is known for his collaborations with conservative leaders such as Jair Bolsonaro and José Antonio Kast, as well as his admiration for Steve Bannon. Alongside his wife, Beatrix von Storch, he has been instrumental in promoting far-right ideologies through digital campaigns. Although he does not hold an elected office, he is a significant figure within the AfD and far-right political circles in Europe and Latin America.

== Early life and education ==
Sven von Storch was born on 23 December 1970 in Osorno, Chile, to a family of aristocratic German descent. His father moved to Chile after the Second World War following the expropriation of the family estate in Parchow, Mecklenburg, by the Soviet occupation forces. In Chile, his father rebuilt his life as an agricultural entrepreneur and married a woman of German descent.

Sven grew up in Chile as one of four sons. His older brother, Klaus, is a renowned aerospace engineer. After completing his secondary education, Sven moved to Germany in 1988 to pursue a BA in business administration. Following the reunification of Germany, his brother Thomas successfully reclaimed their grandparents' estate. Thomas died in an airplane accident in 2004.

== Political activism and career ==
Sven von Storch is a prominent figure in the Alternative für Deutschland (AfD), a far-right political party in Germany. Alongside his wife, Beatrix von Storch, he has been involved in digital campaigns promoting conservative and far-right ideologies. According to scholar Alexander Häusler, the couple is responsible for a network of media campaigns that advocate for euroscepticism, anti-globalism, anti-communism, criticism of gender studies and sexual education, opposition to same-sex marriage, and opposition to immigration.

Sven has also collaborated with international conservative leaders, including Jair Bolsonaro of Brazil and José Antonio Kast of Chile. He is an admirer of Steve Bannon, the former strategist for Donald Trump. His involvement in far-right politics has made him a controversial figure in both Europe and Latin America.

== Views and controversies ==
Sven von Storch's political views align with far-right ideologies, including opposition to immigration, euroscepticism, and anti-globalism. He has been criticized for his close ties to far-right leaders and his role in promoting divisive political campaigns. Despite not holding an elected office, he remains a significant influencer within the AfD and far-right circles.

== Personal life ==
Sven von Storch married Beatrix von Storch, a German politician and AfD member, in 2004. The couple is known for their shared political activism and far-right advocacy. Sven's brother, Klaus, is a prominent aerospace engineer, and his uncle, Rodolfo Navea, is a well-known figure in Chilean politics.
