= Stork (surname) =

Stork is a surname. Notable people with the surname include:

- Alberto van Klaveren Stork (born 1948), Dutch-born Chilean political scientist, lawyer and diplomat
- Alfred Stork (1871–1945), Canadian businessman and politician
- Ankie Stork (c. 1922–2015), Dutch resistance fighter during World War II
- Clarence Stork (1896–1970), English-born Canadian farmer and politician
- Eric O. Stork (1927-2014), American Environmental Protection Agency regulator
- Gilbert Stork (1921–2017), Belgian-born American chemist
- Hermann Stork (1911–1962), German diver and 1936 Olympic bronze medalist
- Janice Stork, American businessperson and mayor of Lancaster, Pennsylvania (1990–1998)
- Jeff Stork (born 1960), American head women's volleyball coach and former volleyball player
- Olga Stork (born 1998), Lithuanian rhythmic gymnast - see 2014 Rhythmic Gymnastics World Championships
- Sture Stork (1930-2002), Swedish sailor in the 1956 and 1964 Olympics
- Travis Lane Stork (born 1972), a doctor on The Bachelor and The Doctors American TV shows
- Wendy Stork, UK tennis player - see 1947 Wimbledon Championships – Women's singles
- William Stork (died 1768), oculist in England and the American colonies

== See also ==
- Henry Knight Storks (1811–1874), British Army lieutenant-general and colonial governor
