= Markus Storck =

German bicycle designer and developer

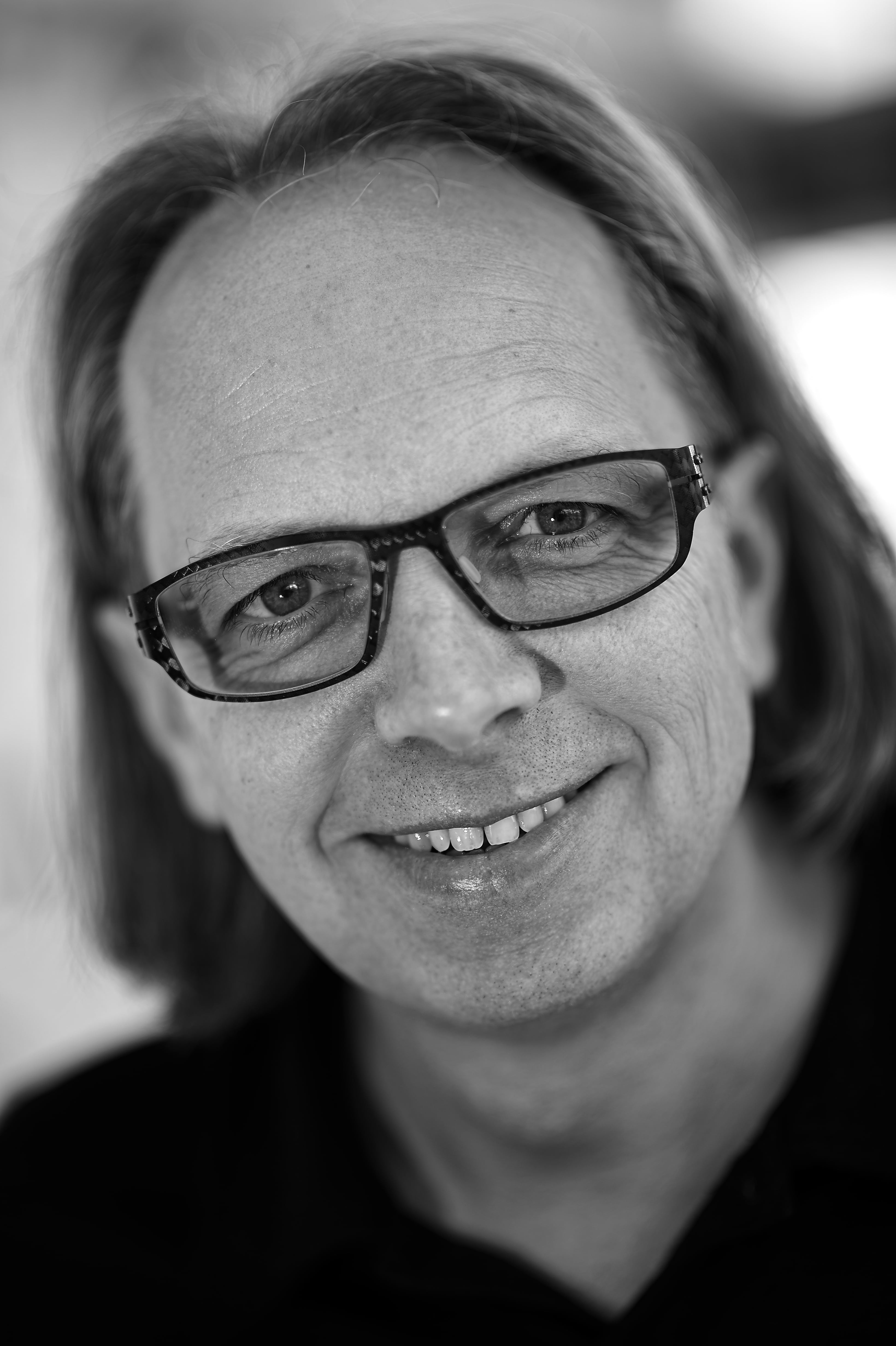
- Markus Storck, bicycle designer and founder of Storck Bicycle
- Born: Frankfurt am Main, Germany
- Occupation: Managing Director at Storck Bicycle
- Years active: 1986–present
- Known for: Founder of Storck Bicycle, Co-Founder of One Of Seven GmbH
- Spouse: Helena Storck

Markus Storck is a German bicycle designer and developer, known for creating the lightest racing bike fork in the world, made of carbon fiber, and the first ever carbon fiber bicycle crank. He is the managing director and founder of Storck Bicycle, designer, and innovator, and his current developments hold the world record lightness and stiffness to weight ratios.

== Early life ==
Storck was born in 1964 in Frankfurt am Main, Germany, where he worked in his parents' bicycle shop, and the first German retailer of Cannondale bicycles. Storck comes from a long lineage of bicyclists and bike racers. His great, great-grandfather joined a cycling club in 1876 and was a member for over 25 years. His grandfather, Willi Muller, and granduncle were professional racers on the Opel professional racing team, with his grandfather winning several track and road races. Most of his extended family either competed in races or was heavily involved in cycling.

Storck started biking at an early age and competed in his first road race at six. His grandparents and parents owned several bicycle shops and Storck was involved in the shops at a young age. As a teenager, his parents opened another shop which Storck ran after school.

His family interest in bicycles led him to complete a business course in the bicycle trade, followed by launching his first business, Bike-tech, in 1986. He founded Storck Bike-tech GmbH in 1989 and Storck Bike-tech, Inc. in the US in 1992, and in 1995 rebranded the company under the name "Storck Bicycle".

== Career ==
=== Storck Bike-tech ===
Early in Storck's career, his focus was on the import and trade of bicycles from Klein, Merlin, Fat Chance, Ritchey, Crank Brothers, as well as bike frames from Taiwan and Japan he rebranded under the Storck name.

In 1990, Storck traveled to Japan to study under bicycle master frame-builder and founder of Toyo, Yoshiaki Ishigaki. He learned to work with steel, titanium, aluminum, and magnesium to build custom bike frames, which later led to his carbon fiber innovations.

Storck went on to engineer and develop the world's first ever carbon fiber bicycle crank in 1992, which started selling in 1993. Weighing at 280g they were the lightest cranks ever built and the innovative use of carbon fiber founded the standard Storck would follow in future bicycles, components, and accessories.

=== Storck Bicycle ===
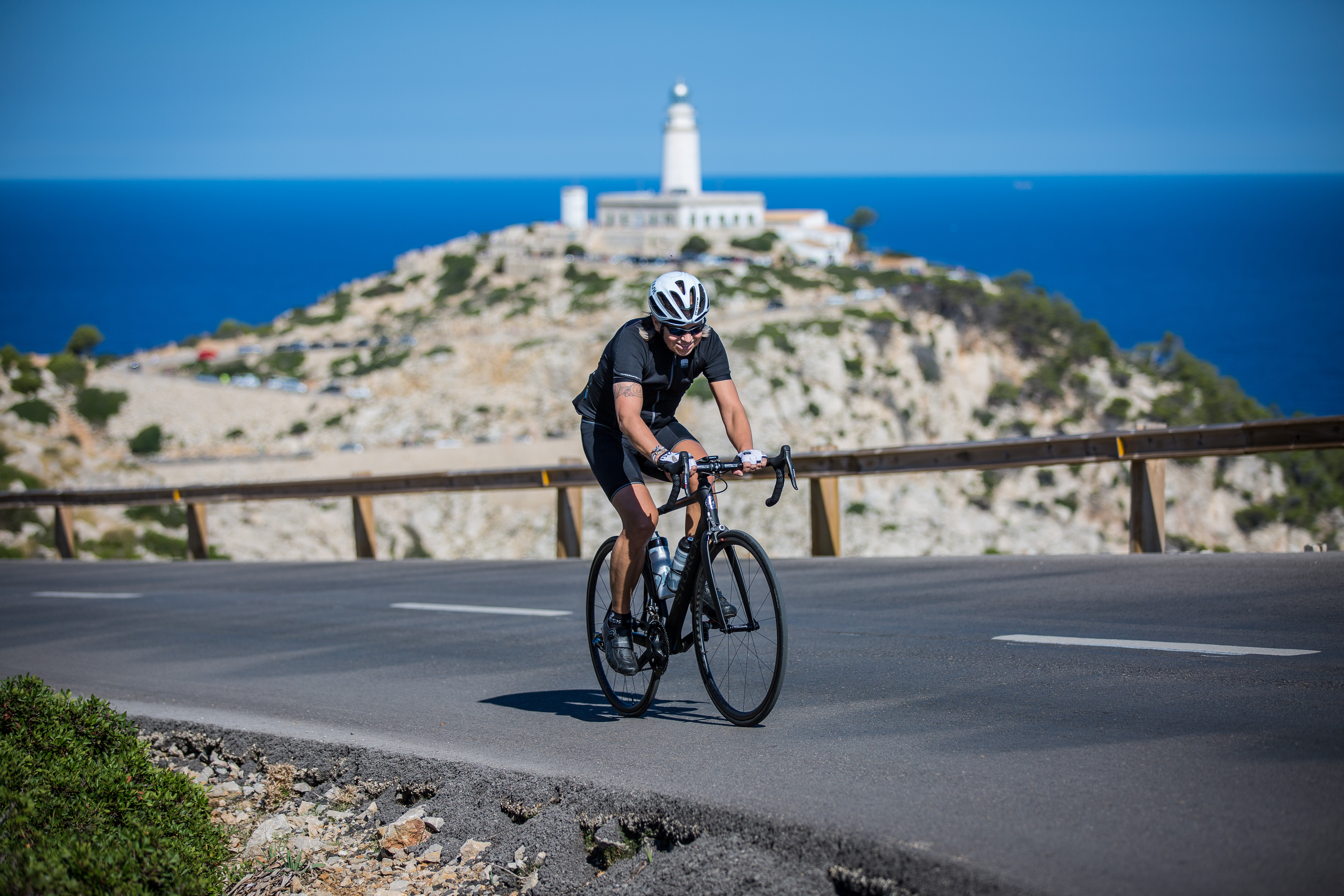
Markus Storck on one of his Storck road bikes at Cap Formentor, Mallorca

A contract termination with Klein bicycles in 1990 due to its acquisition by Trek bicycles led to the rebranding of Storck Bike-tech and Markus Storck's renewed design and development of his own bicycle and component production.

In 1995, Storck began the design and manufacturing of aluminum frame bicycles in Portland, Oregon with the assistance of Kinesis USA, a subsidiary of Kinesis Industry, and in 1996, Dutch mountain bicyclist Bart Brentjens won the gold medal at the first cross-country mountain bike race of the 1996 Olympic Games in Atlanta, Georgia, on a mountain bike of Storck's design collaboration with Hercules, Schauff, and American Eagle.

Markus Storck's innovations using Vacuum Void Controlled production technology allowed him to reduce the resin content of the high-grade carbon bicycle frames by a third, allowing his future designs to have lighter, stiffer frames, while maintaining comfort and stability.

Between 1997 and 2017, Storck has designed and produced over 100 bicycles, including road bikes, cross- and triathlon bikes, mountain bikes, and hybrids.

In 2008, Storck opened up the first Storck brand store in Korea followed by stores in Singapore, Taiwan, Malaysia, Thailand, Philippines, Japan, UK, Switzerland.

Storck Bicycle was last reported to have earnings in 2007 of €3.9 million.

== Other ventures ==
In 1990, together with his friend Erich Reiss, Storck founded the Eurobike show, a bicycle trade fair which has grown from 268 international exhibitors to over 1,000. Eurobike is considered the world's largest bicycle trade show.

In 2003, he was a jury member of the iF Industrial Design forum in Hanover, for their international design competition.

In 2005, Storck was a jury member of the Materialica Design Awards in Munich.

In 2008, Storck, along with Energy SüwagSupplier under a German government funded project to explore electromobility in the Rhine-Main region, designed and manufactured 200 custom battery-powered eBikes (pedelec) and solar charging stations.

In 2015, Storck partnered with Rehau to design a new eBike concept for the German Federal Ministry of Economics and Energy, called nam:e: In 2016, he received the JEC Innovation Award and in 2017, the German Design Award for nam:e:

== One of Seven Projects and Collaborations ==
One of Seven paired Storck with famous brands to design a limited run of bespoke items. Storck collaborated on the design and incorporated carbon fiber into all of the designs. Creating only seven of each product, Storck kept the original of each. In 2021 this led to the founding of their own company for the One of Seven Projects. Together with his wife Helena Storck, they founded the "One of Seven GmbH" in order to further continue similar projects.

=== McLaren ===
In 2015, Storck and McLaren unveiled the super rare McLaren 650S. Storck, McLaren's Special Ops division, and the Dorr Group created what they call an "automotive sculpture." It has all of the internal parts of the McLaren 650S Spider with new design elements, including a paint mixture that shifts from copper to brown, depending on the light. Storck worked with McLaren to use their own carbon fiber parts, so every part is able to be replaced from the factory. In 2016, the McLaren 1of7 received a German Design Award special mention.

=== Blac Carbon Sunglasses ===
Storck teamed up with Blac to create custom carbon sunglasses. Blac uses a proprietary blend of lightweight carbon fiber and titanium to create a light, strong frame.

=== Storck Aeronario Platinum Disc ===
Creating a bike to match the McLaren, Storck used the same paint to create a color-shifting limited run bicycle.

=== Balthasar-Ress Wine ===
Storck and Balthasar-Ress released seven exclusive bottles of wine. The packaging included a handmade wooden box with a matte black surface. Aluminum paper and a laser-engraved plate were used as well to create a unique package.

=== Blaken Rolex ===
Storck next teamed up with Rolex to create an individually designed Blaken watch. The Blaken line uses a Diamond Like Carbon Coating which appears similar to carbon fiber.

=== Aston Martin ===
Storck teamed up with the Q division of Aston Martin to create a new version of the Vanquish, using black satin paint and adding in carbon fiber to much of the vehicle. During the process, Aston Martin created a new manufacturing process for the carbon fiber bodywork. Custom details included hand stitching, the One of Seven symbol and carbon fiber Aston Martin symbols. In 2017, the Aston Martin Vanquish 1of7 received a German Design Award special mention.

=== Hymer RSX / Palmowski ===
2021, Storck has teamed up with the PALMOWSKI motor home center in Bielefeld, Germany, to create a new limited series of a rugged off-road motorhome in the exclusive One of Seven design. The special configuration is based on a Mercedes Sprinter 419 CDI with 190 hp. The result is a HYMER MLT 580 4x42 RSX in the ONE OF SEVEN edition. Both externally and in terms of equipment, the model has numerous special features: The power of 249 hp, the vehicle has all-wheel drive with gear reduction and a Rockstar X package. The Rockstar X package also includes premium brown saddle leather trim and 18-inch forged wheels in ONE OF SEVEN design. Satin carbon fiber elements adorn the interior, while a satin matte Aeratus Dark paint finish gives the SUV a spectacular yet refined look. Highlights such as an integrated sound system, solar panels and a lithium battery pack provide the basis for comfortable off-road adventures. This also includes a spacious garage that can accommodate bicycles.

== Awards and recognition ==
In 1997, Storck entered his Adrenalin "fully" bicycle in the Red Dot competition for design and won first place. This was his first ever international competition.

In 1998, Storck's carbon fiber Power Arms bicycle crank won the design competition.

In 1999, Storck won the design competition again, this time for the Storck "Organic" mountain bike.

In 1999, Storck launched the "Stiletto Light" road bike fork, which weighed 280 grams and was the test winner of Tour bike magazine. Additionally, his carbon fiber Power Arms bicycle crank won the 1999 iF Design Award. Also in 2008, the Fascenario 0.7 IS road bike received the "Milestone" award for the most innovative bike product by Tour magazine, followed by the constructors' classification award in 2009.

In 2002, Markus Storck's "Storck Organic" mountain bike was showcased at the ‘Ingenious Bicycle Patents’ exhibition at the German Patent and Trade Mark Office in Munich.

In 2003 and 2006, Storck's bikes The Adrenalin Carbon and Scenario CD1.0 10th Anniversary were recognized with the iF Product Design Award at Eurobike.

From 2004 through 2017 he received iF Product Design Awards for the Multitask Comfort bicycle, Aero and Aero2 triathlon racing bicycles, the Scenario CD 0.9, Fascenario 0.6 and G2, Fascenario 0.7, and Fascenario 0.8, Carbon Twister Carbon Bar and Ergo Carbon Bar, Rebellion 1.1, the Multitask Raddar, Raddar Multiroad, Aernario G1, RBC180 Carbon Road Bar, the Storck Cycling Gear (apparel) collection, Aernario Platinum, Rebel Seven black edition, Aernario Signature, Aerfast 20th anni, Fascenario.3 Platinum, and Adrenic Platinum bikes.

In 2016, Storck Bicycle received the German Brand Award for outstanding brand communication.

In 2017, Storck received German Design Award awards for his Rehau collaboration eBike "nam:e:," the Adrenic Platinum mountain bike, and the Fascenario.3 road bike.

In 2018, Storck won three German Design Awards for their Aernario Pro, Rebel Nine Pro and Fascenario.3 Pro as well as a Bicycle Brand Award for the T.I.X. Pro.

In 2019, Storck won two German Design Award for their T.I.X. Pro and Aernario Signature

In 2021, Storck won the Red Dot Award for their name:2 and the European product design award (EPDA), International Design Award (IDA) in Gold, German Design Award for their new innovation Cyklaer, which is a new project resulting from a collaboration with Porsche digital, the wholly owned subsidiary of Porsche AG that serves as its digital competence center. Also, the new Aerfast.4, which was developed to be the fastest UCI legal Roadbike, won the International Design Award (IDA) in Silver. Storck Bikes also was able to win a number of Public Choice Awards like the Velomotion User Voting 2022 for the best "Highend Roadbike" Aerfast.4, and the best "Middleclass Roadbike" Fascenario.3 Comp.

== Speaker ==
Due to Storcks long time experience in the Bike-Industry he is a well-received speaker in events and podcasts. Storck is oftentimes speaking about the development of the brand and marketing, the delevlopment of carbon bikes, his sportslife and interest, as well as about business development in times of change.

== Personal life ==
Markus Storck has been married to his wife Helena for twenty years. He speaks fluent English.
