= Stork Ridge =

Stork Ridge (67°31′S 68°12′W) is an ENE-WSW ridge, 1 nautical mile (1.9 km) long and rising to about 420 m, located 3.5 nautical miles (6 km) northwest of Rothera Point, southeast Adelaide Island. The naming of the ridge follows a hydrographic survey conducted from HMS marked with a staff and flag, giving the appearance of a stork on the ridge.
