= Klaus von Storch =

Chilean aerospace engineer (born 1962)

Klaus von Storch Krüger
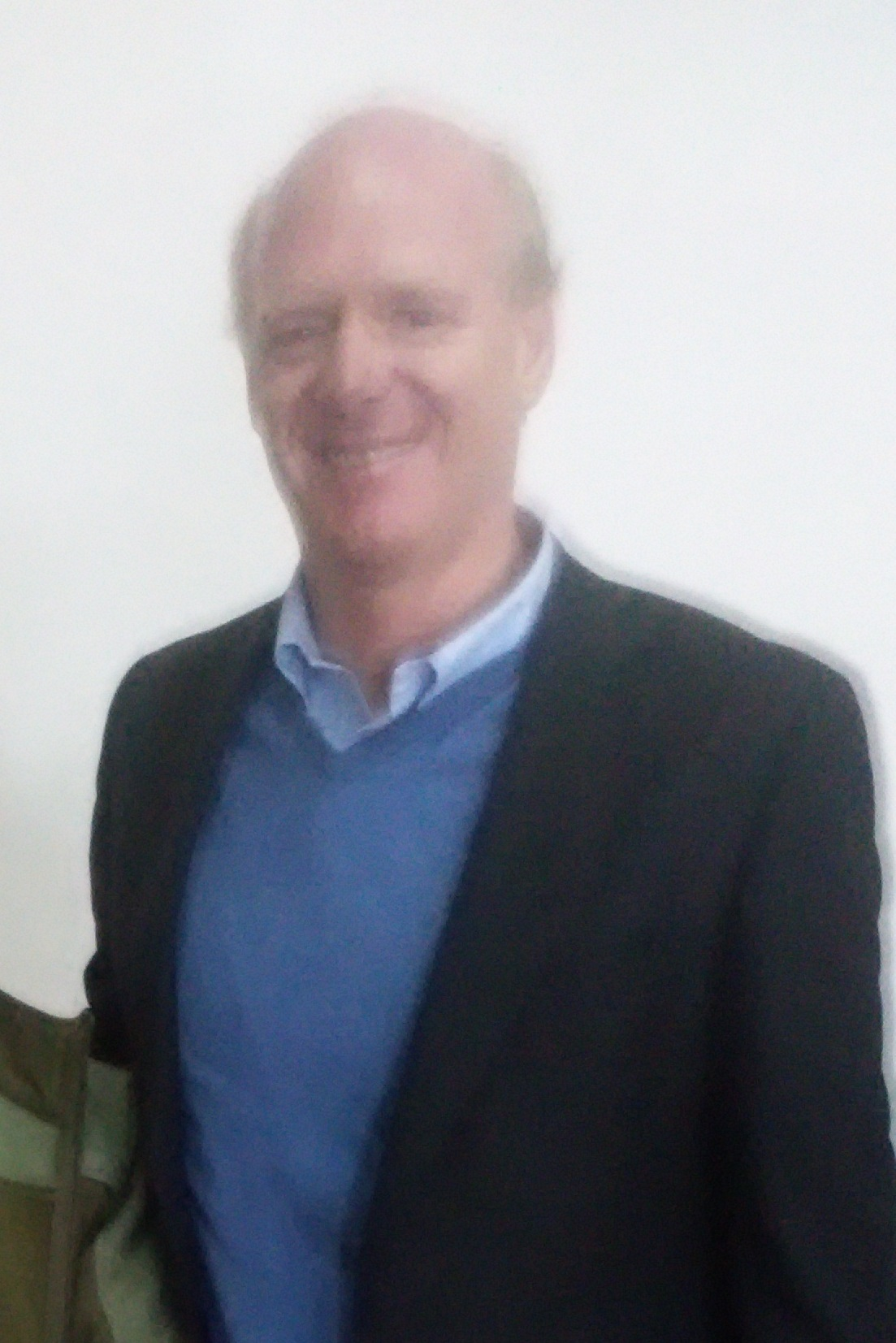
- Born: 20 February 1962 (age 64); Osorno, Chile
- Occupation: Aerospace engineer
- Space career

Chilean Space Agency Astronaut
- Status: Active
- Missions: None

Klaus Bernhard von Storch Krüger (born February 20, 1962) is a Chilean aerospace engineer and astronaut trainee.

Von Storch was born in Osorno, in southern Chile. In 1992, he was selected by the Chilean Space Agency for the preparation for the flight on the Space Shuttle. In 2001, he was considered as candidate for that flight aboard a Russian spacecraft during a taxi flight to the ISS in 2003 but in September 2002 the medical board at the IMBP was not passed. As of 2016, Von Storch aspires to fly into space in the future. He is also brother-in-law to Alternative for Germany politician Beatrix von Storch, who is married with his brother Sven.
