= Storck, Virginia =

Unincorporated community in Virginia, US

Coordinates: 38°25′09″N 77°36′49″W

Storck is an unincorporated community in Stafford County, in the U.S. state of Virginia.
