= Wolf Popper Synagogue =

Former synagogue in Kraków, Poland

Wolf Popper Synagogue Bociana Synagogue Little Synagogue
- Synagoga Wolfa Poppera; Synagoga Bociana; Synagoga Mała
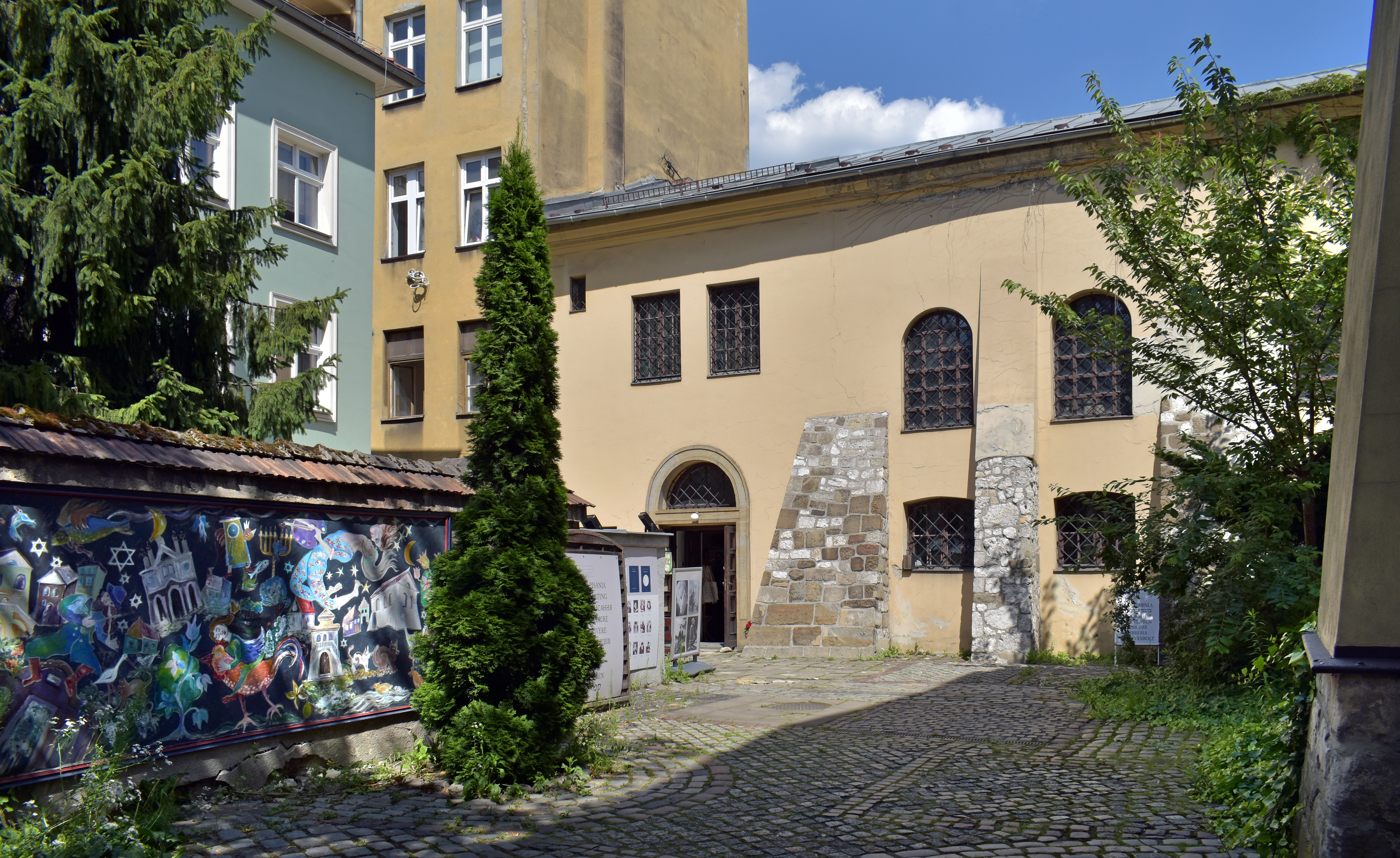
- View from Szeroka Street

Religion
- Affiliation: Judaism (former)
- Rite: Nusach Ashkenaz
- Ecclesiastical or organizational status: Synagogue (1625–1965); Cultural center (since 1965)
- Status: Inactive (as a synagogue); Repurposed

Location
- Location: 16 Szeroka Street; Kraków, Kazimierz
- Country: Poland
- Interactive map of Wolf Popper Synagogue; Bociana Synagogue; Little Synagogue
- Coordinates: 50°03′08.8″N 19°56′55.7″E

Architecture
- Type: Synagogue architecture
- Style: Baroque
- Founder: Wolf Popper
- Completed: 1620
- Materials: Stone

UNESCO World Heritage Site
- Type: Cultural
- Criteria: iv
- Designated: 1978
- Part of: Historic Centre of Kraków
- Reference no.: 29
- Region: Europe and North America

Historic Monument of Poland
- Designated: 1994-09-08
- Part of: Kraków historical city complex
- Reference no.: M.P. 1994 nr 50 poz. 418

The Wolf Popper Synagogue (Polish: Synagoga Wolfa Poppera), also known as the Bociana Synagogue (Polish: Synagoga Bociana) and Little Synagogue (Polish: Synagoga Mała), is a historic former Jewish congregation and synagogue, located at 16 Szeroka Street, in Kazimierz, the former district of Kraków, Poland.

Founded by the eponymous Wolf Popper and completed in 1620, the synagogue served as a house of prayer until it went into decline after the passing of its founder and chief benefactor. The former Popper Synagogue serves as bookshop and also as an art gallery in the women's area upstairs.

== Architecture ==
The Wolf Popper Synagogue was one of the most splendid Jewish houses of prayer in the old Jewish quarter of Kazimierz. Its entrance was once adorned with openwork doors depicting four animals: an eagle, a leopard, a lion, and a buck deer, which symbolize the main traits of a devout man. The synagogue featured porches, annexes, Aron Kodesh, rich furniture. and decorations.

== History ==
Wolf Popper, nicknamed "The Stork" for having been able to stand on one leg when lost in deep thought, founded the synagogue in 1620. He financed its construction towards the end of his life. Popper made his fortune in large-scale international trade in cloth and saltpetre (main ingredient in the making of gunpowder), and eventually became Kazimierz's richest banker with a fortune reaching 200,000 zloty, making him one of the richest men in Europe.

The Popper family lost much of its wealth following Wolf Popper's death in main part due to historical wars, local epidemics, fires, and costly tributes of allegiance. The once-grand synagogue never again enjoyed the wealth of its original sponsor, who was the only person that could prevent its slow but unrelenting decline. The rich interior was destroyed by the Nazis during World War II. Its Arabesque doors were moved to the Wolfson Museum in Jerusalem.

In 1965, the Jewish Council handed over the building to the communist authorities. In the ensuing renovation, most traces of its previous religious role were erased and the Old Town Youth Cultural Centre (YCC) was established in its place. At present, the Centre is a vibrant and busy place with long-running programs, educational activities, art studio, and classes in Jewish dance. The YCC Study Workshop on Jewish History and Culture, is an initiative that began in 1995 as the first of its kind in Poland. Art classes are designed to widen the students' knowledge of symbolism and artistic motifs in Jewish art. An annual competition in art and photography is being held there as well as lectures on Jewish Kazimierz, the Holocaust, and a series of film showings.

== Notable members ==
- Edward Mosberg and family
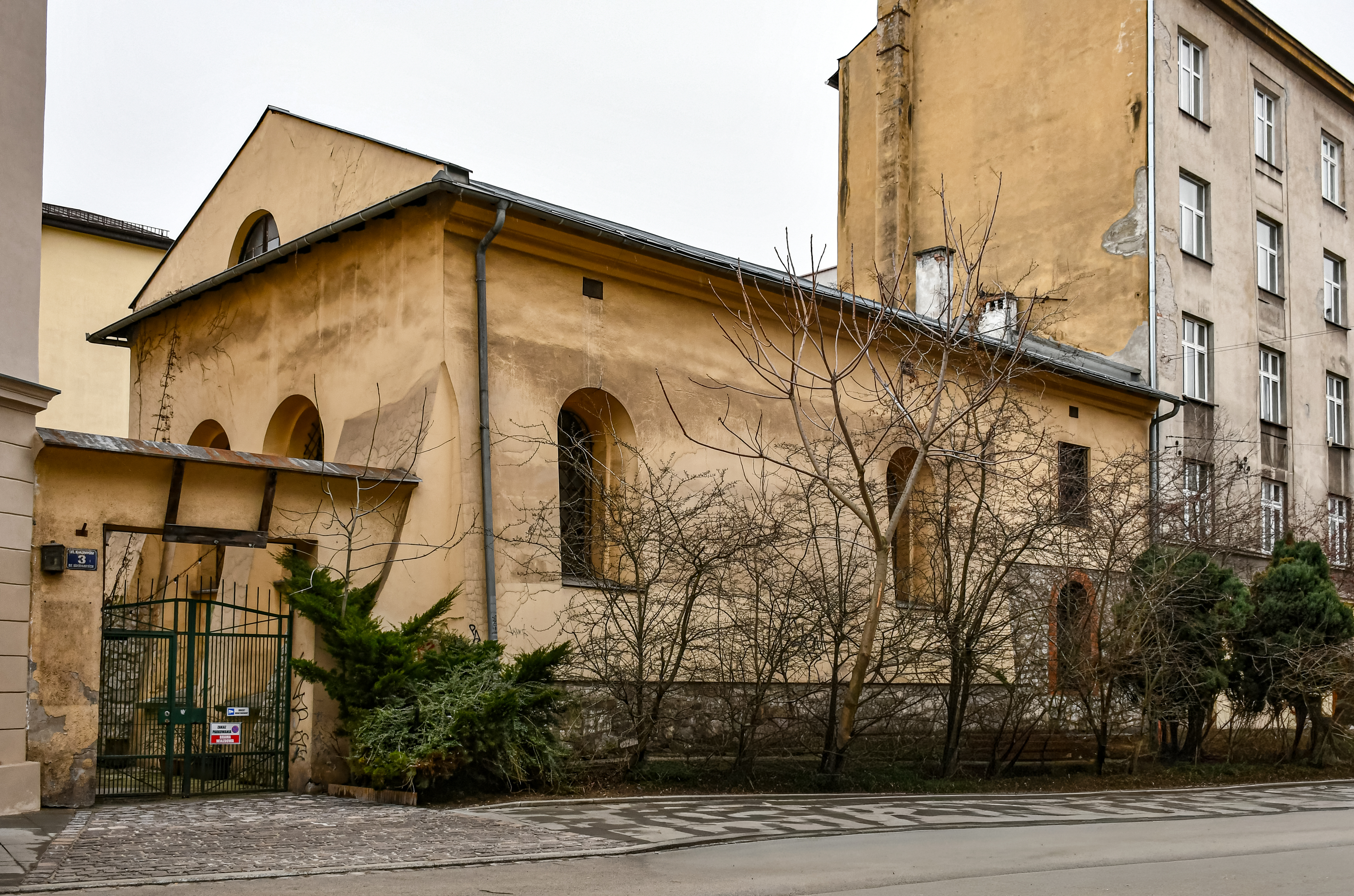
View from Dajwór Street (from E)

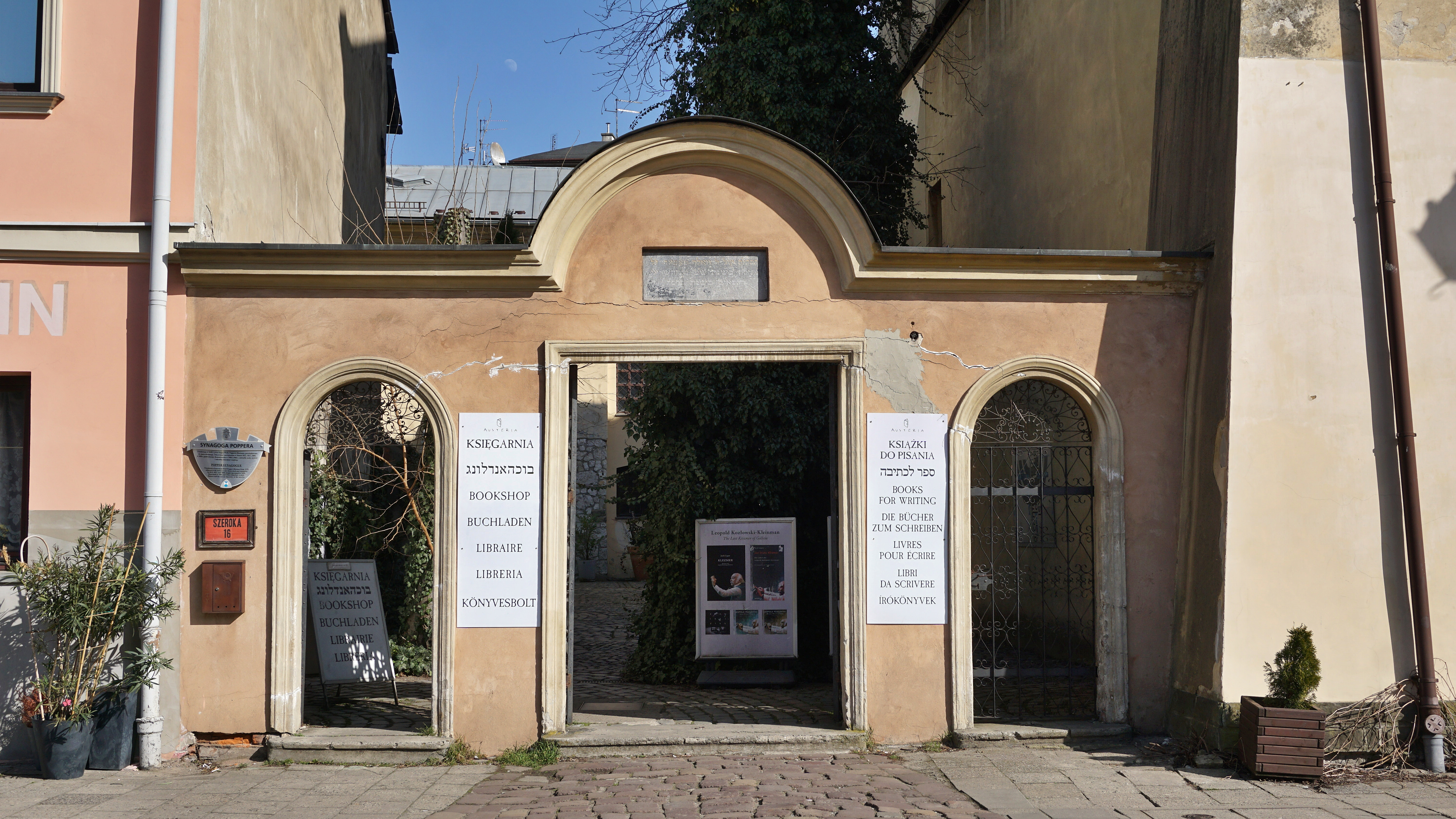
Inner courtyard with exit to Szeroka Street

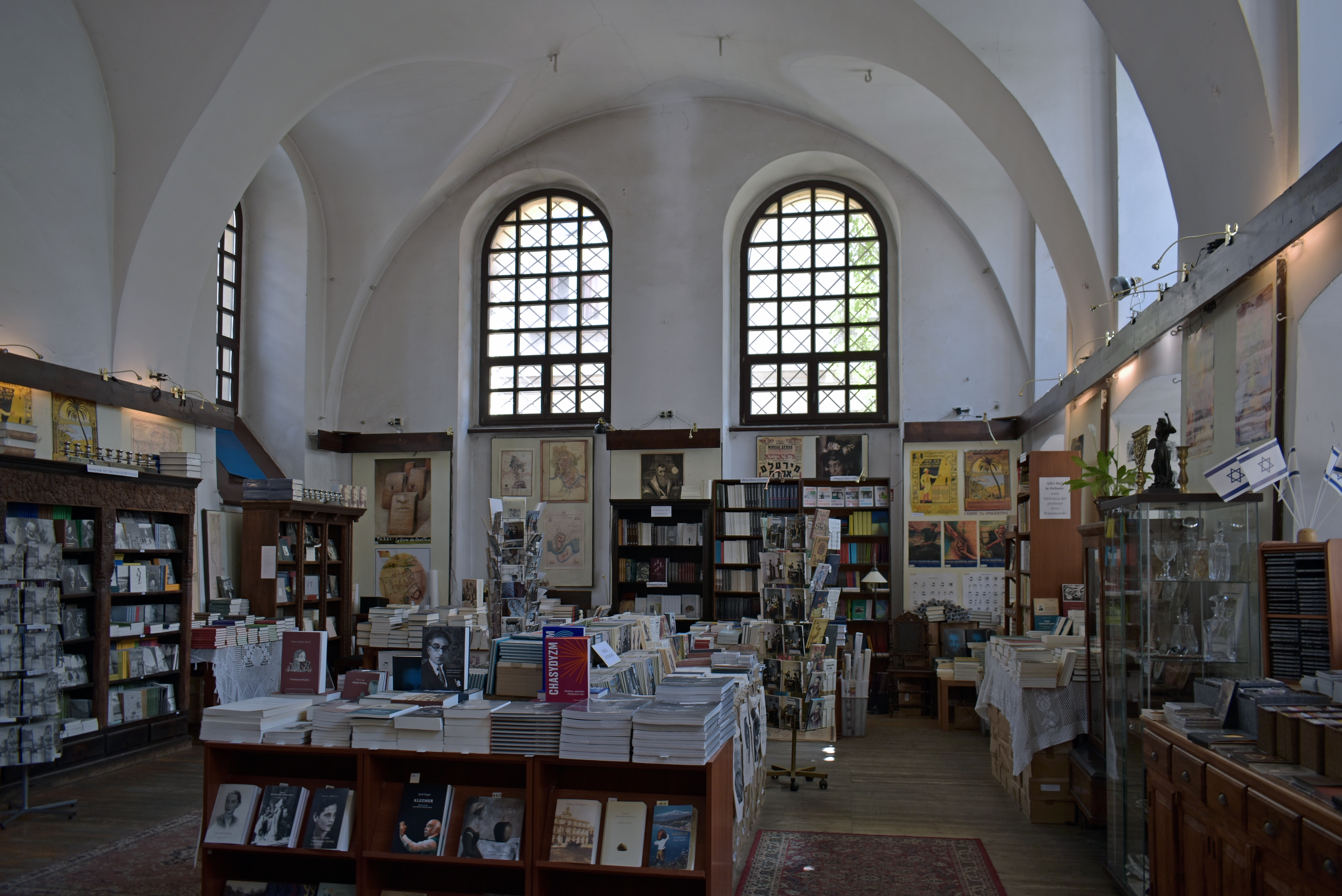
Interior

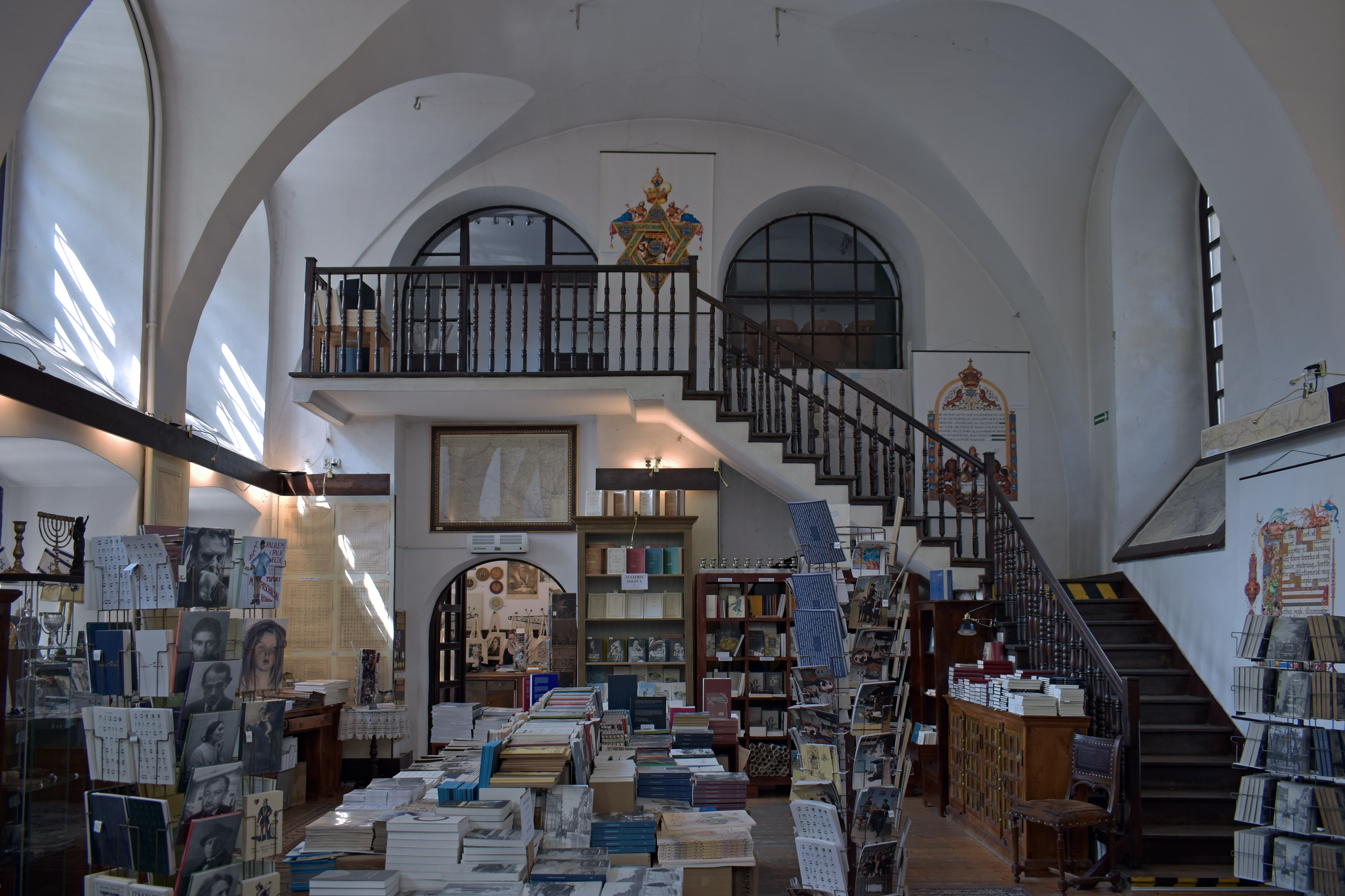
Interior with gallery for women

== See also ==
- Chronology of Jewish Polish history
- Culture of Kraków
- History of the Jews in Poland
- List of active synagogues in Poland
- Synagogues of Kraków
