= Stanisław Kazimierczyk =

Polish Catholic priest (1433–1489)

Saint Stanisław Kazimierczyk C.R.L.
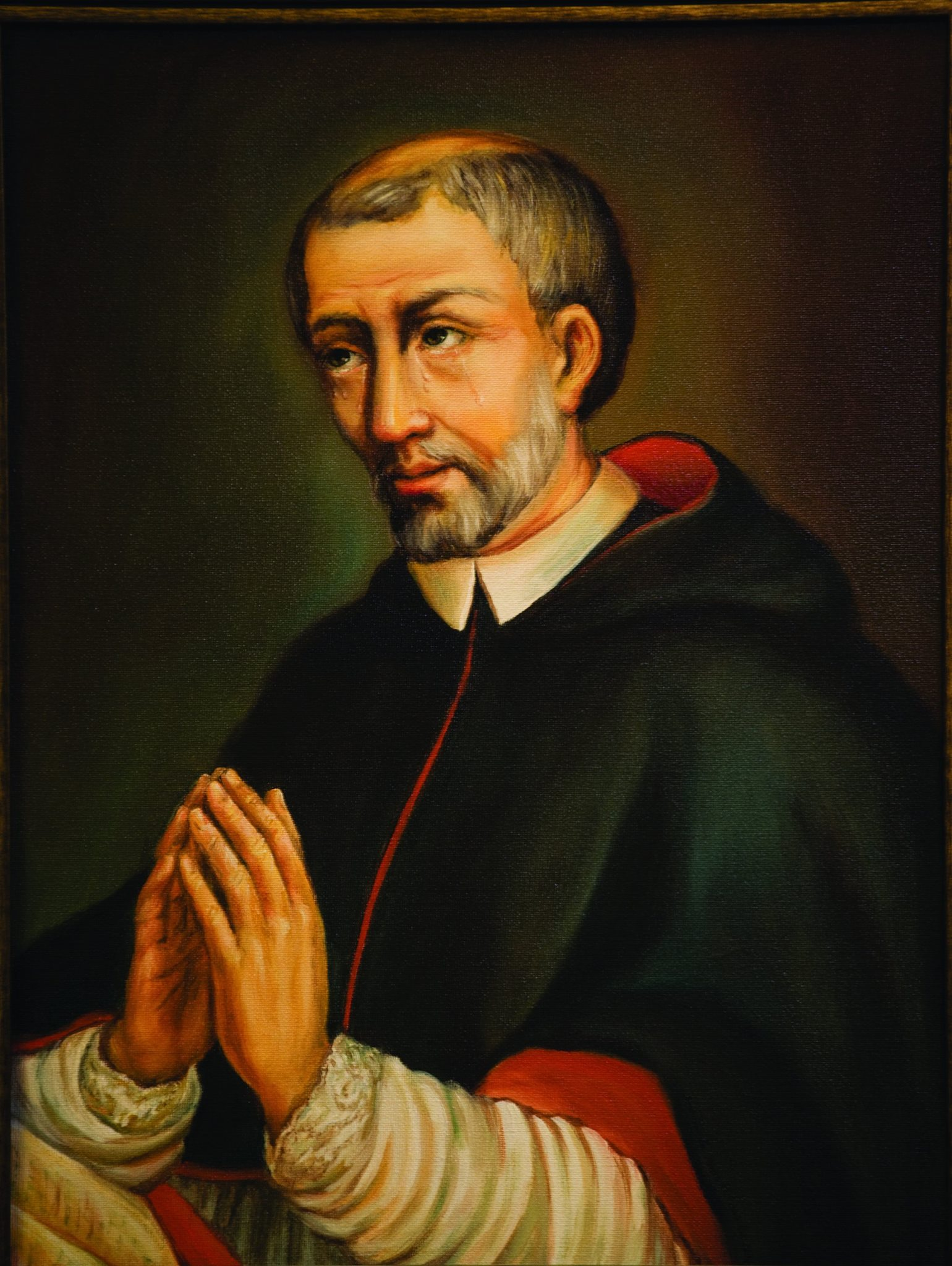

Priest
- Born: Stanisław Sołtys; 27 September 1433; Kazimierz, Kraków, Crown of the Kingdom of Poland
- Died: 3 May 1489 (aged 55); Kazimierz, Kraków, Crown of the Kingdom of Poland
- Venerated in: Catholic Church
- Beatified: 18 April 1993, Saint Peter's Square, Vatican City by Pope John Paul II
- Canonized: 17 October 2010, Saint Peter's Square, Vatican City by Pope Benedict XVI
- Major shrine: Corpus Christi Basilica, Kraków, Poland
- Feast: 3 May; 5 May (Poland)
- Attributes: Priest's cassock
- Patronage: Preachers

Stanisław Kazimierczyk (born Stanisław Sołtys, 27 September 1433 – 3 May 1489) was a Polish Catholic priest and a professed member of the Canons Regular of the Lateran. He became noted for his ardent devotions to both the Eucharist and to his personal patron saint, Stanislaus of Szczepanów, as well as for his charitable dedication to the ill and poor of Kraków.

The canonization cause started under Pope John Paul II on 14 October 1986 and he was titled as a Servant of God. This came after previous attempts in the past to launch the process though the cause started at that time due to the personal intervention of the pope who was a cardinal at the time. That same pope named him as Venerable on 21 December 1992 at the same time he approved the beatification which was celebrated on 18 April 1993. Pope Benedict XVI later canonized the late priest as a saint of the Catholic Church on 17 October 2010 in Saint Peter's Square.

== Life ==
Stanisław Sołtys was born 27 September 1433 in Kraków to Maciej Sołtys and Jadwiga. His parents had long wanted a child and he was born on exactly the same date that the remains of Stanislaus of Szczepanów were being moved. His parents were members of the Brotherhood of the Blessed Sacrament.

He received his education from the Canons Regular of the Lateran at their school not too far from his home which was attached to their convent and to the local parish church of Corpus Christi Basilica that the order administered. He went on to receive doctorates in theological studies and in his philosophical studies from the Jagiellonian University in Kraków. He received a bachelor's degree in 1451.

The successful completion of his studies in 1456 saw him enter the Canons Regular of the Lateran and thus became a novice in his novitiate. He took the religious name of "Stanisław Kazimierczyk". His choice was due to the shrine of the popular Saint Stanisław, a former Bishop of Krakow, to whom he had a strong devotion his entire life.

He was ordained as a priest in 1456 and was then named as the vice-prior of the order despite being a new priest and not having enough experience. He was also made the novice master in charge of new candidates to the order. He also dedicated himself to the care of the ill and the poor and was noted for the deep devotion of the religious services that he celebrated. He developed a reputation for great spiritual insight as a confessor. It was his allure as a preacher and confessor that saw people seek him out to preach and hear their confessions. He preached in strong defense of the doctrine of the Real Presence in the Eucharist against the preachings of the Polish followers of John Wycliffe and Jan Hus. It was due to this that he gained the title "Apostle of the Blessed Sacrament". Saint John Cantius – a colleague of his at the Jagiellonian and a major scientist of the period – was a close friend of his.

The priest fasted numerous times and kept vigils on several occasions. He slept little and often slept on the ground more as a penitential act. On one occasion he went to visit the tomb of his patron saint when he saw the Mother of God with the Infant Jesus in her arms; Saint Stanisław and other saints were around her. He often delivered his sermons in German as well as his native Polish. King John I Albert once attributed an 8 September 1487 battle win against the Ottoman Empire to him.

He died in mid-1489 in Kraków and had been known in his life as a living saint. He had fallen quite ill at Lent and towards his death requested anointing. He put his hands on his conferees' heads to bless them and to bid them farewell and died with his hands upraised to entrust his soul to God.

The faithful referred to him often as "Blessed" despite the fact that he had not been beatified but was called this due to his great reputation for personal holiness – in the 1500s this title was recorded as being given. His remains were moved in 1632 after the priest Martin Kłoczyński commissioned a splendid altar in his honor to house the remains; a total of 176 purported miracles were reported to have taken place in the first year since his death.

== Sainthood ==
The Canons Regular of the Lateran made several requests to the pope to seek beatification in 1773 but no cause was ever initiated. The Cardinal Archbishop of Kraków Karol Józef Wojtyła (the future Pope John Paul II) asked the order in 1971 to collect existing documents and evidence on the life of the late priest and set up a historical commission to aid them in this on 15 December 1972.

The beatification process was launched under Pope John Paul II on 14 October 1986 and the priest was titled as a Servant of God once the Congregation for the Causes of Saints (CCS) issued the official nihil obstat to the cause. Cardinal Franciszek Macharski inaugurated the diocesan process on 17 December 1987 and later oversaw its successful completion on 22 January 1998 while the CCS validated this process in Rome on 11 November 1988. The postulation later submitted the Positio dossier to the CCS in 1990 for assessment.

Historians met and approved the cause's direction on 15 January 1991, deeming no historical obstacles existed, while theologians assented to the cause on 5 June 1992; the CCS followed suit on 1 December 1992. On 21 December 1992 John Paul II both named him as Venerable upon the confirmation of his heroic virtue and approved his longstanding "cultus" which allowed for the pope to preside over the beatification on 18 June 1993 as a solemnization of that "cultus".

The process for a miracle required for his sanctification opened on 22 September 1995 and closed on 29 February 1996 while it later received validation from the CCS on 25 October 1996. The medical board approved this on 23 April 2009 as did theologians on 8 July 2009 and the C.C.S. on 29 September 2009. Pope Benedict XVI approved this healing to be a miracle on 19 December 2009 and on 19 February 2010 confirmed the date for canonization; the pope canonized him on 17 October 2010 in Saint Peter's Square.

The postulator at the time of the canonization was Emilio Dunoyer.

== Feast Day ==
- 3 May – commemoration
- 5 May – commemoration in Poland
