= Bożego Ciała Street =

Street in Kraków, Poland

Bożego Ciała street
Kraków
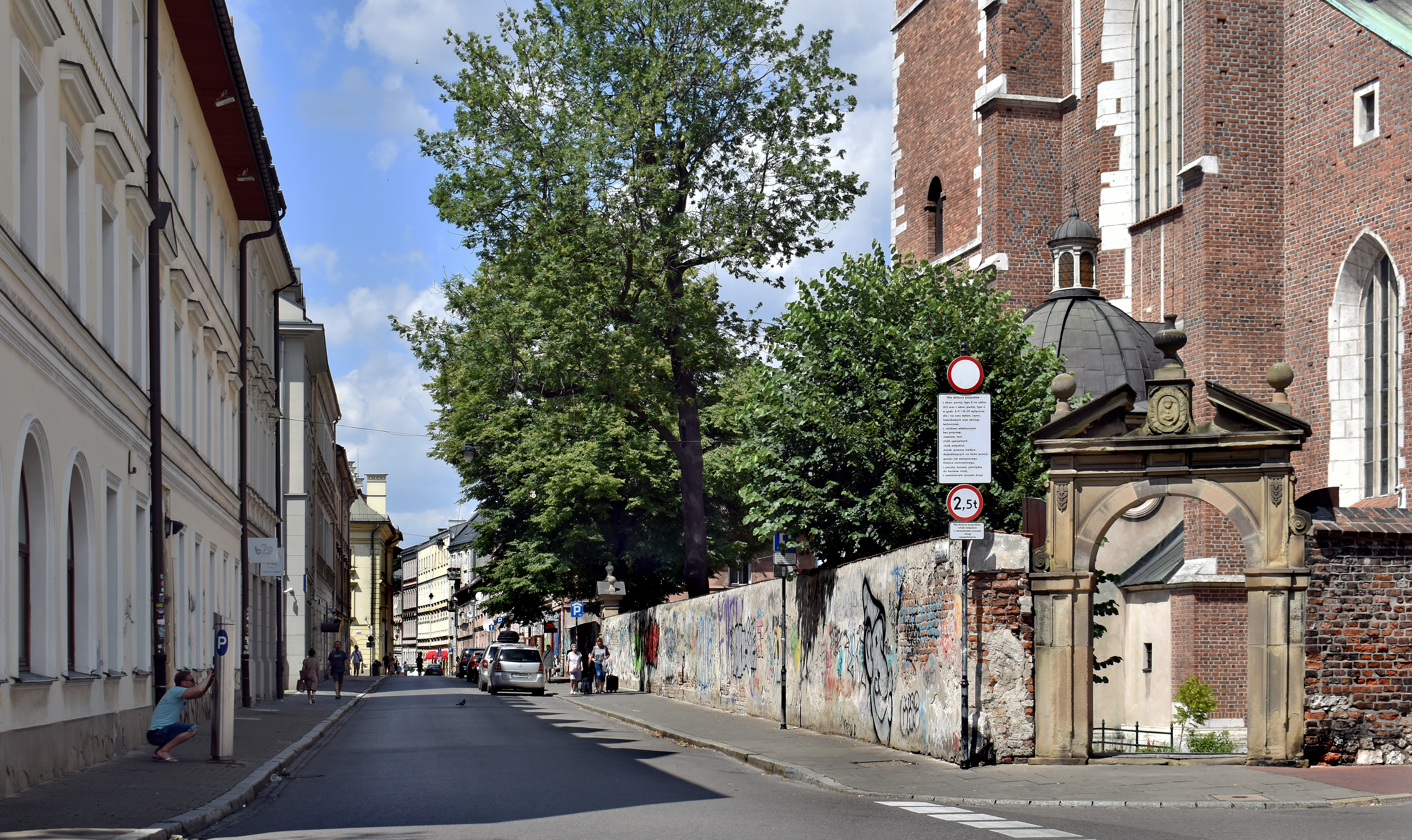
- View from Wolnica Square, on the right the entrance to the Canons' Monastery and Corpus Christi Basilica
- Interactive map of Bożego Ciała street
- Part of: Kraków Old Town district
- Owner: City of Kraków
- Location: Kraków, Poland

Bożego Ciała Street is a street in Kraków, located in district Old Town in Kazimierz.

It connects Józef Dietl Street with Wolnica Square.

== History ==
It was laid out as part of the founding plan of Kazimierz in 1335. The current name has been in use since 1818. Initially, the street was undeveloped, with only the building of the parish school adjacent to it. After the demolition of the city walls of Kazimierz in 1842, the street was extended to Miodowa Street. Most of the buildings date from this period. In 1892, the street was further extended to Józef Dietl Street.

== Buildings ==
The buildings are primarily tenement houses from the late 19th century.

- 1 Bożego Ciała Street (49 Józef Dietl Street) – Tenement house. Designed by Karol Knaus, 1897.
- 2 Bożego Ciała Street (51 Józef Dietl Street) – Tenement house. Designed by Maksymilian Nitsch, 1899.
- 3 Bożego Ciała Street (8 Miodowa Street) – Tenement house. Designed by Karol Knaus, 1899.
- 6 Bożego Ciała Street (11 Miodowa Street) – Tenement house. Designed by Leopold Tlachna, 1896.
- 7 Bożego Ciała Street – Tenement house. Designed by Leopold Tlachna, 1893.
- 8 Bożego Ciała Street – Tenement house. Designed by Leopold Tlachna, 1893.
- 9 Bożego Ciała Street – Tenement house, 1894–1895.
- 10 Bożego Ciała Street – Tenement house. Designed by Leopold Tlachna, 1892.
- 11 Bożego Ciała Street – Tenement house, 1895–1896.
- 12 Bożego Ciała Street – Tenement house, 1890.
- 13 Bożego Ciała Street (18 Rabina Meiselsa Street) – Chewra Thilim Synagogue. Designed by Leopold Kopold, 1896.
- 14 Bożego Ciała Street – Tenement house, 1890.
- 17 Bożego Ciała Street – Tenement house. Designed by Paweł Barański, 1860–1865.
- 18–20 Bożego Ciała Street (12 Józefa Street) – Former inn, now apartments and restaurants. Until World War II, the building housed the Etz Chaim prayer house. Built in 1802.
- 19 Bożego Ciała Street (10 Józefa Street) – Tenement house created in 1861–1862 by merging and reconstructing two buildings from the 18th and 19th centuries. Currently a hotel.
- 24 Bożego Ciała Street – Building belonging to the Canons Regular convent, originally the "New School." Built in the 16th century, it has been remodeled multiple times.
- 26 Bożego Ciała Street (2 Saint Wawrzyńca Street) – Corpus Christi Basilica and the convent of the Canons Regular of the Lateran.
- 29 Bożego Ciała Street – Tenement house, 1896.
- 31 Bożego Ciała Street (6 Wolnica Square) – Tenement house. Designed by Antoni Pluszczyński, 1826.
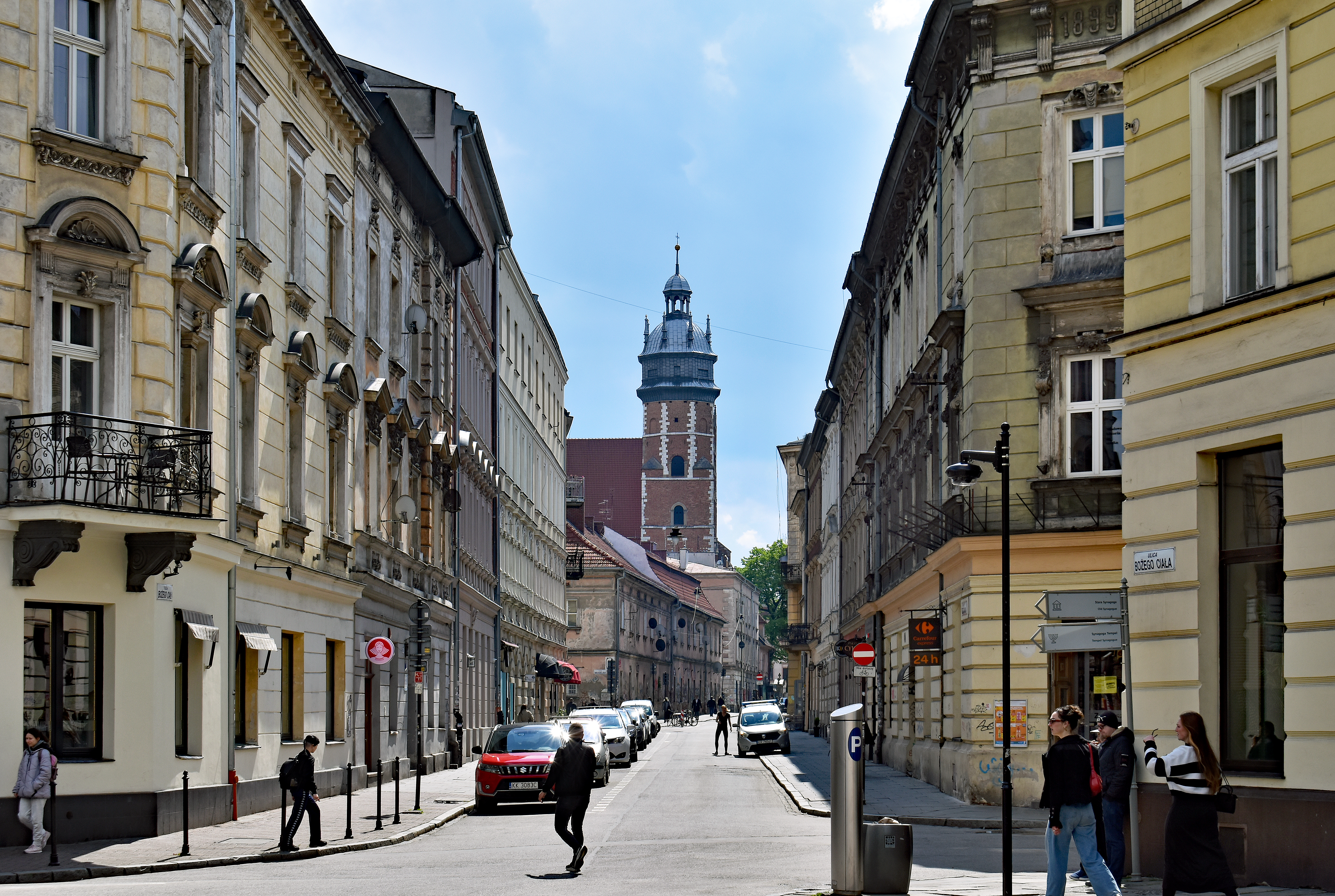
View from Miodowa Street towards Wolnica Square

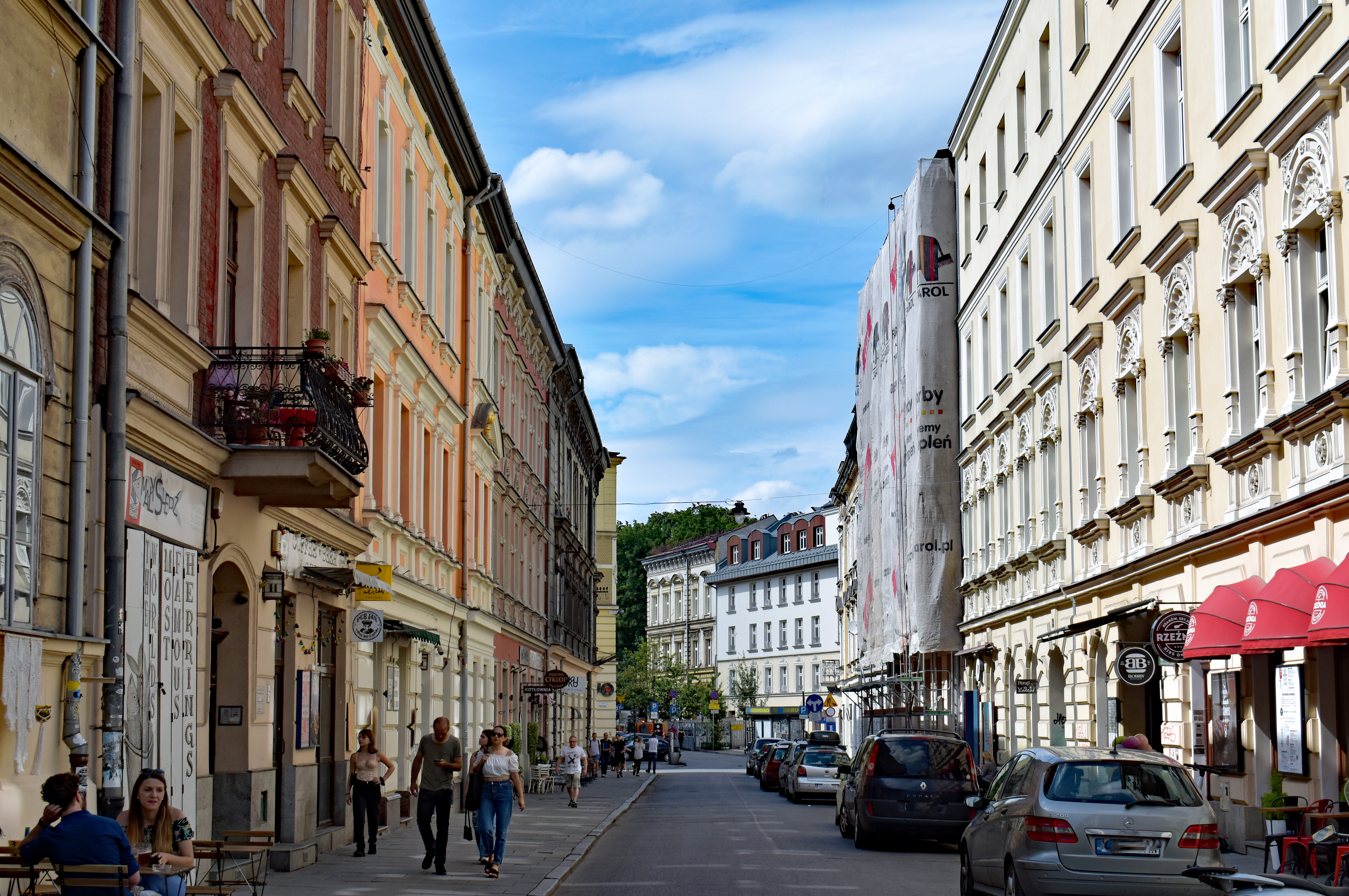
View from the intersection with Rabina Meiselsa Street to the north

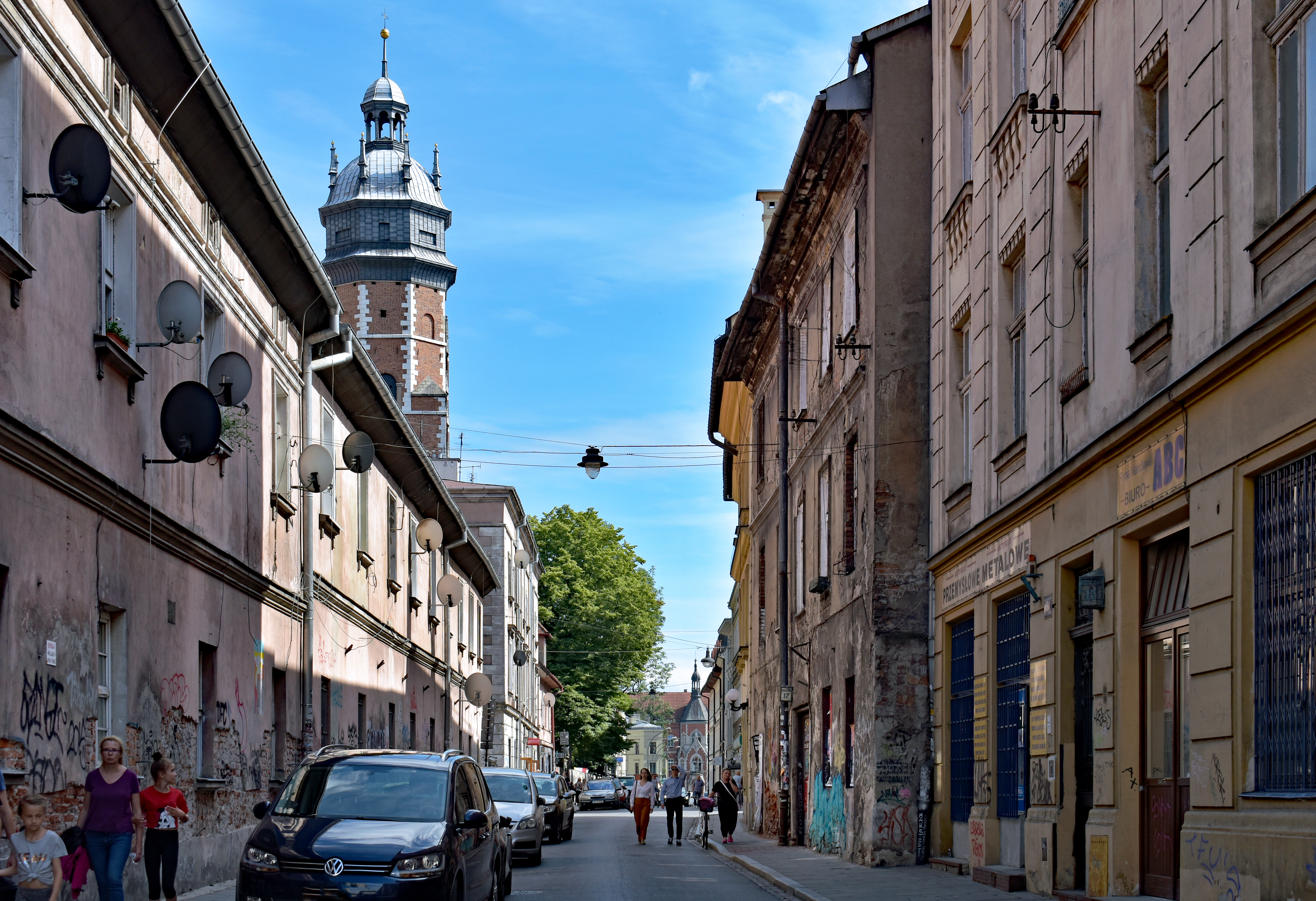
View from the intersection with Rabina Meiselsa Street to the south. On the left is the former inn, further on the tower of the Corpus Christi Church is visible. The last plan is the Hospital of the Brothers Hospitallers.

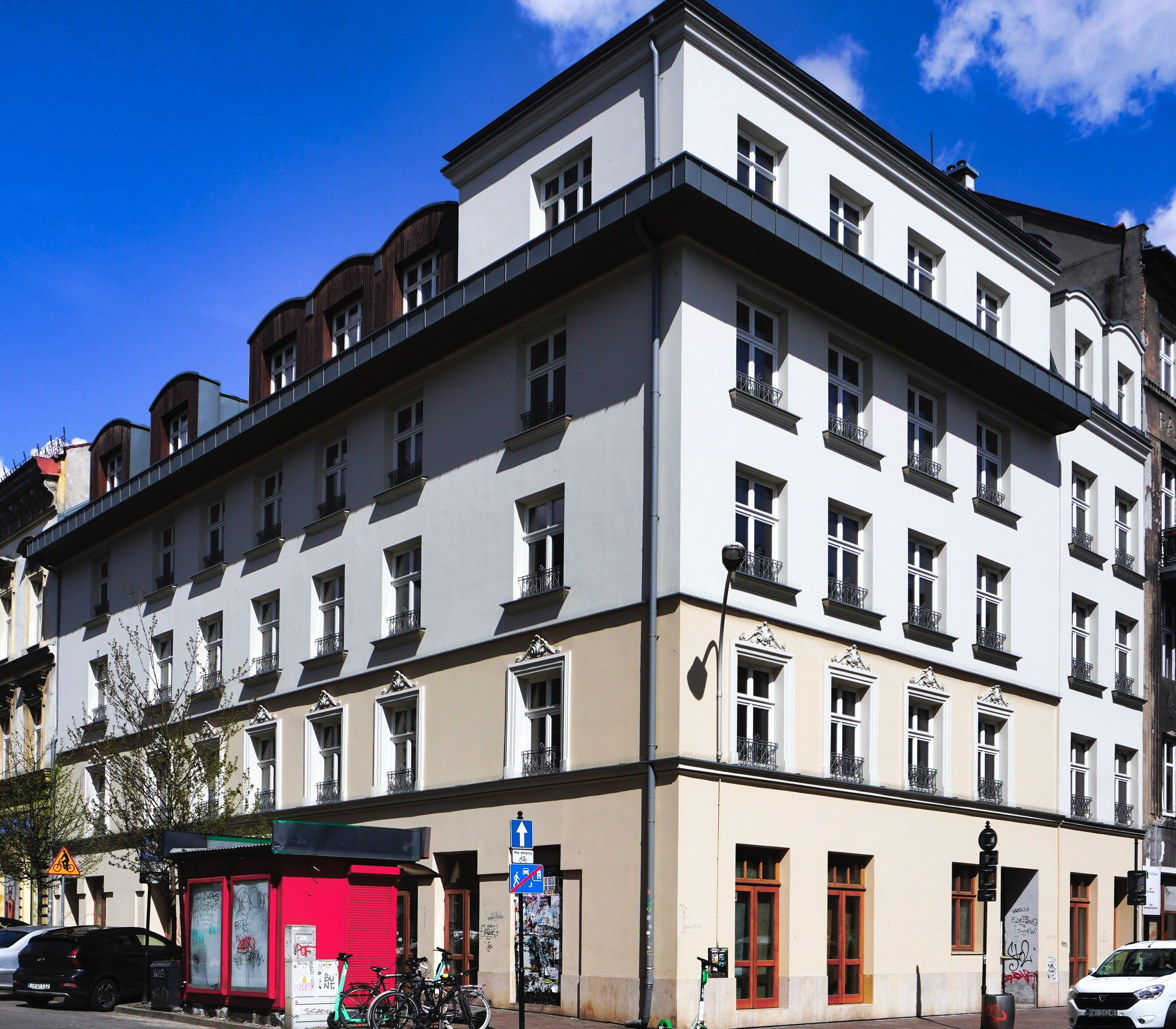
4 Bożego Ciała Street (10 Miodowa Street).
Tenement house (design. August Pluszczyński, 1835–1840, rebuilt in 2018–2019)

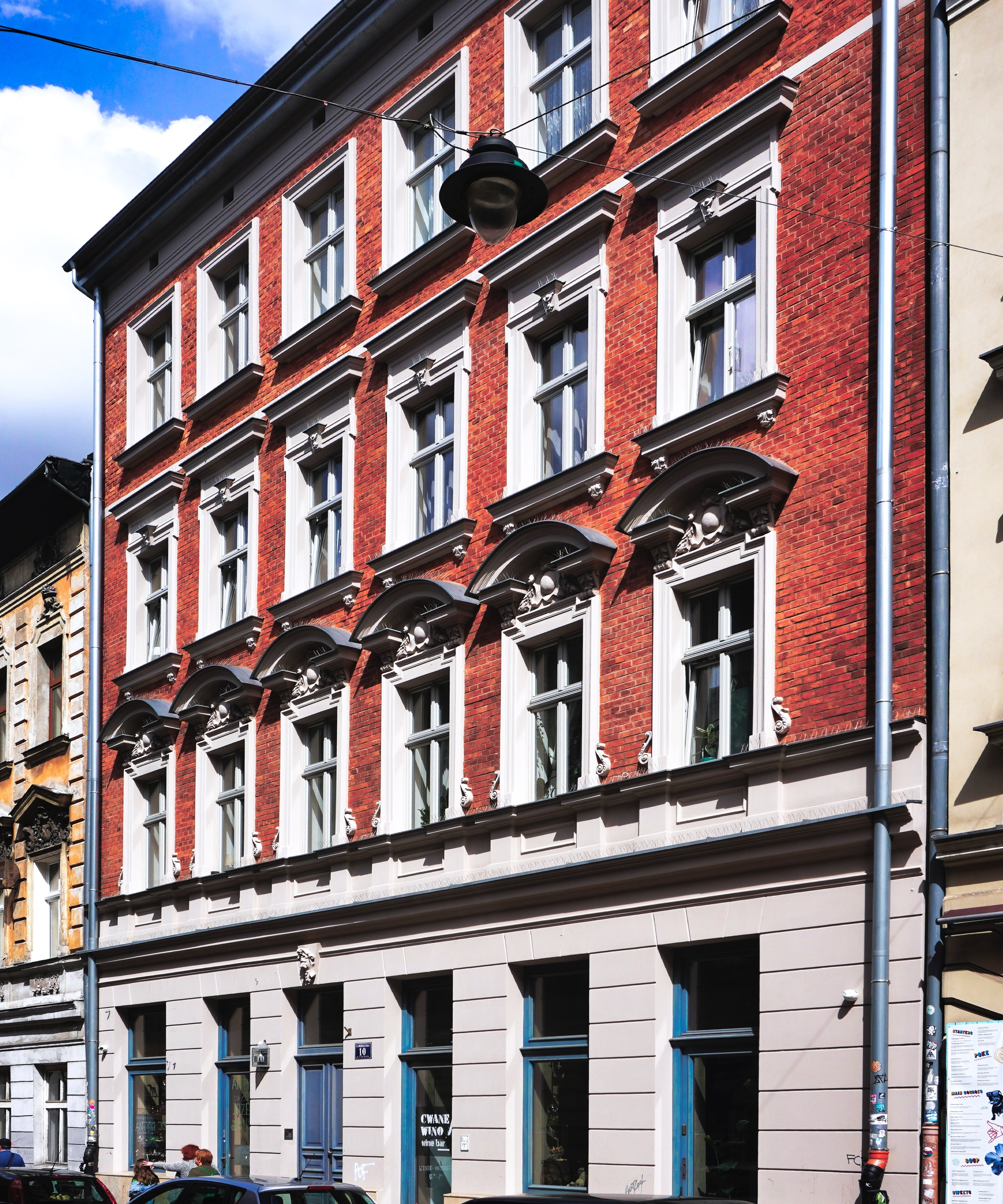
10 Bożego Ciała Street
Tenement house (design. Leopold Tlachna, 1892)

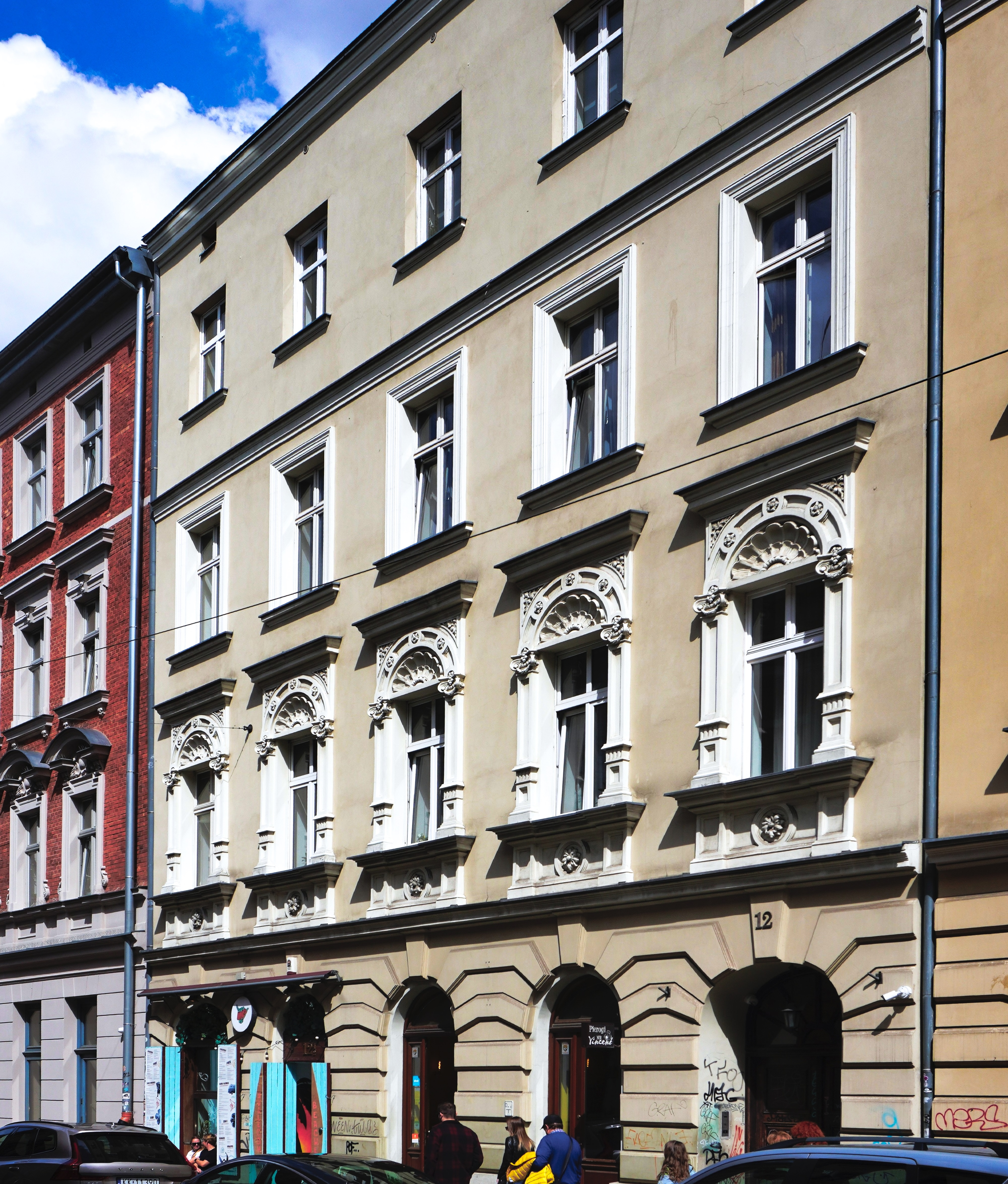
12 Bożego Ciała Street
Tenement house (1890)

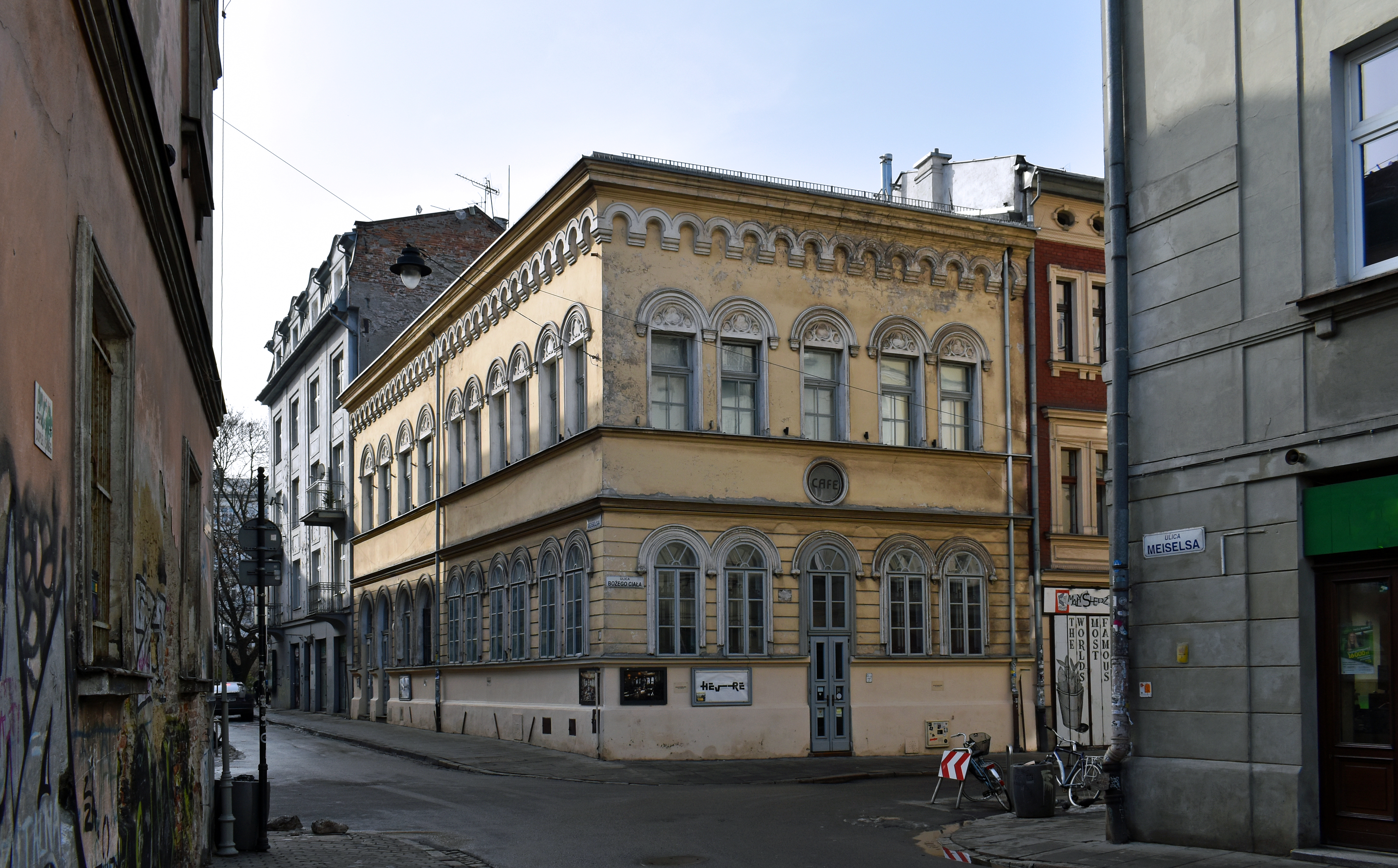
13 Bożego Ciała Street
The former Chevra Thilim synagogue

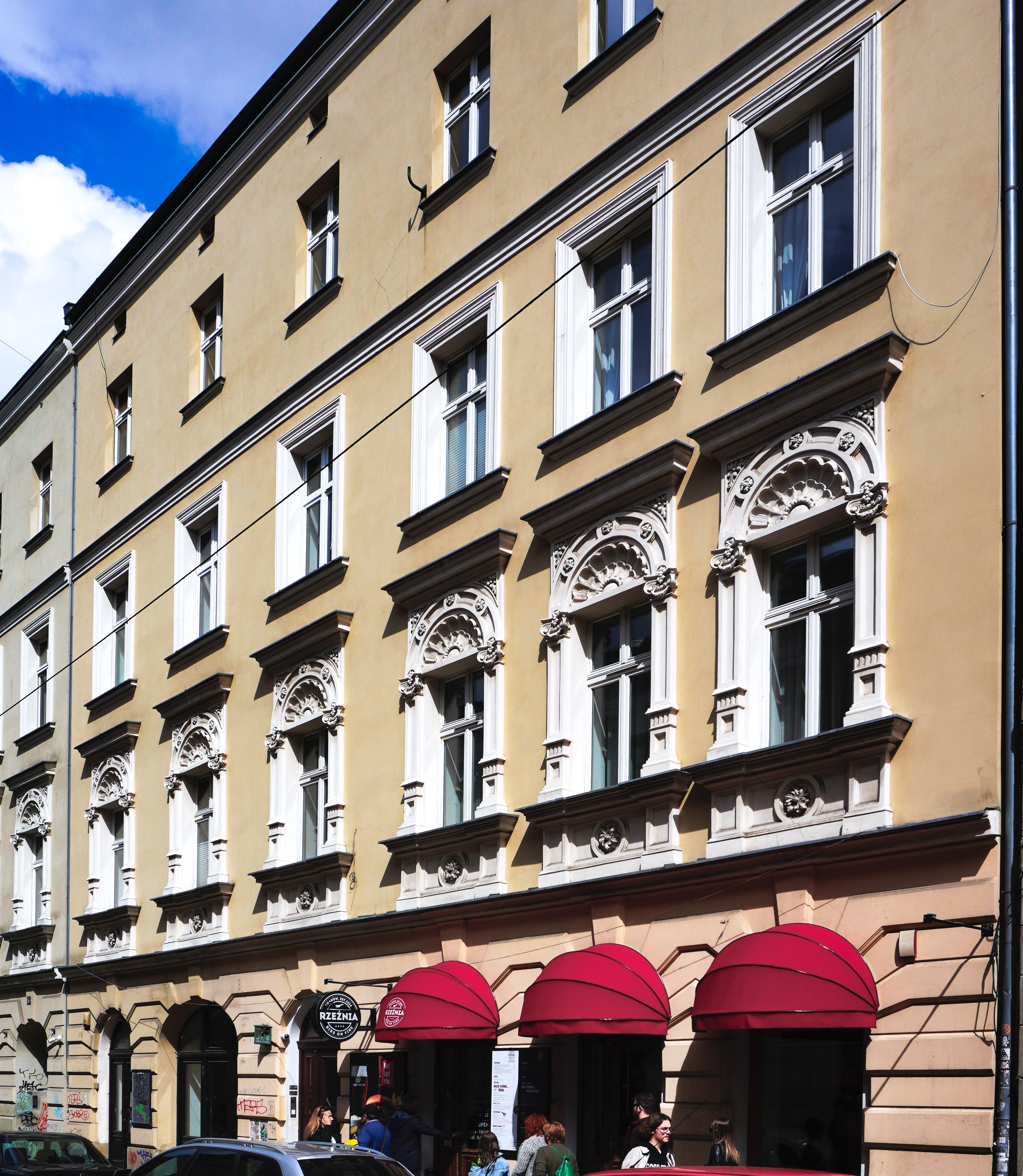
14 Bożego Ciała Street
Tenement house (1890)

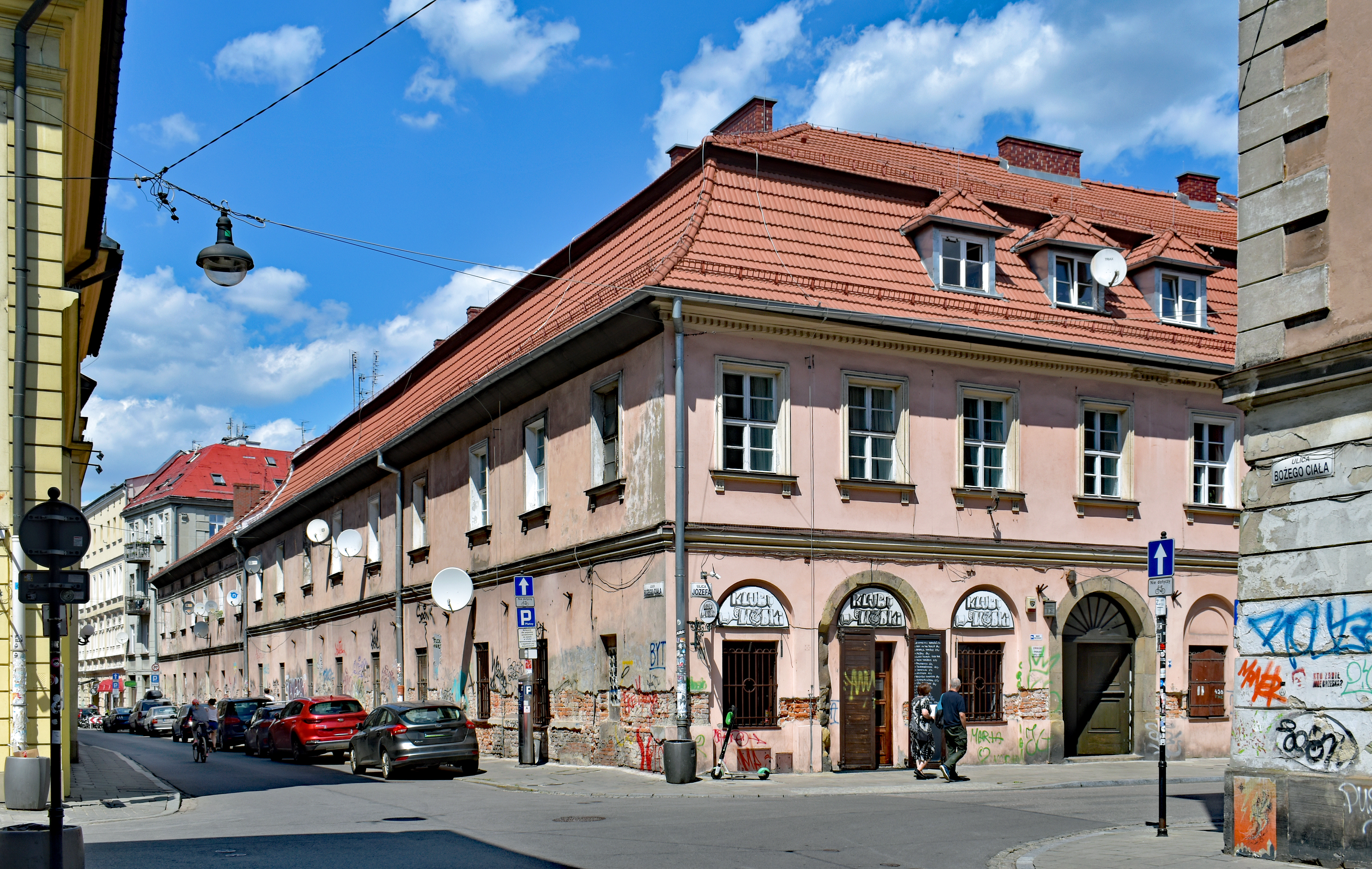
18–20 Bożego Ciała Street
The old inn

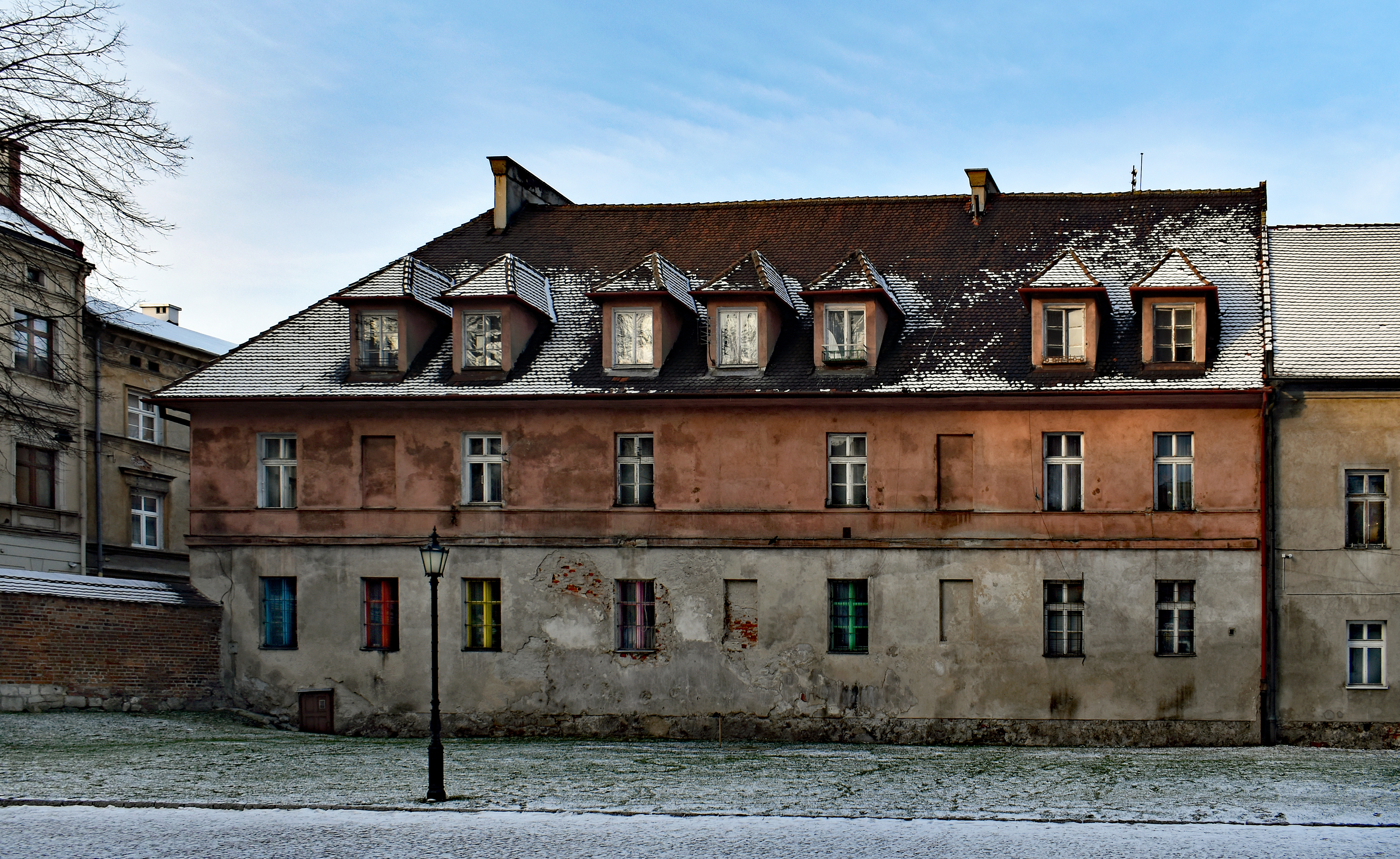
24 Bożego Ciała Street
The former "New School"

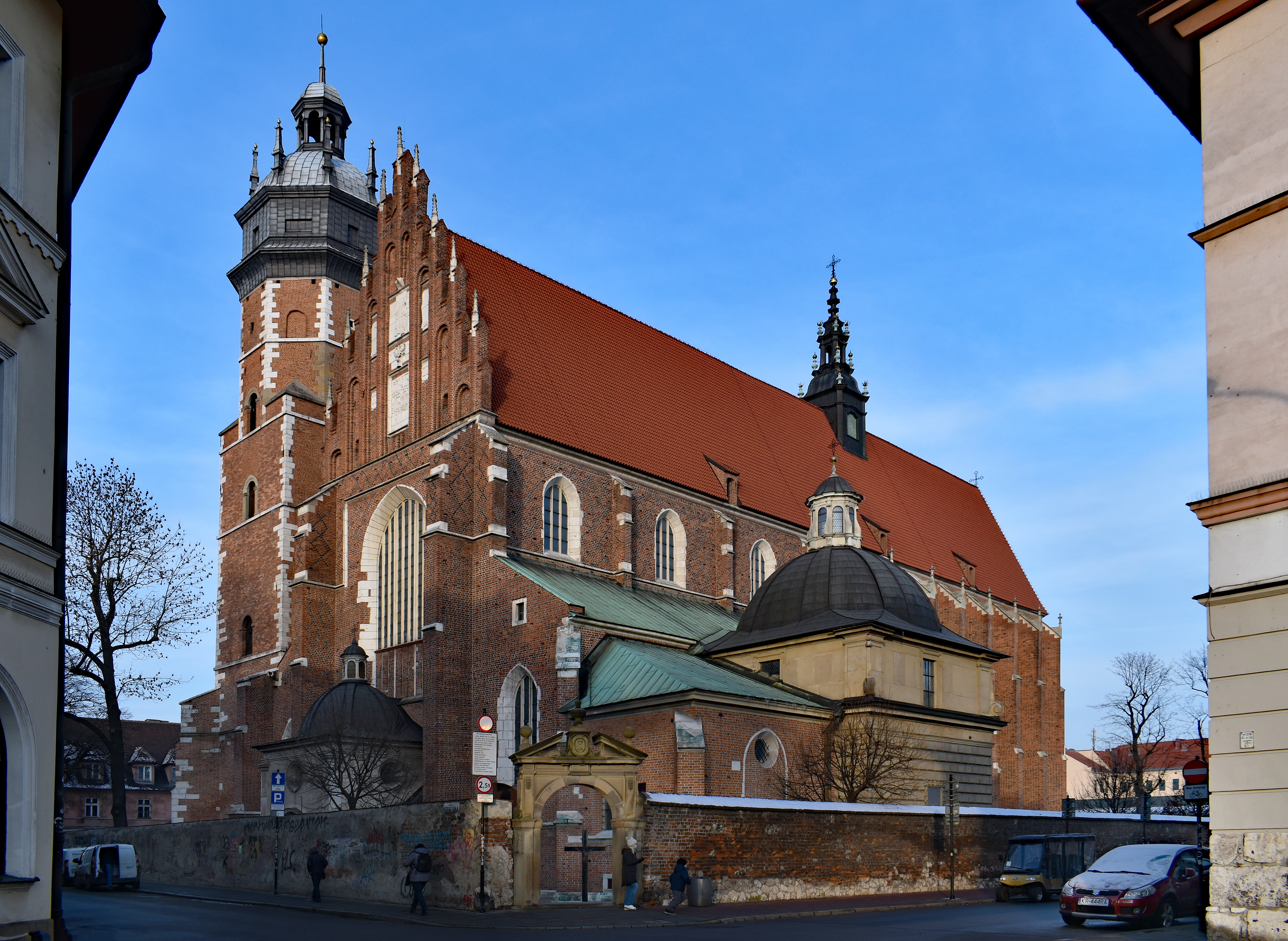
26 Bożego Ciała Street
Corpus Christi Basilica
