= Dajwór Street =

Street in Kraków, Poland

Dajwór street
Kraków
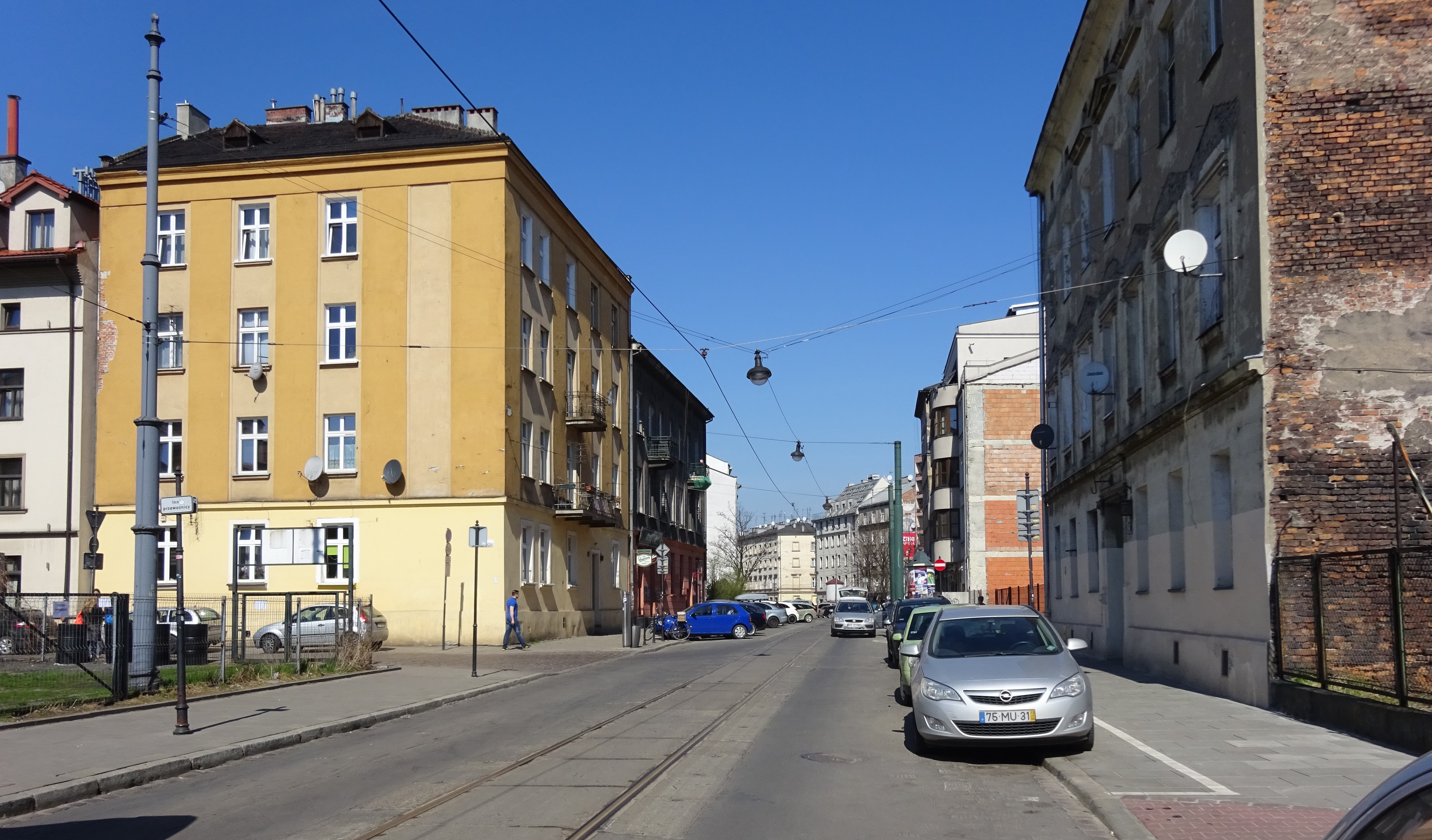
- Street view towards the north
- Interactive map of Dajwór street
- Part of: Kraków Old Town district
- Owner: City of Kraków
- Location: Kraków, Poland

Dajwór Street is a street in Kraków, located in district Old Town in Kazimierz.

It connects Starowiślna Street with Saint Wawrzyńca Street. It is a single-carriageway road.

== History ==
In the past, there was a farmstead near the street, which was leased by Marcin Dajwór in 1640. At that time, a road to the farmstead ran along the eastern walls of Kazimierz, and it was called Droga do Dajwora.

In 1620, the Popper Synagogue was built on the street. During World War II, it was devastated, and the Jewish population living on the street was relocated to the ghetto in Podgórze. After the war, the synagogue was rebuilt.

The street was laid out in its current form in the 1840s, and in the 1880s, when regulating this part of the city, the road was named Wałowa Street. However, people continued to traditionally call it Dajwór Street. Over time, the city authorities officially approved the name Dajwór Street.

In the 1890s, a brickyard known for producing high-quality roof tiles in the city was built on the street. The street also has a tram track running through it.

== Buildings ==
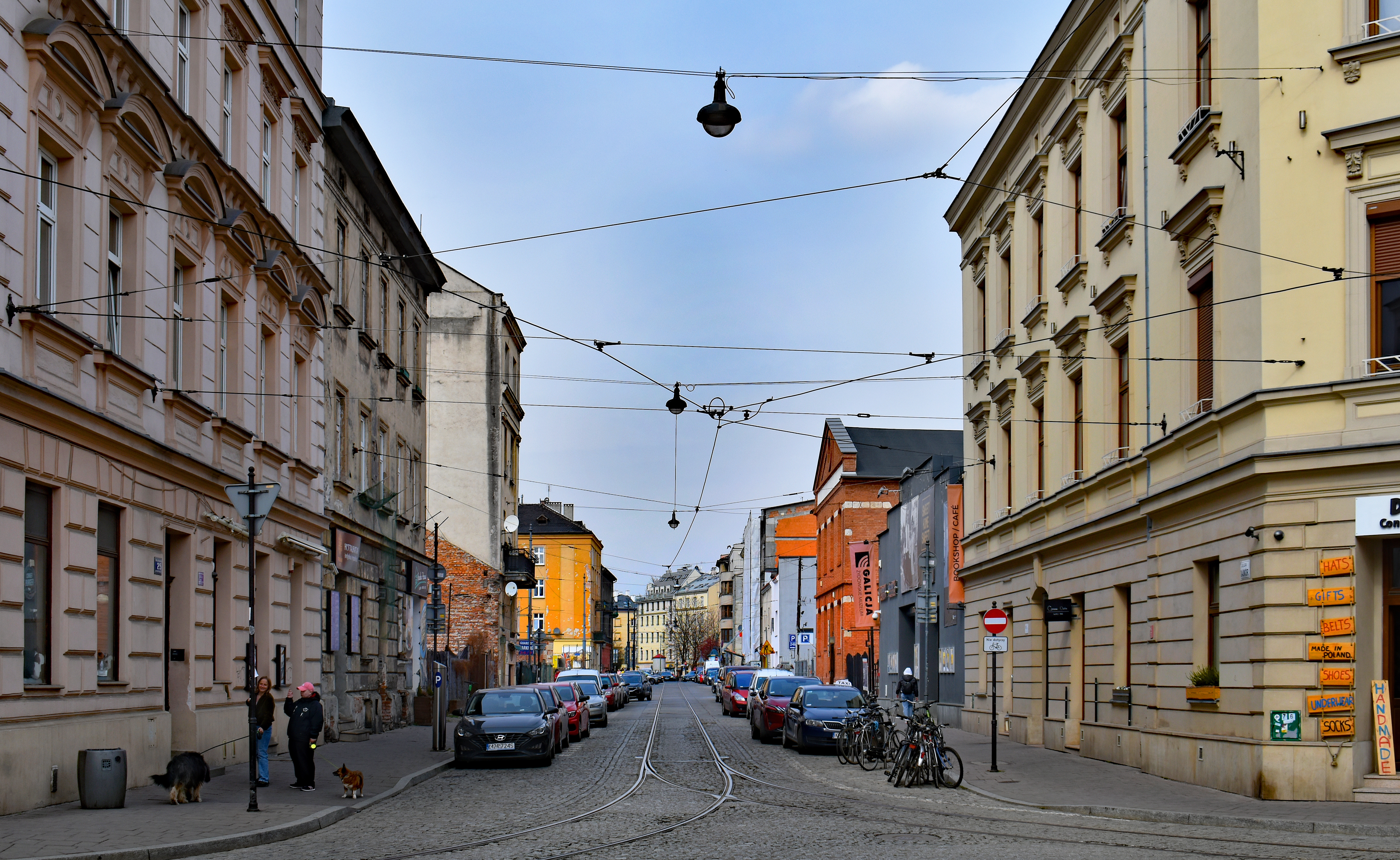
View from Saint Wawrzyńca Street

- Dajwór Street (Szeroka Street) – medieval defensive wall of Kazimierz, 1340
- 1 Dajwór Street (16 Szeroka Street) – Popper Synagogue, 1620.
- 2 Dajwór Street (77 Starowiślna Street) – tenement house. Designed by Samuel Singer, 1927.
- 3 Dajwór Street – tenement house. Designed by Abraham Abramowicz, 1924.
- 4 Dajwór Street – tenement house, 1887.
- 5 Dajwór Street – tenement house. Designed by Zygmunt Prokesz, 1927.
- 6 Dajwór Street – tenement house, 1890.
- 10 Dajwór Street – factory hall of the "Molitor" machinery plant, 20th century.
- 14–16 Dajwór Street 14–16 – tenement house, 1910.
- 18 Dajwór Street – building, 1931.
- 19 Dajwór Street – tenement house. Designed by Zygmunt Prokesz, 1924.
- 20 Dajwór Street (24 Saint Wawrzyńca Street) – tenement house, 19th century.
- 23 Dajwór Street – tenement house, 1900.
- 25 Dajwór Street (22 Saint Wawrzyńca Street) – tenement house, 19th century.
- 27 Dajwór Street (19–25 Saint Wawrzyńca Street) – municipal power plant. Designed by Jan Rzymkowski and Franciszek Mączyński, 1904–1908.
