= Bartosza Street =

Street in Kraków, Poland

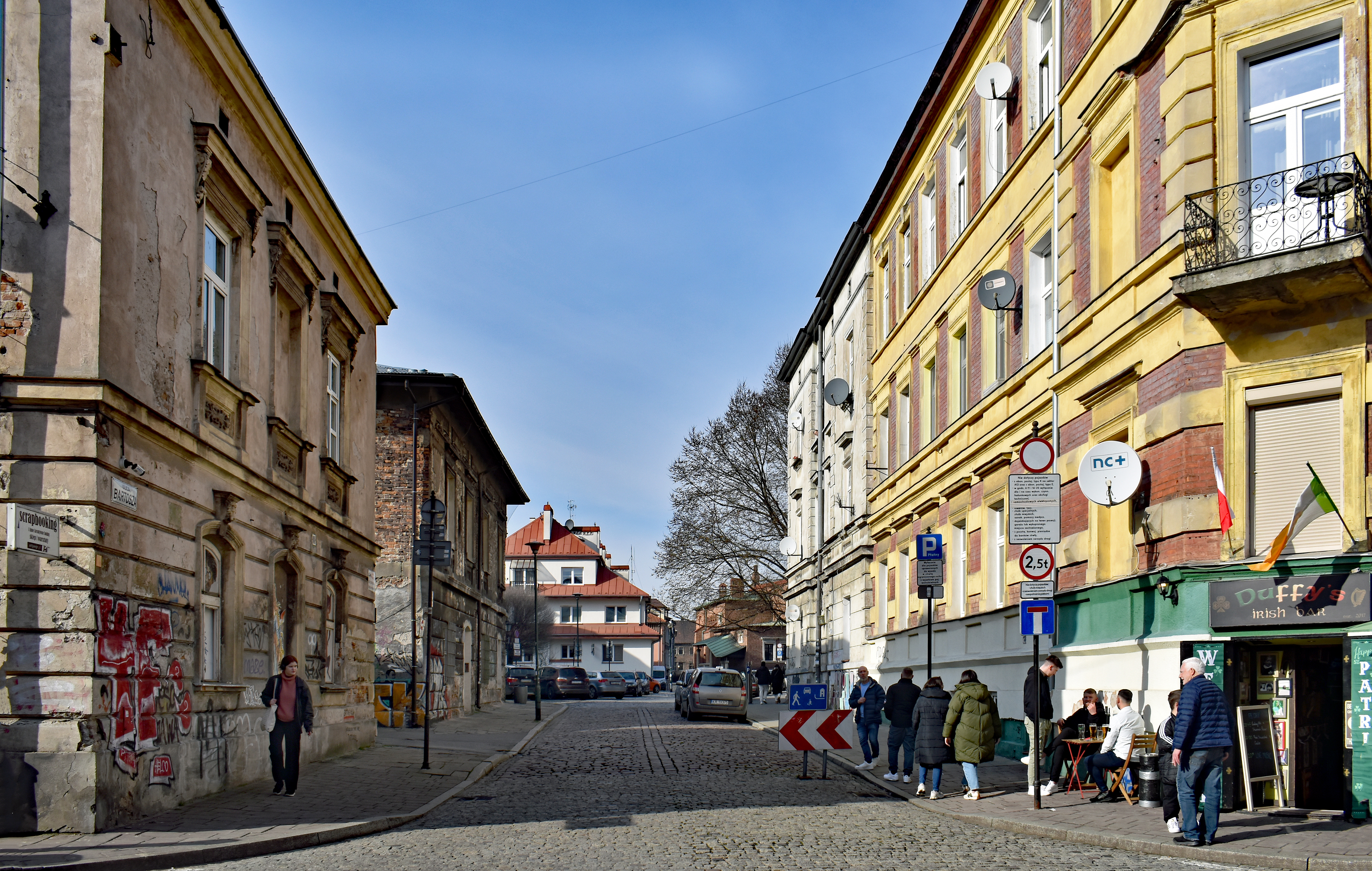
- View from Saint Wawrzyńca Street, then Bawół Square and the exit of Szeroka Street
- Interactive map of Bartosza Street
- Part of: Old Town district
- Owner: City of Kraków
- Location: Kraków, Poland

UNESCO World Heritage Site
- Type: Cultural
- Criteria: iv
- Designated: 1978
- Part of: Historic Centre of Kraków
- Reference no.: 29
- Region: Europe and North America

Historic Monument of Poland
- Designated: 1994-09-08
- Part of: Kraków historical city complex
- Reference no.: M.P. 1994 nr 50 poz. 418

Bartosza Street a historic street in Kazimierz, the former district of Kraków, Poland.

It connects Szeroka Street and Bawół Square with Saint Wawrzyńca Street. It is a single-carriageway road.

== History ==
The street existed as early as the 18th century as an unnamed alley. It assumed its current form between 1871 and 1883. In the 1880s, it was called Wysoka Street, and in 1890, the Kraków City Council gave the street its current name.

At that time, it was also proposed to name the street Głucha Street, but this proposal was not accepted by the City Council.

It is one of two streets in Krakow commemorating Wojciech Bartos Głowacki, a scythe-bearer from the Kościuszko Uprising who fought in the Battle of Racławice.

== Buildings ==
- 1 Bartosza Street (Bawół Square) – a house, built in 1878.
- 2 Bartosza Street (Bawół Square) – a tenement house, designed by Leopold Tlachna, 1888–1889.
- 3 Bartosza Street (16 Saint Wawrzyńca Street) – a house, designed by Nacham Kopald, 1877.
- 4 Bartosza Street (18 Saint Wawrzyńca Street) – a tenement house, designed by Beniamin Torbe, 1888–1889.
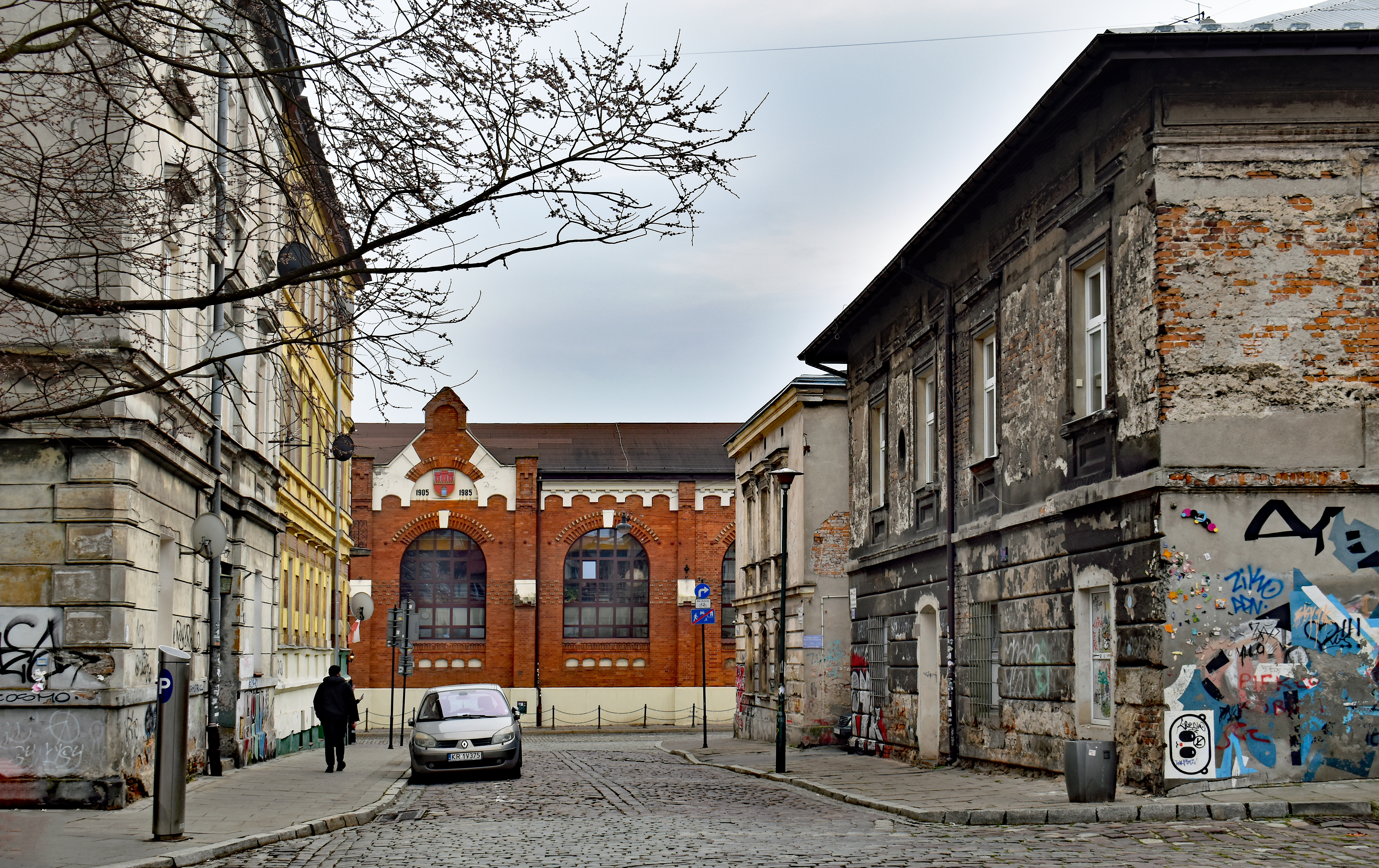
View from the north, from Bawół Square. The perspective is closed by the building of the old Kraków Power Plant at Saint Wawrzyńca Street
