= Corpus Christi Church, Kraków =

Roman Catholic church in Kraków, Poland

Corpus Christi Church
- Kościół Bożego Ciała
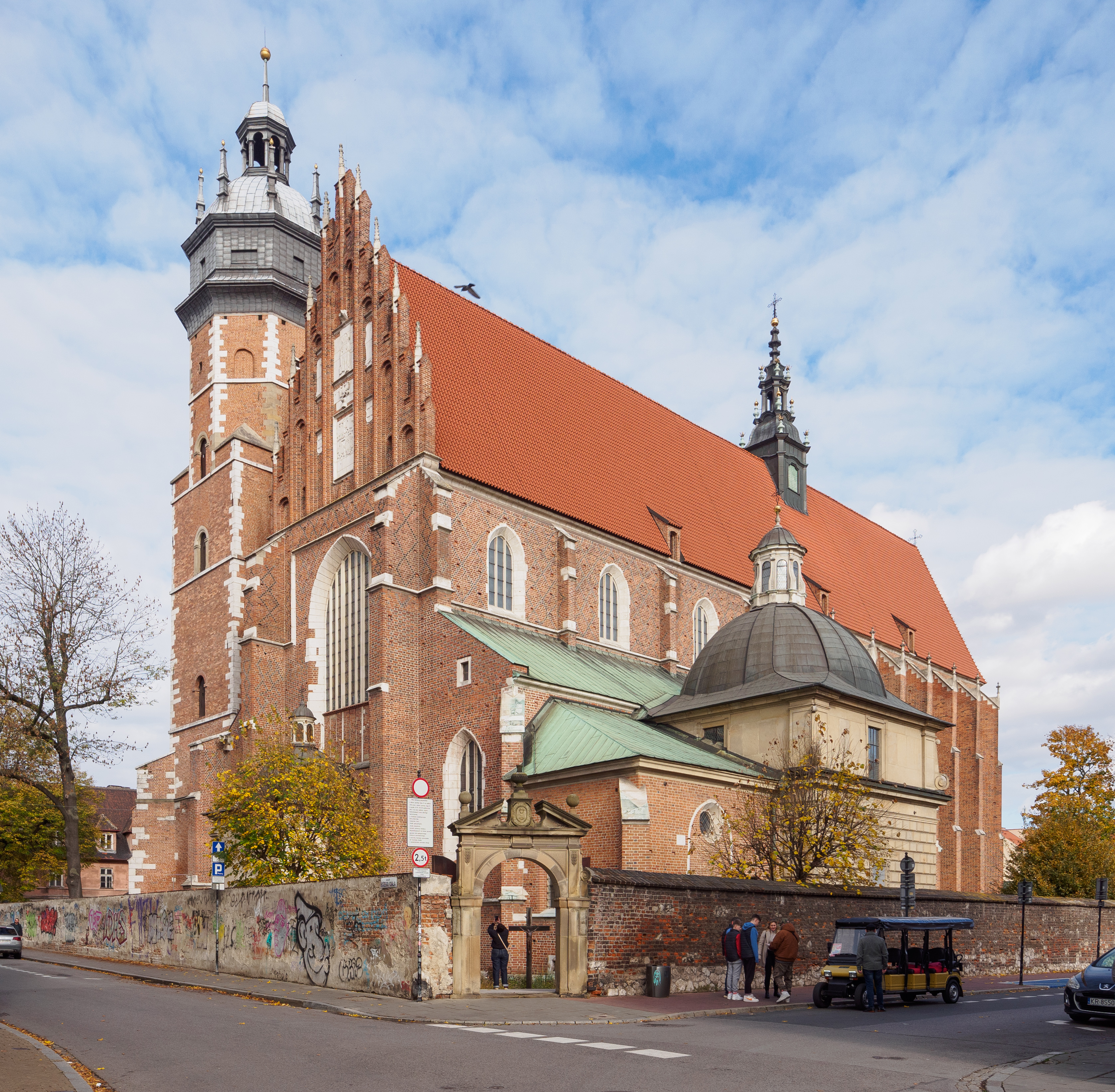
- Corpus Christi Church
- 50°02′59.3″N 19°56′41.7″E
- Location: Kraków
- Address: 26 Bożego Ciała Street
- Country: Poland
- Denomination: Roman Catholic

UNESCO World Heritage Site
- Type: Cultural
- Criteria: iv
- Designated: 1978
- Part of: Historic Centre of Kraków
- Reference no.: 29
- Region: Europe and North America

Historic Monument of Poland
- Designated: 1994-09-08
- Part of: Kazimierz
- Reference no.: M.P. 1994 nr 50 poz. 418

The Corpus Christi Church (Polish: Kościół Bożego Ciała), is a historic Roman Catholic parish and conventual church of the Canons Regular of the Lateran located at 26 Bożego Ciała Street in Kazimierz, the former district of Kraków, Poland.

== History ==
The a Gothic church was founded by King Casimir III the Great in 1335.The basilica was erected in stages beginning in 1340 until about the mid-15th century. It was intended as a monastery church, which explains the large plot of land on which it stands, and the presence of a monastic cemetery next to it. In 1404 King Władysław II Jagiełło gave it to the Canons Regular of the Lateran, a congregation which he had brought in from Kłodzko.

== Interior ==
The interior of the church is a mixture of Polish Gothic and impressive Polish Baroque architecture with structural features such as a large gilded Baroque high altar, a boat-shaped pulpit (1750), and the organ. The church was robbed clean and the interior utterly devastated by soldiers of the 1655 Swedish invasion (the Deluge), which explains the prevalence of Baroque in its current decoration. The church is said to contain one of the most beautiful Baroque choir stalls in Central Europe. Bartolommeo Berrecci, the Renaissance artist who designed Sigismund's Chapel at Wawel, is buried there.

Corpus Christi Basilica houses the largest organs in Krakow. The main instrument was built between 1958 and 1963 using some elements of the old organ dating back to the 1770s. It was designed for 83 pitches and consists of two parts. The main organ placed on the choir and side organs located in the chancel. The organs have a total of 5950 pipes and 25 bells. They have the ability to play works written on an echo basis. The sound of organs 70 meters away from each other gives the listener a unique experience.

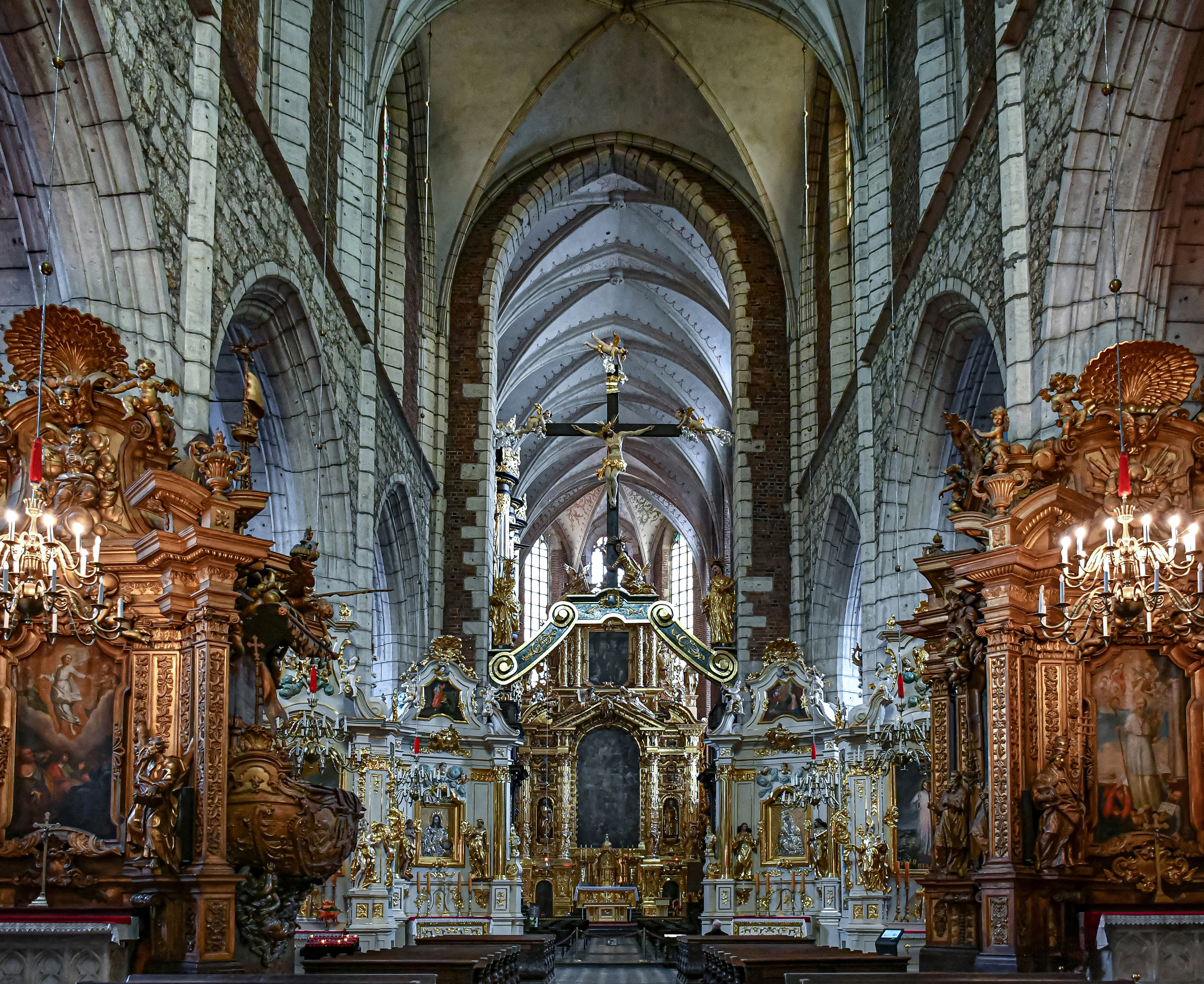
Main nave
