= Saint Wawrzyńca Street =

Street in Kraków, Poland

Saint Wawrzyńca street
Kraków
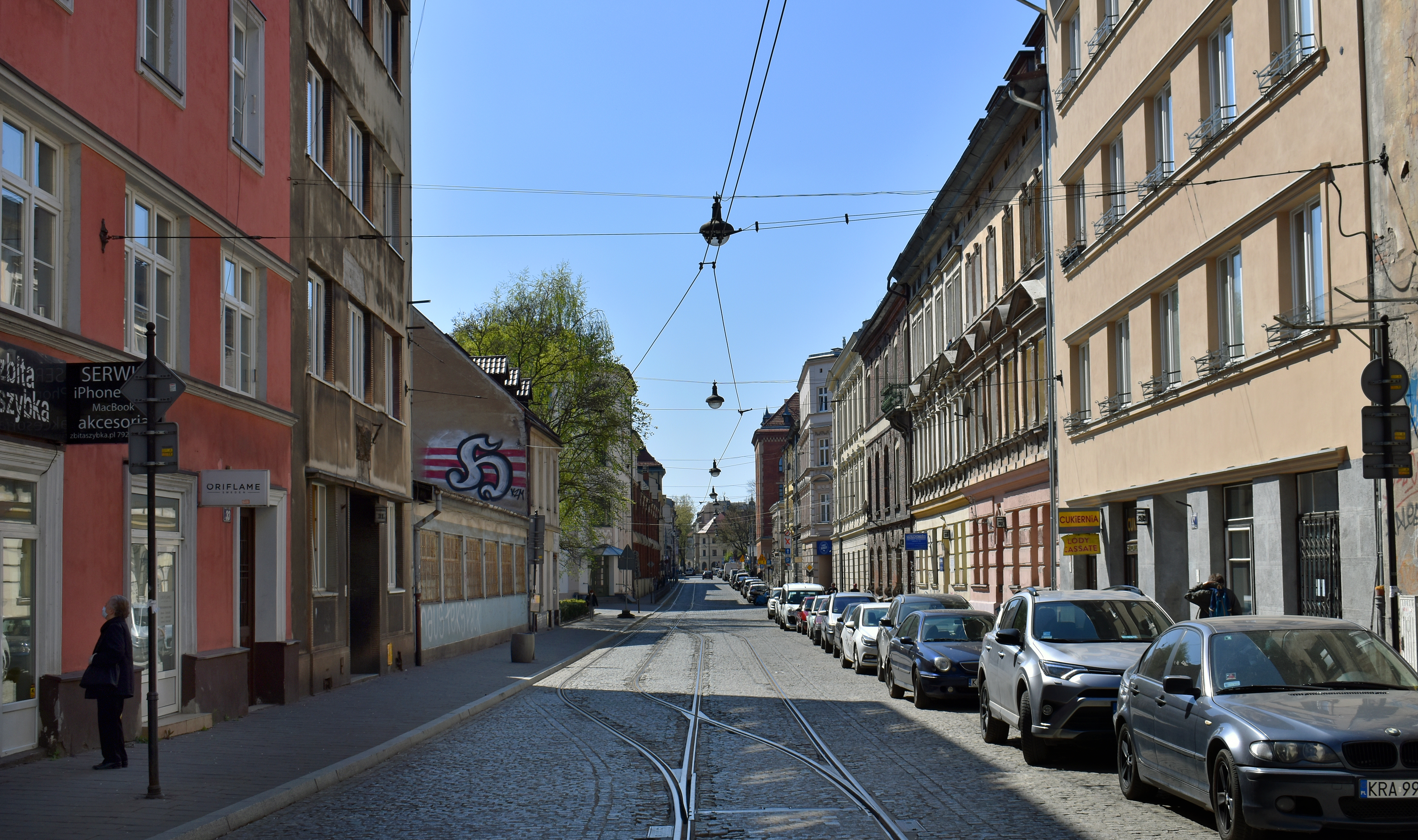
- View from Starowiślna Street to the west
- Interactive map of Saint Wawrzyńca street
- Part of: Kraków Old Town district
- Owner: City of Kraków
- Location: Kraków, Poland

Saint Wawrzyńca Street is a street in Kraków, located in district Old Town in Kazimierz.

== History ==
Laid out as part of Kazimierz's town plan in 1335.

Initially called Wawrzyniecka, the current name has been in use since the 19th century and derives from the former Church of St. Lawrence that once stood on the street. Most of the original buildings on the street were destroyed at the turn of the 17th and 18th centuries. In 1875, the construction of tenement houses began. In 1882, a tram depot was built on the street, and since 1998, the building has housed the Museum of Engineering and Technology. A tram line runs along the street between the museum and Starowiślna Street.

Between 1904 and 1905, a municipal power plant was built at 25 Saint Wawrzyńca Street, which today serves as an example of early 20th-century industrial architecture.

At the corner of Saint Wawrzyńca Street and Bożego Ciała Street stands the Corpus Christi Basilica, and at the corner with Wąska Street is the building of a former Jewish school (now housing the Adam Mickiewicz VI High School).

== Buildings ==
- 5 Saint Wawrzyńca Street – tenement house, 1911.
- 7 Saint Wawrzyńca Street – tenement house, designed by Leopold Tlachna, 1891.
- 9 Saint Wawrzyńca Street – tenement house, designed by Leopold Tlachna, 1891.
- 11 Saint Wawrzyńca Street (1 Gazowa Street) – tenement house, designed by Nachman Kopald, 1907.
- 20 Saint Wawrzyńca Street – tenement house, designed by Beniamin Torbe, 1888.
- 27 Saint Wawrzyńca Street – tenement house, designed by Samuel Singer, 1924.
- 28 Saint Wawrzyńca Street – tenement house, 1892.
- 30 Saint Wawrzyńca Street – tenement house, designed by Adam Dębski, 1894.
- 31b Saint Wawrzyńca Street – tenement house, designed by Leon Lieberman, 1937.
- 32 Saint Wawrzyńca Street – tenement house, designed by Zygmunt Prokesz, 1932.
- 33 Saint Wawrzyńca Street – tenement house, designed by Izydor Goldberger, 1930.
- 38 Saint Wawrzyńca Street – tenement house, designed by Leon Lieberman, 1937.
- 39 Saint Wawrzyńca Street – tenement house, designed by Rudolf Morgenbesser and Izydor Goldberger, 1935.
- 41 Saint Wawrzyńca Street – tenement house, designed by Henryk Ritterman, 1931.
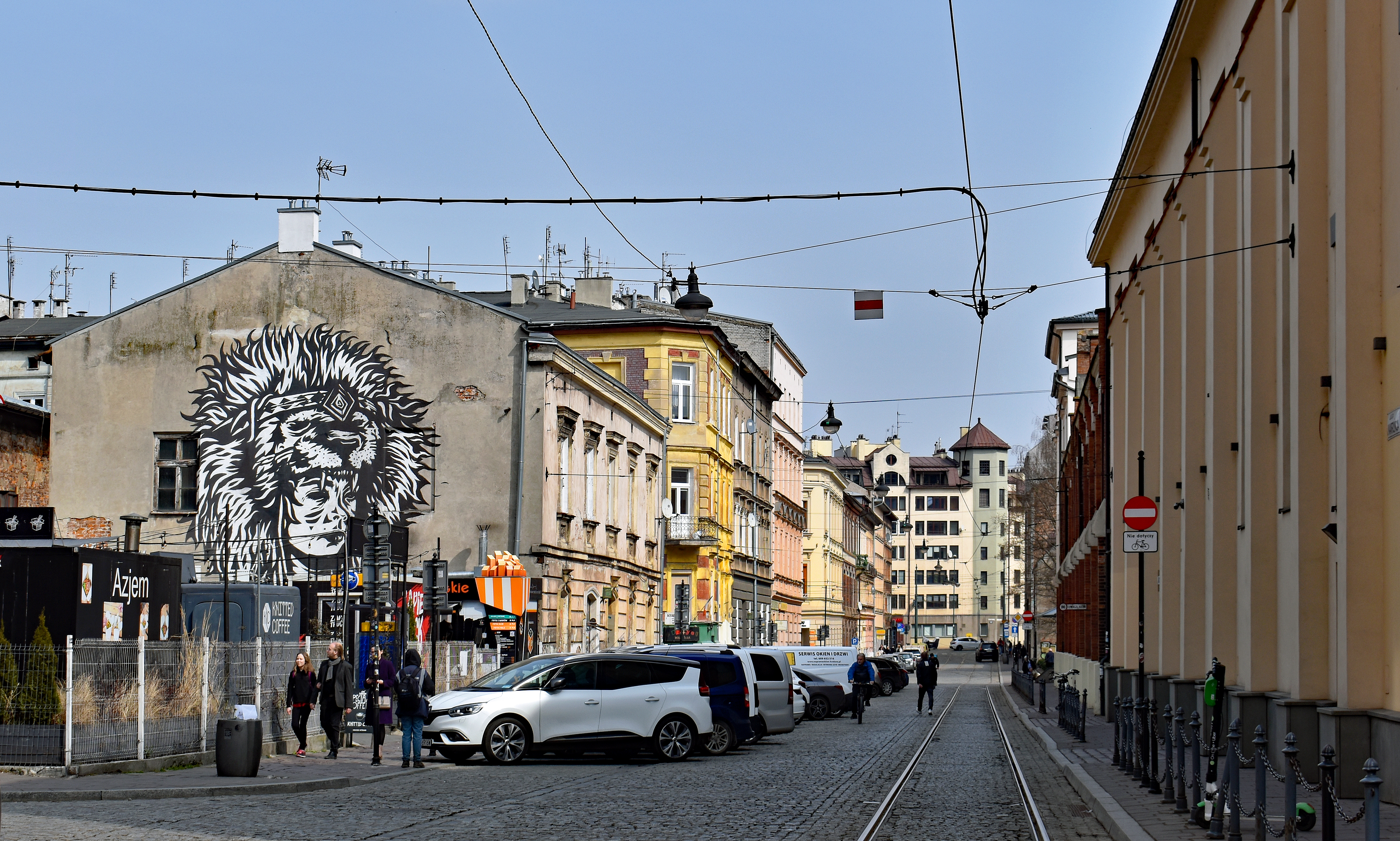
View from Wąska Street to the east

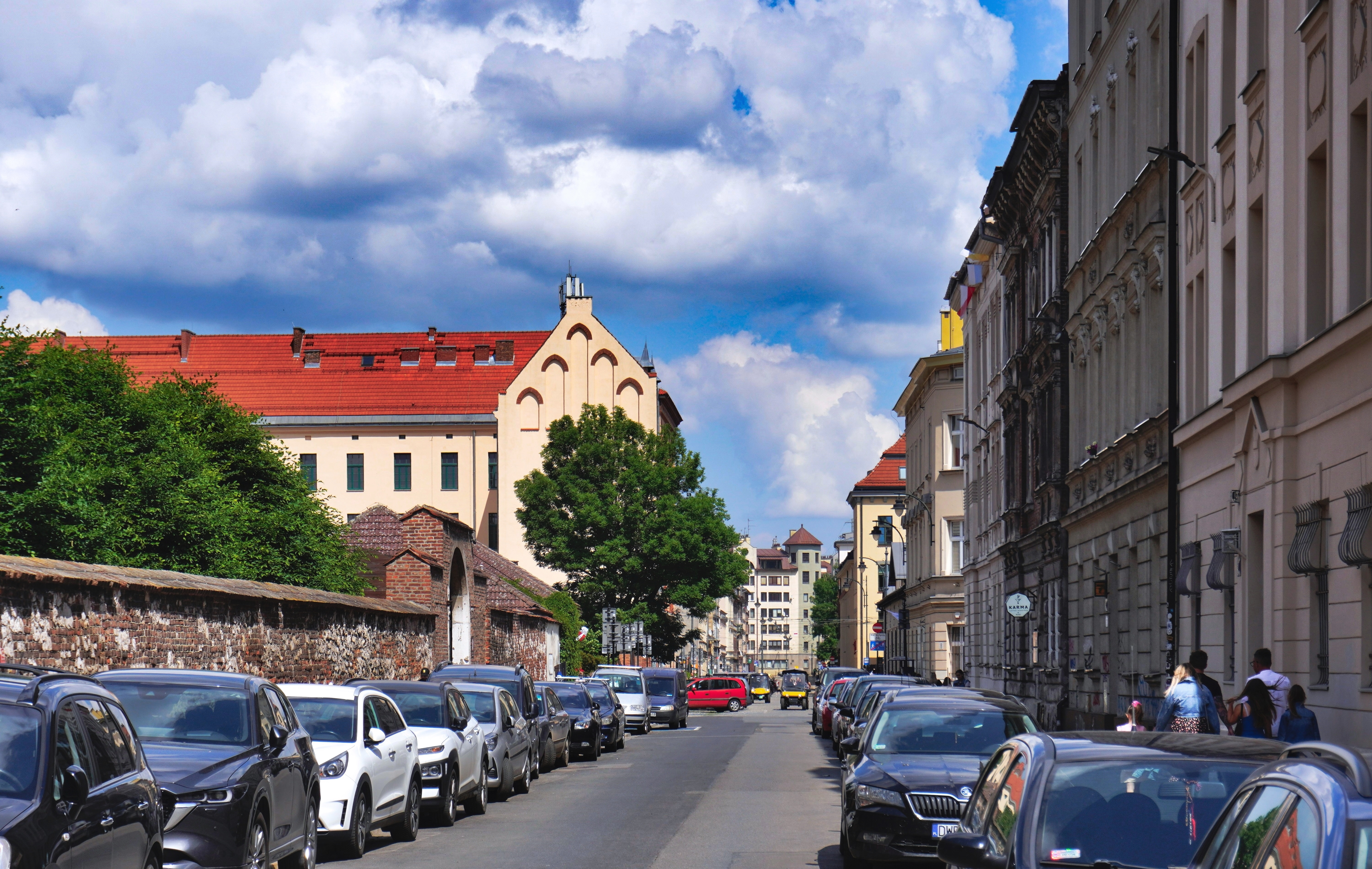
View from Wolnica Square to the east

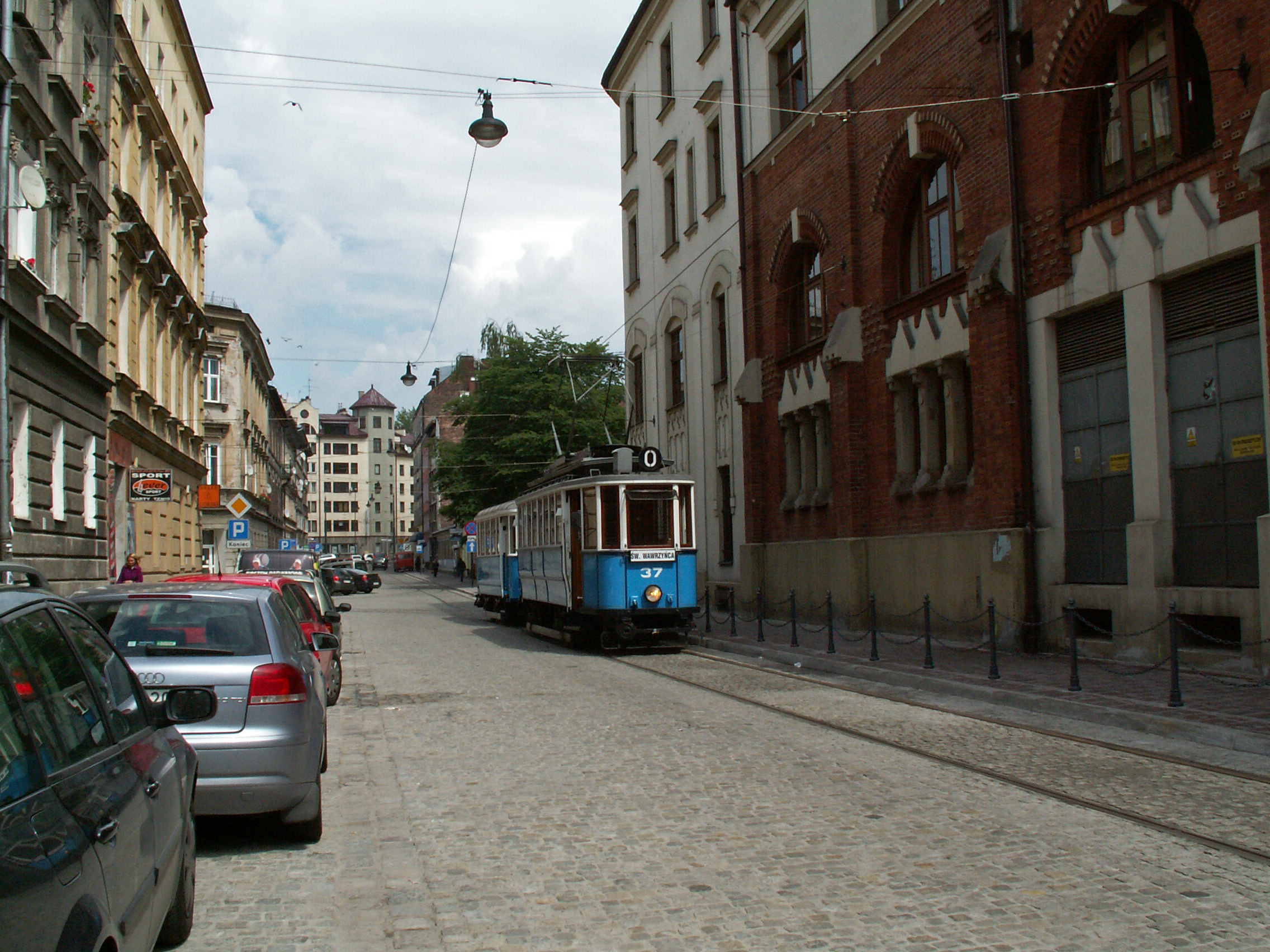
Tram line 0 arriving at the depot

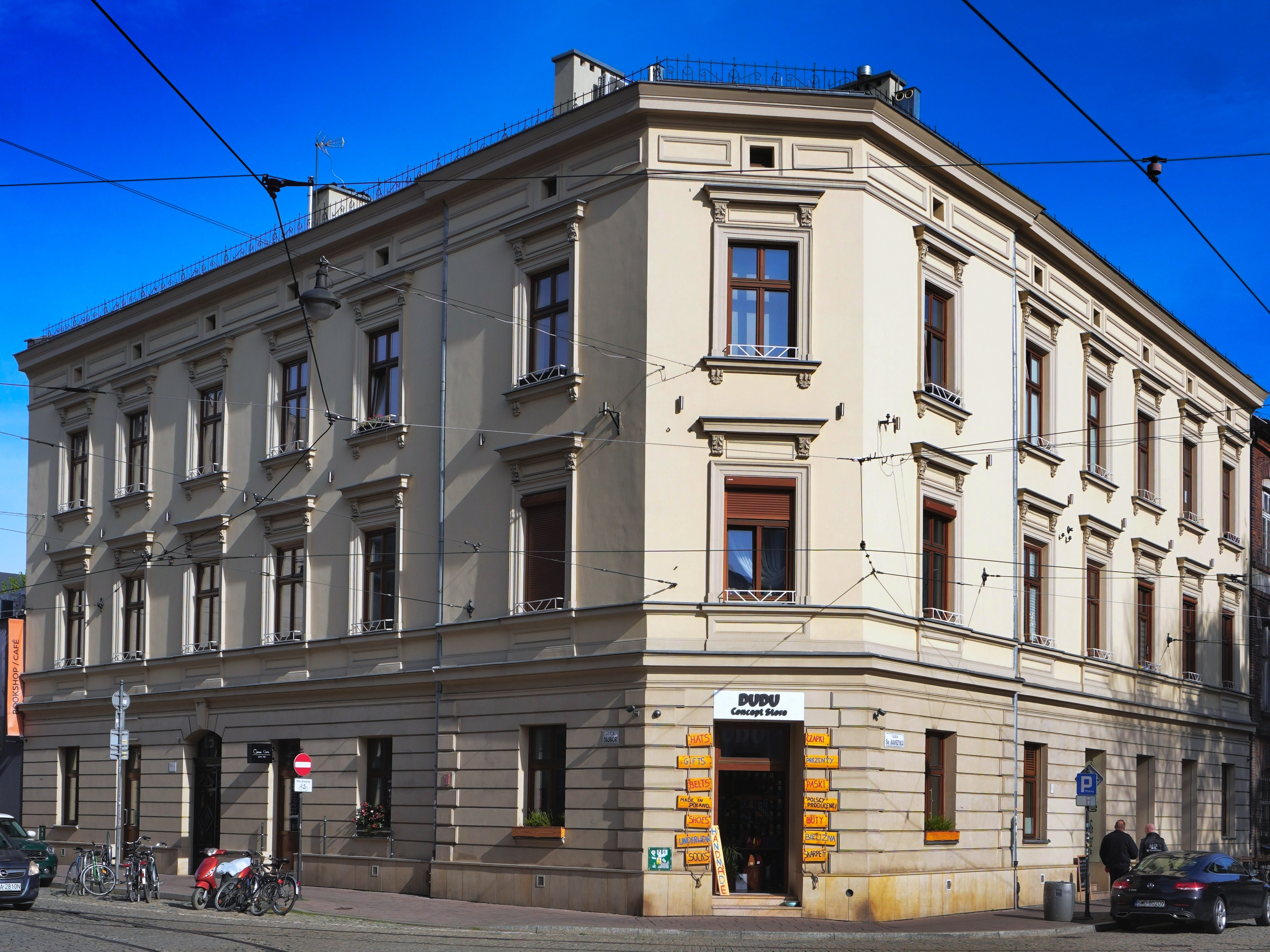
30 Saint Wawrzyńca Street
Tenement house (19th century)
