= Alvis Car and Engineering Company =

British manufacturing company in Coventry, England

Alvis Car and Engineering Company Ltd
- Type: Private company
- Industry: Automotive industry
- Founded: 1919
- Founder: Thomas George John
- Defunct: 1967
- Successor: Rover Company
- Headquarters: Coventry, England
- Number of locations: Production; Coventry, England
- Area served: Worldwide
- Key people: Thomas George John Chairman and managing director, 1919–1944; Geoffrey de Freville; John Joseph Parkes Chairman and managing director, 1946–1973; George Thomas Smith-Clarke Chief engineer and general manager, 1922–1950; William M. Dunn Chief engineer, vehicle division, 1922–1959; A. F. Varney Chief Engineer, aero engine division, 1922–1972
- Products: Automobiles, military vehicles, aircraft engines
- Website: www.thealviscarcompany.co.uk

Alvis Car and Engineering Company Ltd was a British manufacturing company in Coventry from 1919 to 1967. In addition to automobiles designed for the civilian market, the company also produced racing cars, aircraft engines, armoured cars, and other armoured fighting vehicles.

Car manufacturing ended after the company became a subsidiary of Rover in 1965, but armoured vehicle manufacture continued. Alvis became part of British Leyland and then, in 1982, was sold to United Scientific Holdings, which renamed itself Alvis plc.

In 2023, its successor company began manufacturing the brand’s classic models again.

== History of the company ==
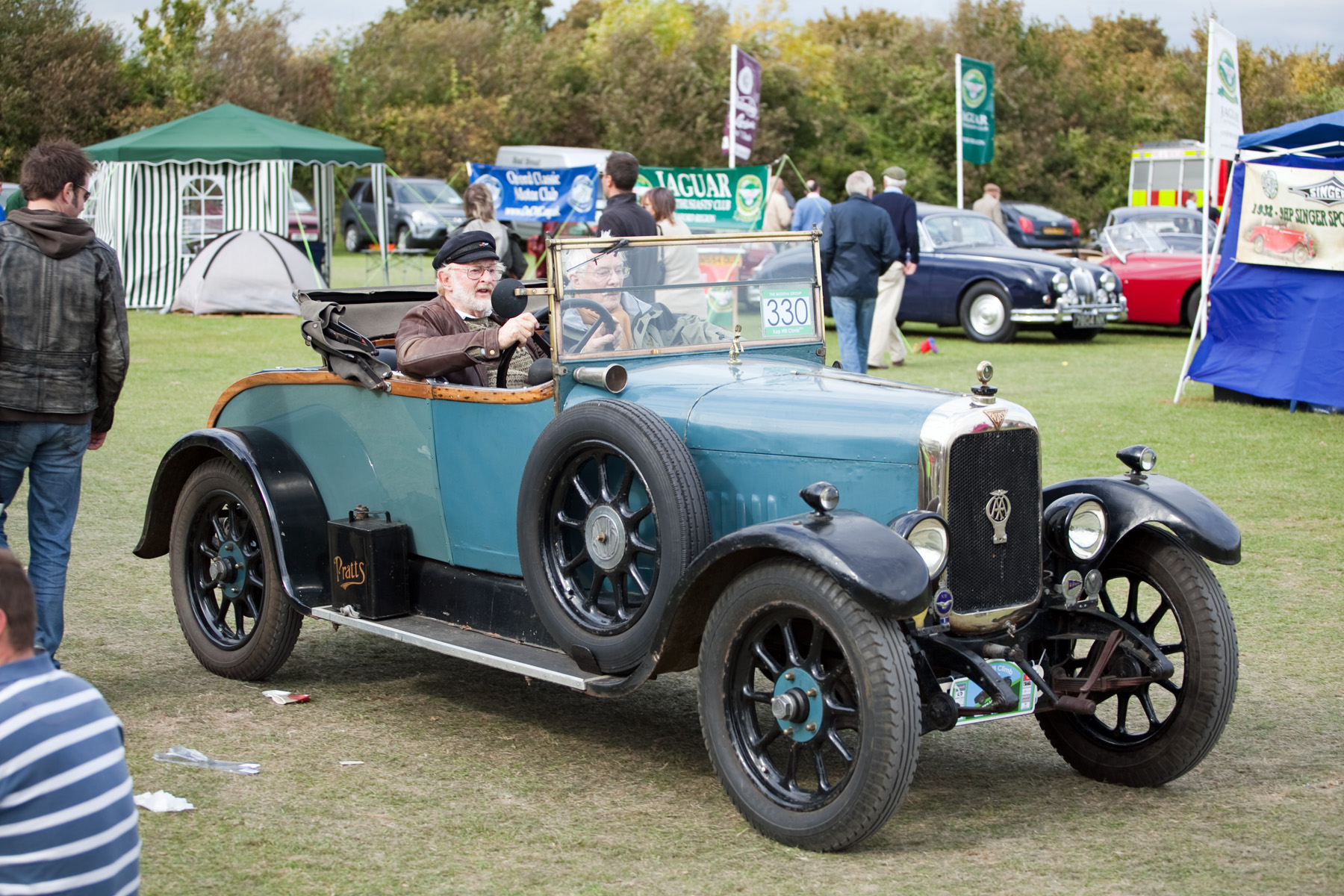
A 1923 12/40 open two-seater

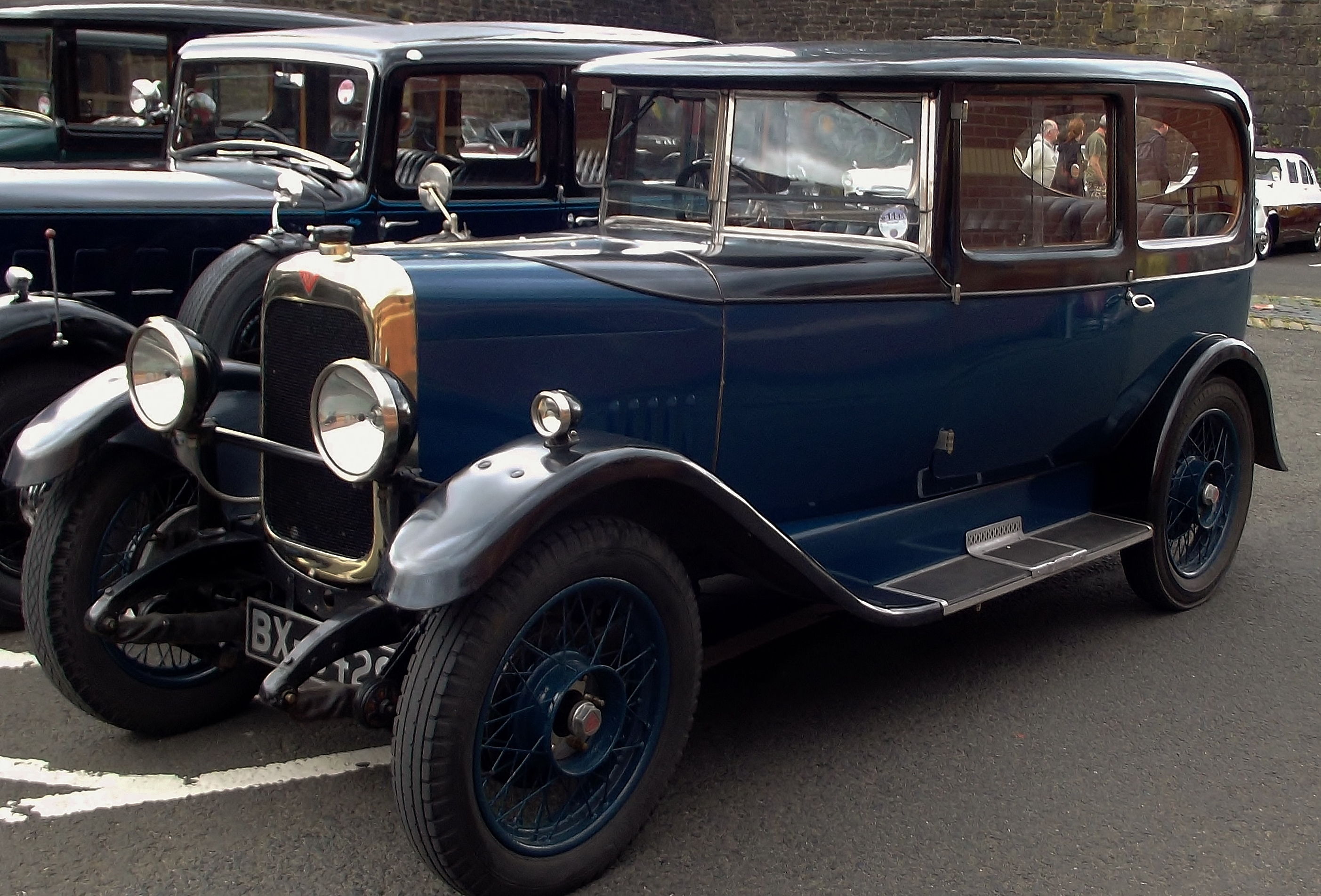
A 1928 12/50 Sportsman's 2-door saloon

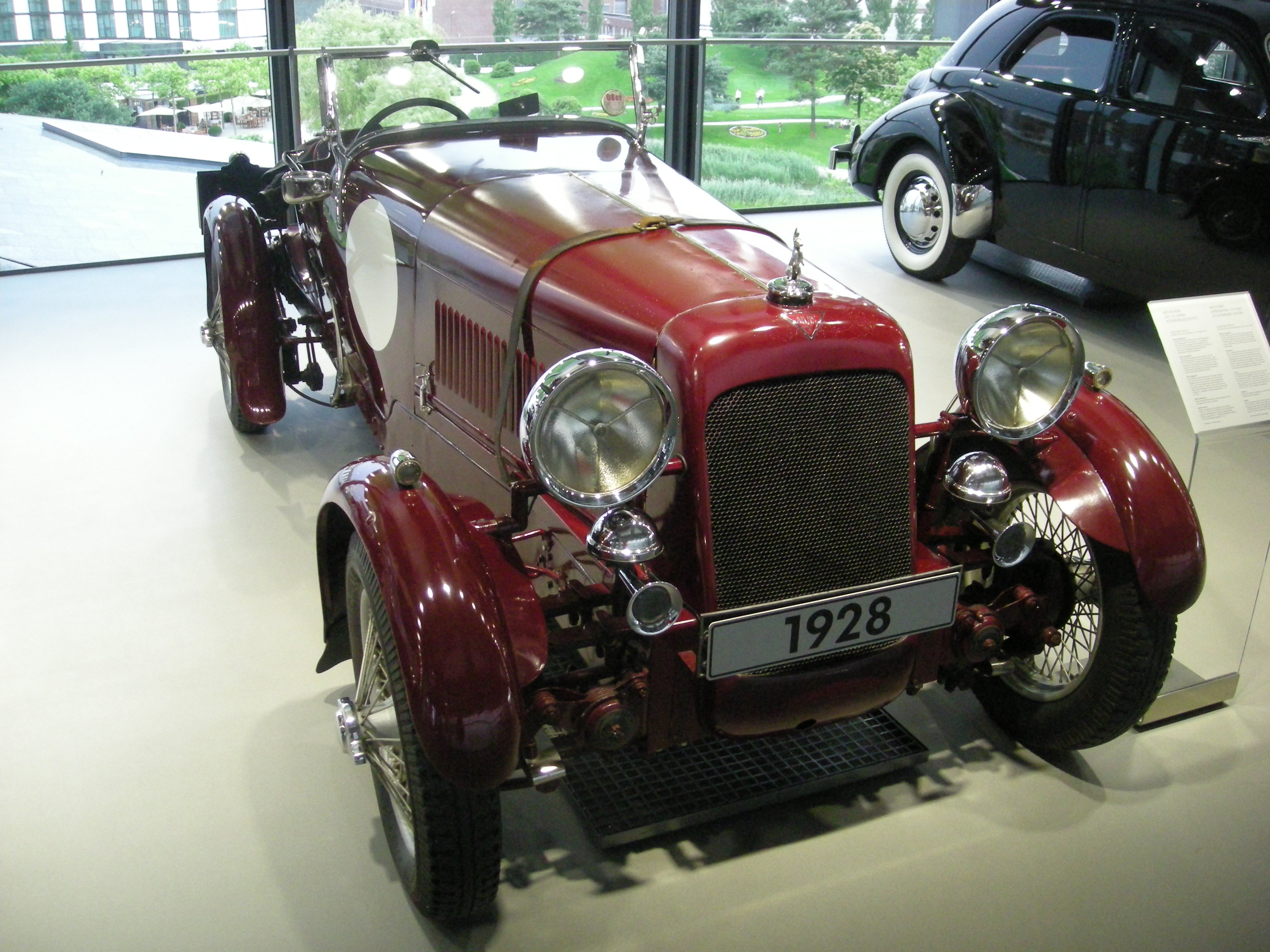
A 1928 12/75 front wheel drive open two-seater T.T. replica

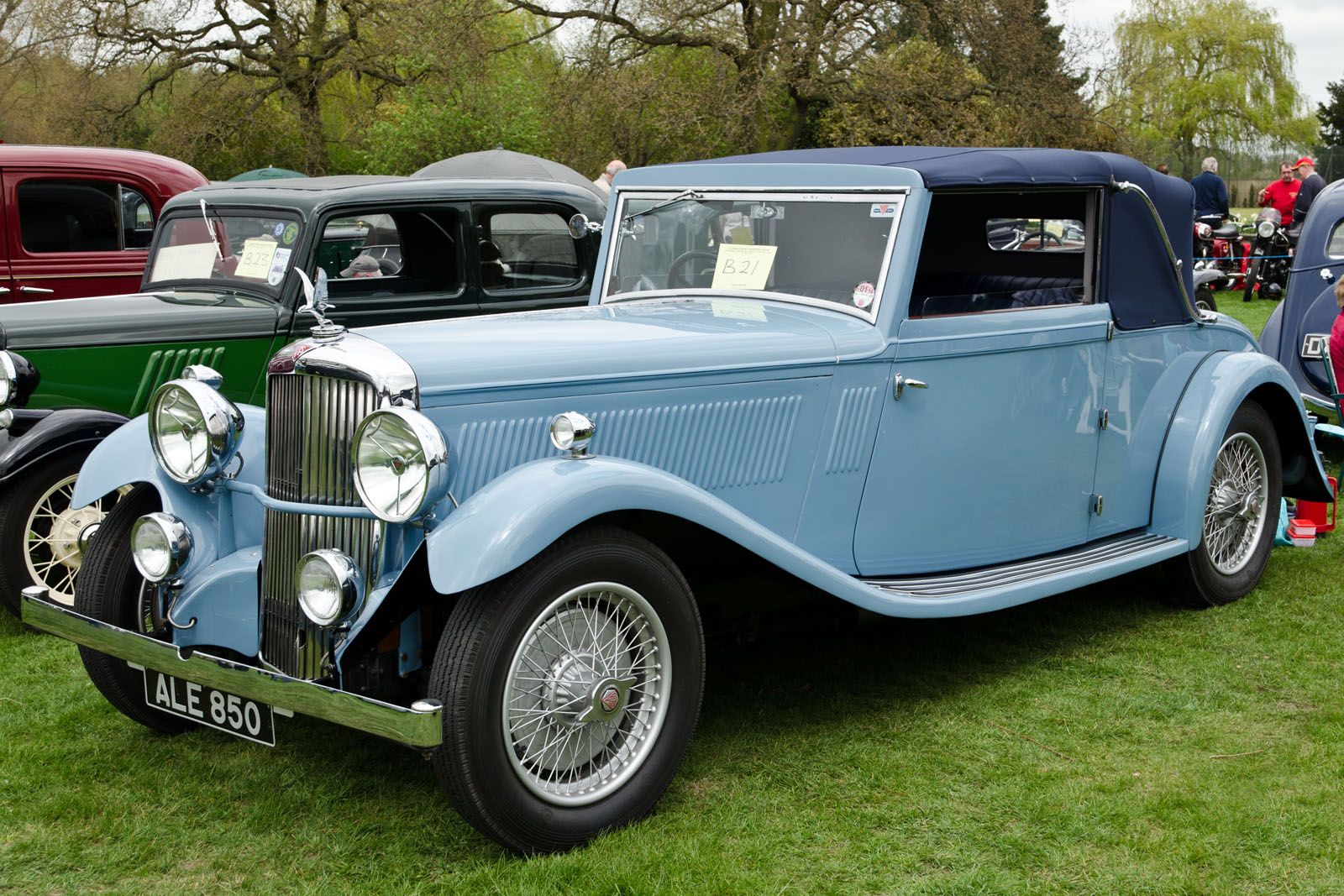
A 1933 Crested Eagle drophead coupé

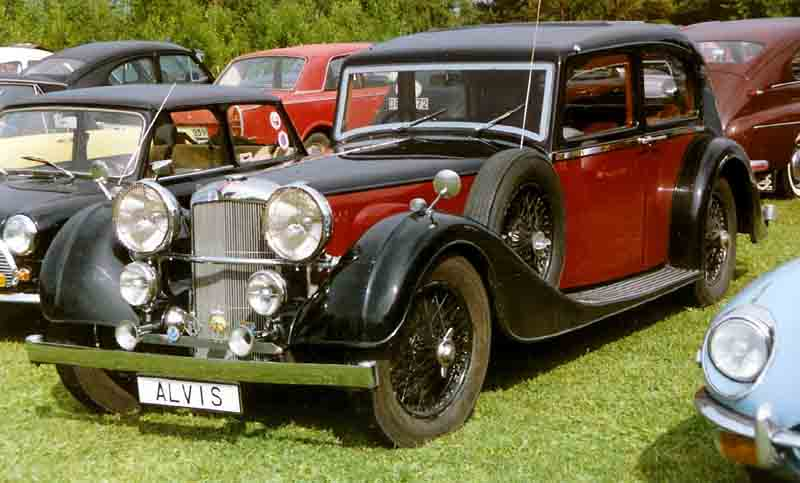
A 1938 4.3 Litre sports saloon

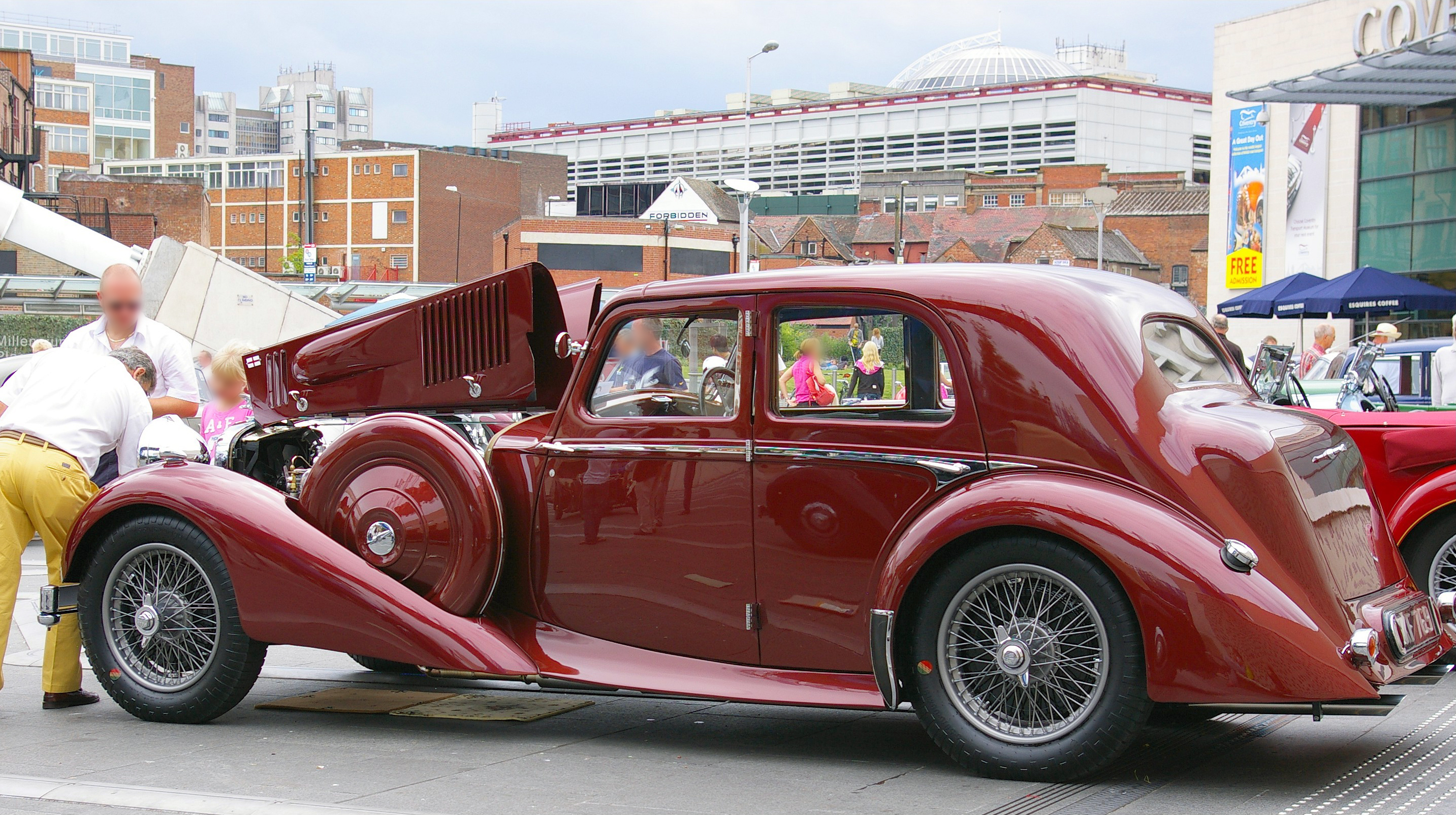
A 1939 Speed 25 sports saloon

=== Early history ===
The original company, T. G. John and Company Ltd., was founded in 1919 by Thomas George John (1880–1946). Its first products were stationary engines, carburettors, and motorscooters. Following complaints from the Avro aircraft company, whose logo bore similarities to the original winged green triangle, the more familiar inverted red triangle incorporating the word "Alvis" evolved. On 14 December 1921, the company officially changed its name to the Alvis Car and Engineering Company Ltd. Geoffrey de Freville (1883–1965) designed the first Alvis engine and is also responsible for the company name.

The origin of the name Alvis has been the subject of a great deal of speculation over the years. Some have suggested that de Freville proposed the name as a compound of the words "aluminium" and "vis" (meaning "strength" in Latin), or perhaps it may have been derived from the Norse mythological weaponsmith, Alvíss. De Freville vigorously rejected all of these theories. In 1921, he specifically stated that the name had no meaning whatsoever, and was chosen simply because it could be easily pronounced in any language. He reaffirmed this position in the early 1960s, stating that any other explanations for the source of the name were purely coincidental.

Production was relocated to Holyhead Road in Coventry, where from 1922 to 1923, they also made the Buckingham car. In 1922, George Thomas Smith-Clarke (1884–1960) left his job as assistant works manager at Daimler and joined Alvis as chief engineer and works manager. Smith-Clarke was accompanied by William M. Dunn, who left his job as a draughtsman at Daimler to become chief draughtsman at Alvis. This partnership lasted for nearly 28 years, and was responsible for producing some of the most successful products in the company's history. Smith-Clarke left in 1950, and Dunn assumed Smith-Clarke's position as chief engineer, remaining in that position until 1959.

De Freville's first engine design was a four-cylinder engine with aluminium pistons and pressure lubrication, which was unusual for that time. The first car model using de Freville's engine was the Alvis 10/30. It was an instant success and established the reputation for quality workmanship and superior performance for which the company was to become famous. The original 10/30 side-valve engine was improved, becoming, by 1923, the overhead valve Alvis 12/50, a highly successful sports car that was produced until 1932. Around 700 of the 12/50 models and 120 of the later Alvis 12/60 models survive today.

In 1927, the six-cylinder Alvis 14.75 was introduced; it became the basis for the long line of luxurious six-cylinder Alvis cars produced up to the outbreak of the Second World War. These cars were elegant and full of technical innovations. Independent front suspension and the world's first all-synchromesh gearbox came in 1933. followed by servo-assisted brakes. The Alvis 12/75 model was introduced in 1928, a model bristling with innovation, such as front-wheel drive, in-board brakes, overhead camshaft, and, as an option, a Roots-type supercharger.

As with many upmarket engineering companies of the time, Alvis did not produce their own coachwork, relying, instead, on the many available coachbuilders in the Midlands area, such as Carbodies, Charlesworth Bodies, Cross & Ellis, Duncan Industries, E. Bertelli Ltd, Holbrook, Grose, Gurney Nutting, Hooper, Lancefield Coachworks, Martin Walter, Mayfair Carriage Co, Mulliners, Tickford, Vanden Plas, Weymann Fabric Bodies, and Arnold of Manchester. Several cars also survive with interesting one-off bodywork from other designers.

In 1936, the company name was shortened to Alvis Ltd, and aircraft engine and armoured vehicle divisions were added to the company by the beginning of the Second World War. Smith-Clarke designed several models during the 1930s and 1940s, including the six-cylinder Speed 20, the Speed 25, and the Alvis 4.3 Litre model.

=== Second World War ===
Car production was initially suspended in September 1939 following the outbreak of war in Europe. It later resumed and production of the 12/70, Crested Eagle, Speed 25, and 4.3 Litre continued well into 1940. The car factory was severely damaged on 14 November 1940 as a result of several bombing raids on Coventry by the German Luftwaffe, although the armaments factory suffered little damage. Much valuable cutting gear and other equipment was lost and car production was suspended for the duration of the war, only resuming during the latter part of 1946. Despite this, Alvis carried out war production on aircraft engines (as subcontractor of Rolls-Royce Limited) and other aircraft equipment in its shadow factories.

=== Post war ===
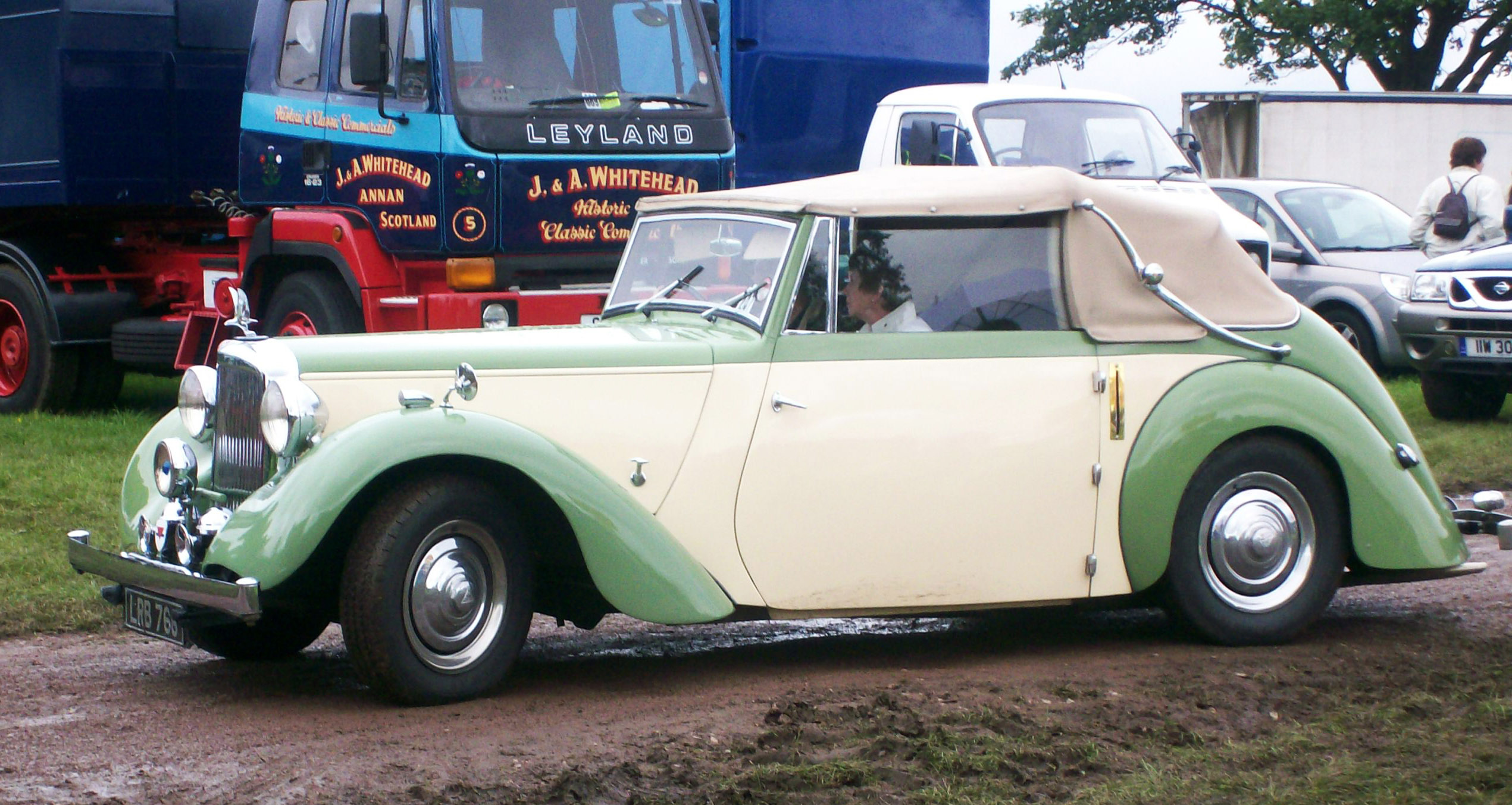
1948 Fourteen drophead coupé-cabriolet

Car production resumed with a four-cylinder model, the TA 14, based on the prewar 12/70. The TA 14 fitted well the mood of sober austerity in postwar Britain, but much of the interest in the prewar models had gone, and life was hard for a specialist car manufacturer. Alvis and many of the prewar coachbuilders went either defunct or acquired by other manufacturers. The postwar history of Alvis was dominated by the quest for reliable and reasonably priced coachwork.

=== 1950s ===
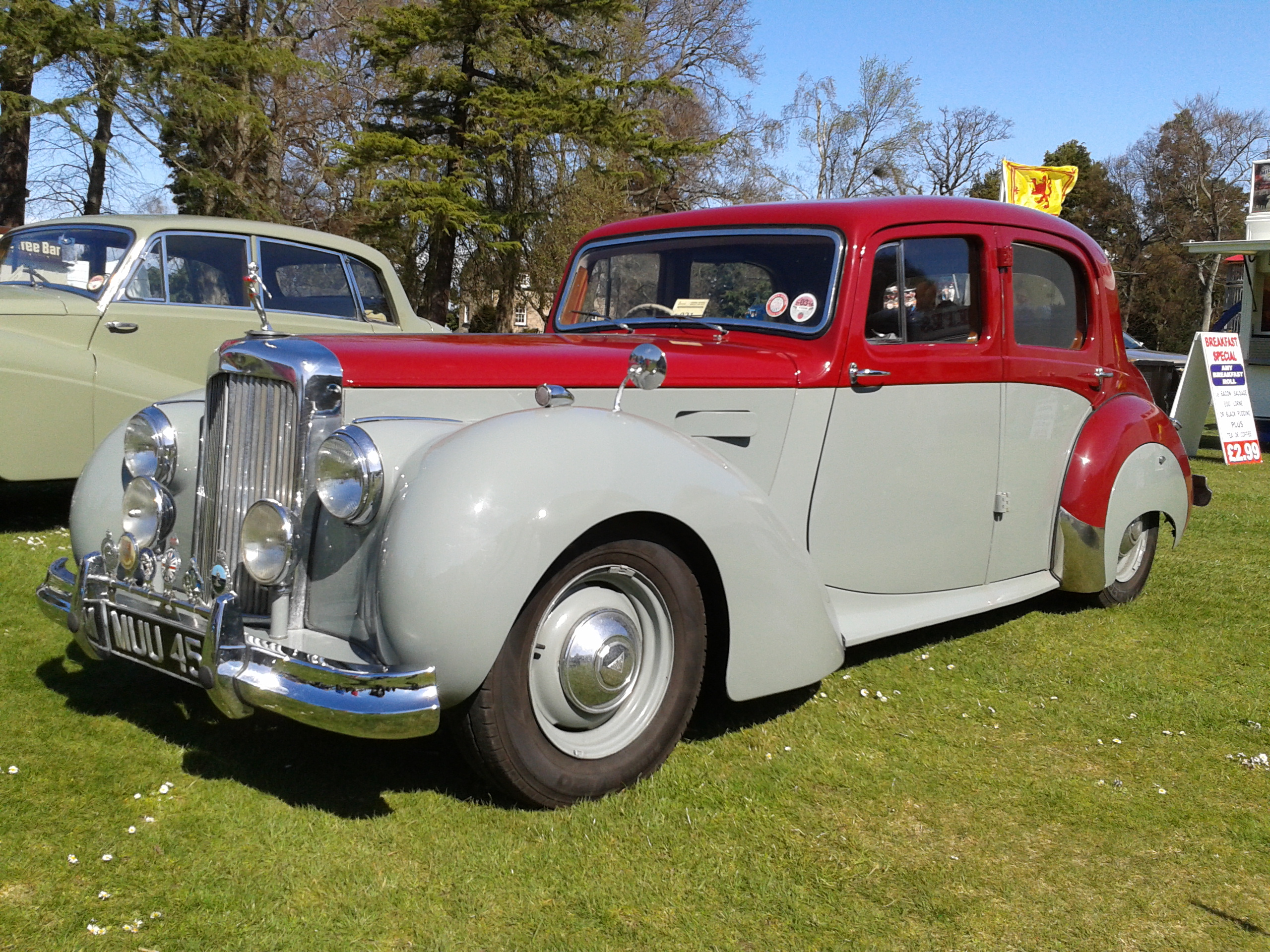
A 1952 Three Litre sports saloon

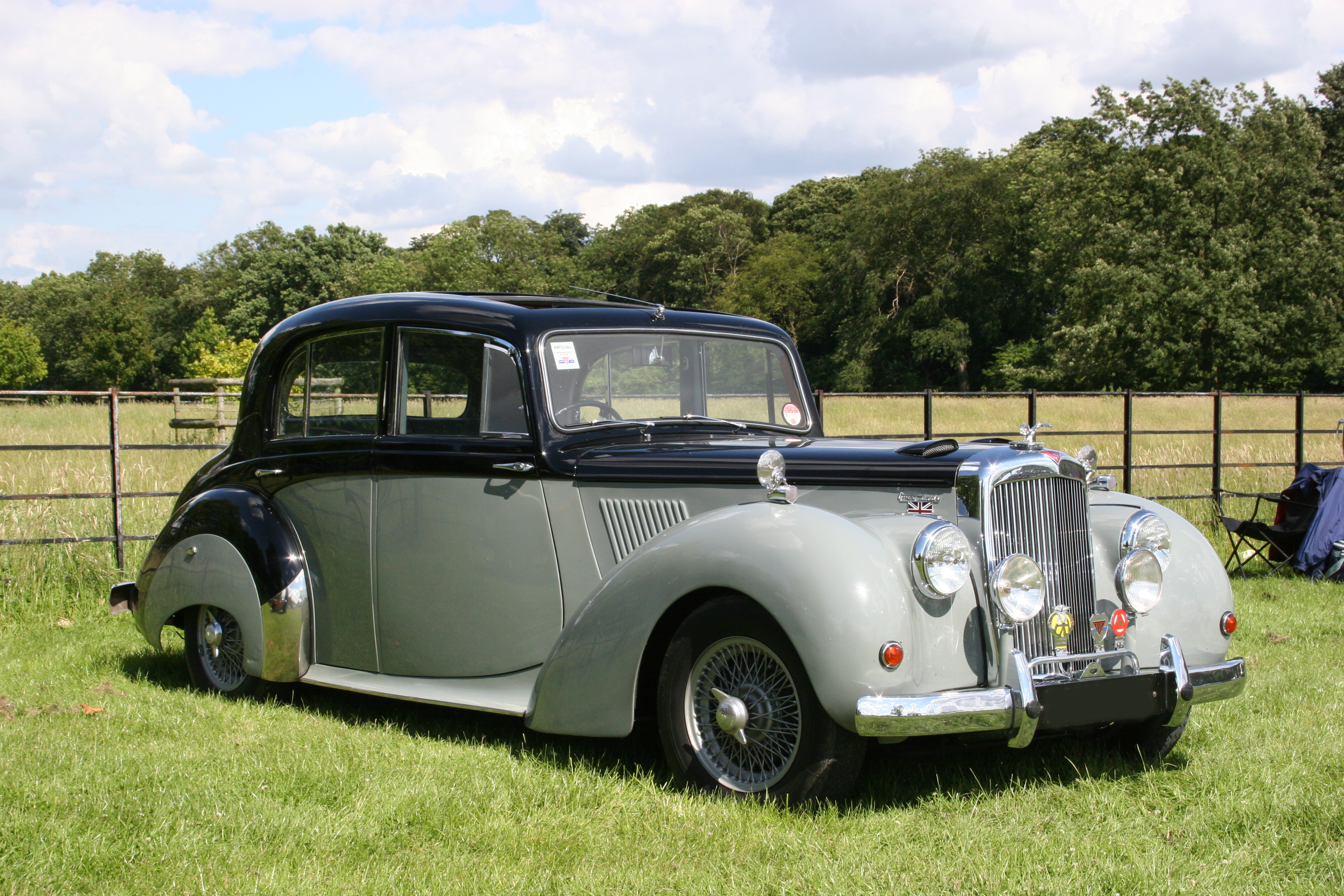
A Three Litre TC 21/100 Grey Lady sports saloon

Smith-Clarke retired in 1950, and Dunn took over as chief engineer. Before retiring, Smith-Clarke came up with the Alvis 3L3, TA21 prototype in 1947, TA14 body with a six-cylinder 3-litre engine, after retiring he used the prototype Alvis 3L3 as his personal car. In 1950, a new chassis based on the TA14 and six-cylinder 3-litre engine was announced, and this highly successful engine became the basis of all Alvis models until production ceased in 1967.

Saloon bodies for the TA 21, as the new model was called, came from Mulliners of Birmingham, as they had for the TA 14, with Tickford producing the dropheads. With Mulliners switching to the supply of only Standard Triumph in October 1954, which purchased Mulliners in 1958, and Tickford being acquired by David Brown, owner of Aston Martin Lagonda in late 1955, new arrangements were made, so that some of the original designs on the Three Litre chassis were being produced by master coachbuilder Carrosserie Hermann Graber of Switzerland.

Graber had begun to use TA 14 chassis soon after the war, building three Tropic coupés which were much admired. When the Three Litre chassis was introduced, his bodies displayed at the Geneva Motor Shows in 1951 and 1952 attracted sufficient interest for Graber to set up a standing order of 30 chassis per year. Swiss-built Graber coupés were displayed on the Alvis stand at both Paris and London Motor Shows in October 1955.

With a licence in place, from late 1955 all Alvis bodies became based on Graber designs, but few chassis and few bodies were built over the next two years. Around 15 or 16 TC108/Gs were built by Willowbrook Limited of Loughborough and Willowbrook was subsequently taken over by Duple Coachbuilders. Over the same two years Graber built 22 TC 108Gs and complained that if he had received chassis he would have committed himself to buying 20 a year.

In late 1958 with the launch of the TD 21, Rolls-Royce subsidiary Park Ward began to build the new bodies modified in many small ways. The TD 21 and its later variants, the TE 21 and the TF 21 are affordable cars. With a price tag of nearly double that of the mass-produced Jaguar, the end could not be far off.

From 1952 to 1955 Alec Issigonis, the creator of the later Mini, worked for Alvis and designed a new model with a V8 engine which proved too expensive to produce.

=== 1960s ===
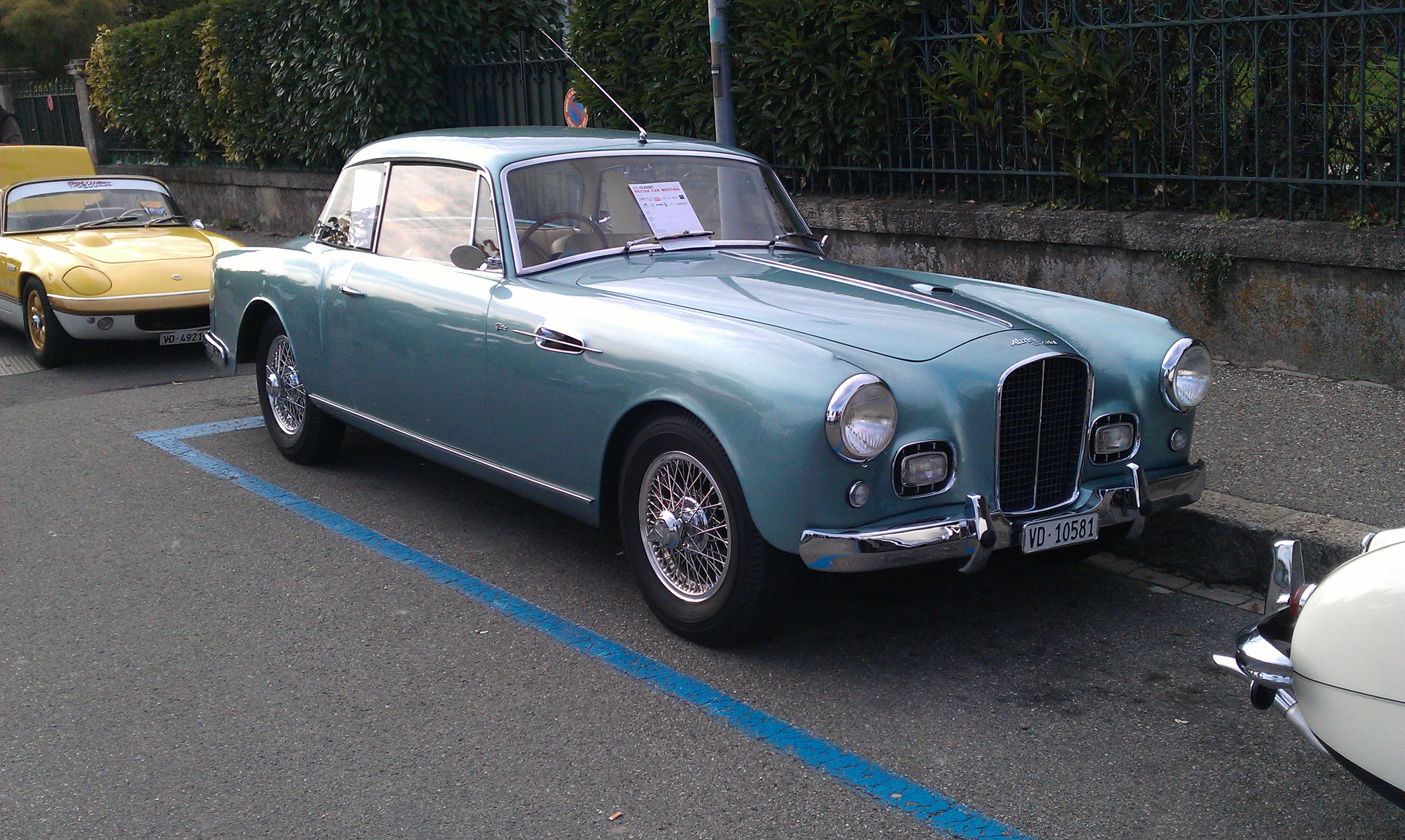
1957 Three Litre TC 108G fixed head coupé

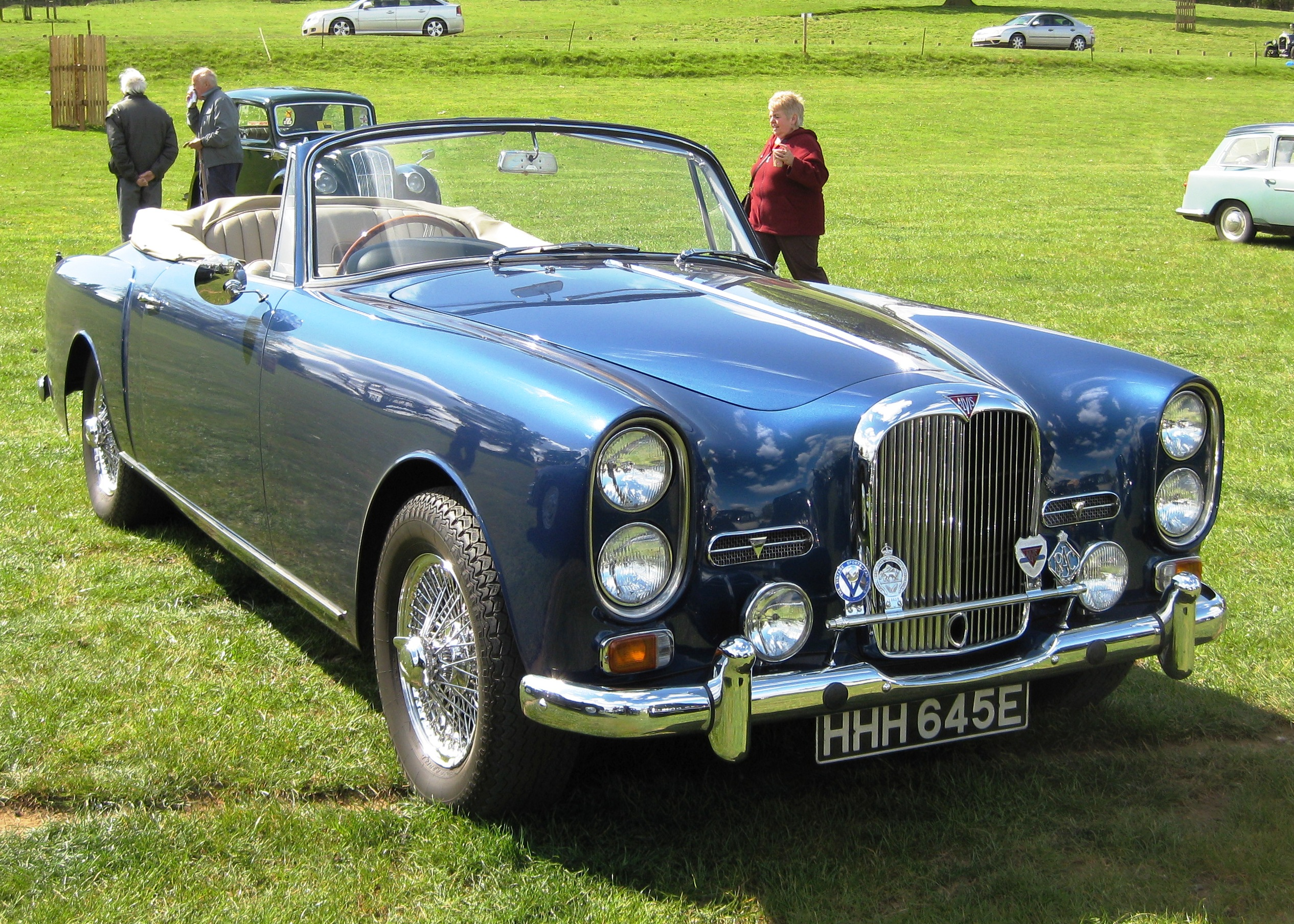
1967 Three Litre series IV drophead coupé or cabriolet

Rover took a controlling interest in Alvis in 1965. A Rover-designed mid-engined V8 coupé prototype named the P6BS was rumoured to be the new Alvis model, but with the takeover by British Leyland this too was shelved. By the time the TF 21 was launched in 1966, it was available in both saloon and drophead forms, with either a manual or automatic gearbox, and was beginning to show its age, despite boasting a top speed of 127 mph – the fastest Alvis ever produced. With only 109 sold and with political troubles aplenty in the UK car manufacturing business at that time, production ceased in 1967.

In 1968, a management buyout of the car operations was finalised and all the Alvis car design plans, customer records, stock of parts and remaining employees were transferred to Red Triangle, a company founded by ex-employees of Alvis to provide parts and service for their cars.

=== 1970s to 2004 ===
As part of Rover, Alvis Limited was incorporated into British Leyland but was bought by United Scientific Holdings plc in 1981. Subsequently, the company's name was changed to Alvis plc. Alvis plc acquired British truck manufacturer Universal Power Drives in 1994, naming their new subsidiary Alvis Unipower Limited. The trucks were subsequently branded as Alvis-Unipower.

In 1998, Alvis plc acquired the armoured vehicle business of GKN plc, and the main UK manufacturing operation was moved from Coventry to Telford. The site of the Alvis works in Holyhead Road is now an out-of-town shopping complex, but its name, Alvis Retail Park, reflects the heritage of the site. In 2002 Alvis plc purchased Vickers Defence Systems to form the subsidiary Alvis Vickers Ltd, which was in turn purchased by BAE Systems in 2004. BAE Systems ended the use of the Alvis distinctive red triangle trademark.

In 2009, Red Triangle negotiated the legal transfer of the Alvis car trademarks. The following year, the company announced that the 4.3 Litre Short Chassis tourer would once again be available. All Alvis' records remain intact at the company's Kenilworth headquarters along with a large stock of period parts. One of the men to have worked on the last Alvis car produced in 1967 is still retained by Red Triangle in a training capacity.

Built to the original plans, the new car has been named the "Continuation Series", to reflect the 73-year interruption in its production between 1937 and 2010. It differs only in detail from the pre-war examples: for emissions, the engine is governed by an electronic fuel injection system with electronic ignition, brakes are hydraulic rather than cable, the steering column collapsible and the rear light arrangement reconfigured to conform to modern standards.

== Revived company ==
In 2012 Alvis announced it would offer five variants of its cars. These included both 4.3 litre and 3 litre chassis derivatives. In 2019, a sixth model was released to coincide with the agreement for Meiji Sangyo to be the distributor for Asia.

In 2021, the firm was featured in the BBC Four documentary Classic British Cars: Made in Coventry and released its Graber Super Coupe continuation car, with a convertible version due out in 2022.

== Alvis automobiles ==
=== List of most commercially available models, 1920–1967 ===
Model name	cyl.	disp.	b.h.p.	tax H.P.	Body	From	To	Number produced (Note: Figures in brackets show those cars that were bodied by Graber out of the number produced. Source TC108/G flash demonstration www.alvis-tc108-graber.ch accessed 8 April 2023)	Comments
10/30	4	1460	30	10.48	2-seater with double dickey, tourer	1920	1923	603	side valves
11/40	4	1598	40	11.40	4-seater tourer and a full range of other types	1921	1923	382	side valves
12/40	4	1598	40	11.47		1922	1925	1552	side valves
12/50	4	1496	—	11.47	2 seat sports, drophead coupé, saloon	1923	1929	3616	Types: SA, SD, TF, TH
12/50	4	1598	50	11.47	2 seat sports, drophead coupé, saloon	1924	1925	3616	Type: SB, SC,
12/50	4	1645	52	11.81	2 seat sports, drophead coupé, saloon	1926	1932	3616	Types: TE, TG, TJ
12/80	4	1598		11.47	2 seat sports	1926	1926		cost £1000, guaranteed maximum of 100 mph
14.75	6	1870	75	14.75	Alvista saloon	1927	1929	492	Types: SA, TA, TB
12/75 with optional supercharger	4	1481	50	11.40	Front-wheel drive; 2-seat sports, 4-seat sports, Alvista sports saloon	1928	1931	142	Types: short chassis (FA and FD), long chassis (FB and FE) 75 b.h.p. supercharged
Ulster T T optional supercharger	8	1491	125	15.00	Front-wheel drive; 2-seat sports, 4-seat sports	1928	1929	12?	Guaranteed 95 mph in touring trim, 100 mph in racing trim
Silver Eagle	6	1991	—	16.95	2 seat sports, coupé, drophead coupé, saloon	1930	1930	1357	Type: SD
Silver Eagle	6	2148	72	16.95	2 seat sports, coupé, drophead coupé, saloon	1929	1936	1357	Types: SA, SE, SF, SG, TA, TB, TC
Silver Eagle	6	2362	66	16.95	2 seat sports, coupé, drophead coupé, saloon	1935	1935	1357	Type: SG
Silver Eagle	6	2511	75	16.95	2 seat sports, coupé, drophead coupé, saloon	1931	1932	1357	Types: SA, TB, TC
12/60	4	1645	54	11.81	2-seat sports, 4-seat sports, sports saloon	1931	1932	282	Types: TK, TL
Speed 20	6	2511	87	19.82	sports tourer, drophead coupé, sports saloon	1932	1934	1165	Types: SA, SB
Speed 20	6	2762	95	19.82	sports tourer, drophead coupé, sports saloon	1935	1936	1165	Types: SC, SD
Firefly	4	1496	50	11.81	4 light saloon, 6 light saloon, drophead coupé, sports tourer	1933	1934	904	Types: SA, SB
Crested Eagle	6	2148	—	16.95	4 light saloon, 6 light saloon, limousine	1933	1934	652	Types: TE
Crested Eagle	6	2511	72	19.82	4 light saloon, 6 light saloon, limousine	1933	1934	652	Types: TD, TE
Crested Eagle	6	2762	77	19.82	4 light saloon, 6 light saloon, limousine	1935	1940	652	Types: TF, TG, TJ, TK
Crested Eagle	6	3571	106	25.63	4 light saloon, 6 light saloon, limousine	1937	1940	652	Types: TA, TB, TC, TD
Firebird	4	1842	55	13.22	4 light saloon, 6 light saloon, drophead coupé, sports tourer	1935	1939	449	Type: SA
3 1/2 Litre	6	3571	102	25.63	chassis	1935	1936	61	
Speed 25	6	3571	110	25.63	sports tourer, drophead coupé, sports saloon	1936	1940	391	
4.3 Litre	6	4387	137	31.48	sports saloon, sports tourer	1937	1940	204	
Silver Crest	6	2362	68	16.95	Seventeen 4 light saloon, 6 light saloon, drophead coupé	1937	1940	344	Type: TF
Silver Crest	6	2762	95	19.82	Seventeen 4 light saloon, 6 light saloon, drophead coupé	1937	1940	344	Type: TH
12/70	4	1842	63	13.22	sports tourer, drophead coupé, sports saloon	1938	1940	776	Bodies by Mulliners (Birmingham)
TA 14	4	1892	65	13.58	sports saloon, drophead coupé	1946	1950	3311	Bodies by Mulliners (Birmingham), coupés by Tickford
TB 14	4	1892	68	13.58	2 seater sports	1948	1950	100	Body by A P Metalcraft
TA 21	6	2993	83	26.25	sports saloon, drophead coupé	1950	1953	1316 (9)	Bodies by Mulliners (Birmingham), coupés by Tickford
TB 21	6	2993	90	26.25	2-seater sports	1950	1953	31	Body by A P Metalcraft
TC 21 TC 21/100; Grey Lady	6	2993	90 100	26.25	sports saloon, drophead coupé	1953	1955	757 (23)	Bodies by Mulliners (Birmingham), coupés by Tickford
TC 108G	6	2993	104	26.25	sports saloon	1955	1958	37	Bodies by Graber (22) and Willowbrook (15)
TD 21 I & II	6	2993	115	26.25	2 dr saloon, drophead coupé	1958	1963	1073 (51)	Graber styled saloon and coupé bodies by Park Ward; later Mulliner Park Ward
TE 21 III	6	2993	130	26.25	2dr saloon, drophead coupé	1964	1966	352 (12)	as TD 21
TF 21 IV	6	2993	150	26.25	2dr saloon, drophead coupé	1966	1967	106 (6)	Production ended September 1967

=== Racing cars ===
Three British car companies – Alvis, Bentley, and Sunbeam – entered vehicles in local racing events between 1920 and 1930. Alvis and Sunbeam were at that time the only British companies building cars to Grand Prix formula racing specifications. Of these, Alvis was the only company whose racing cars were characterized by front-wheel drive and fully independent suspension.

Alvis was a pioneer of front-wheel drive vehicles. While J. Walter Christie had designed the first front-wheel drive racing car, which he drove in the 1906 Vanderbilt Cup, the next notable front-wheel drive race car was the supercharged Alvis 12/50 racing car designed by G. T. Smith-Clarke and W. M. Dunn, which was entered in the 1925 Kop Hill Climb in Princes Risborough in Buckinghamshire on 28 March 1925. Two months later (on Saturday, 30 May 1925), Harry Arminius Miller's Miller 122 front-wheel drive car was entered in the 1925 Indianapolis 500.

=== Gallery of racing cars ===
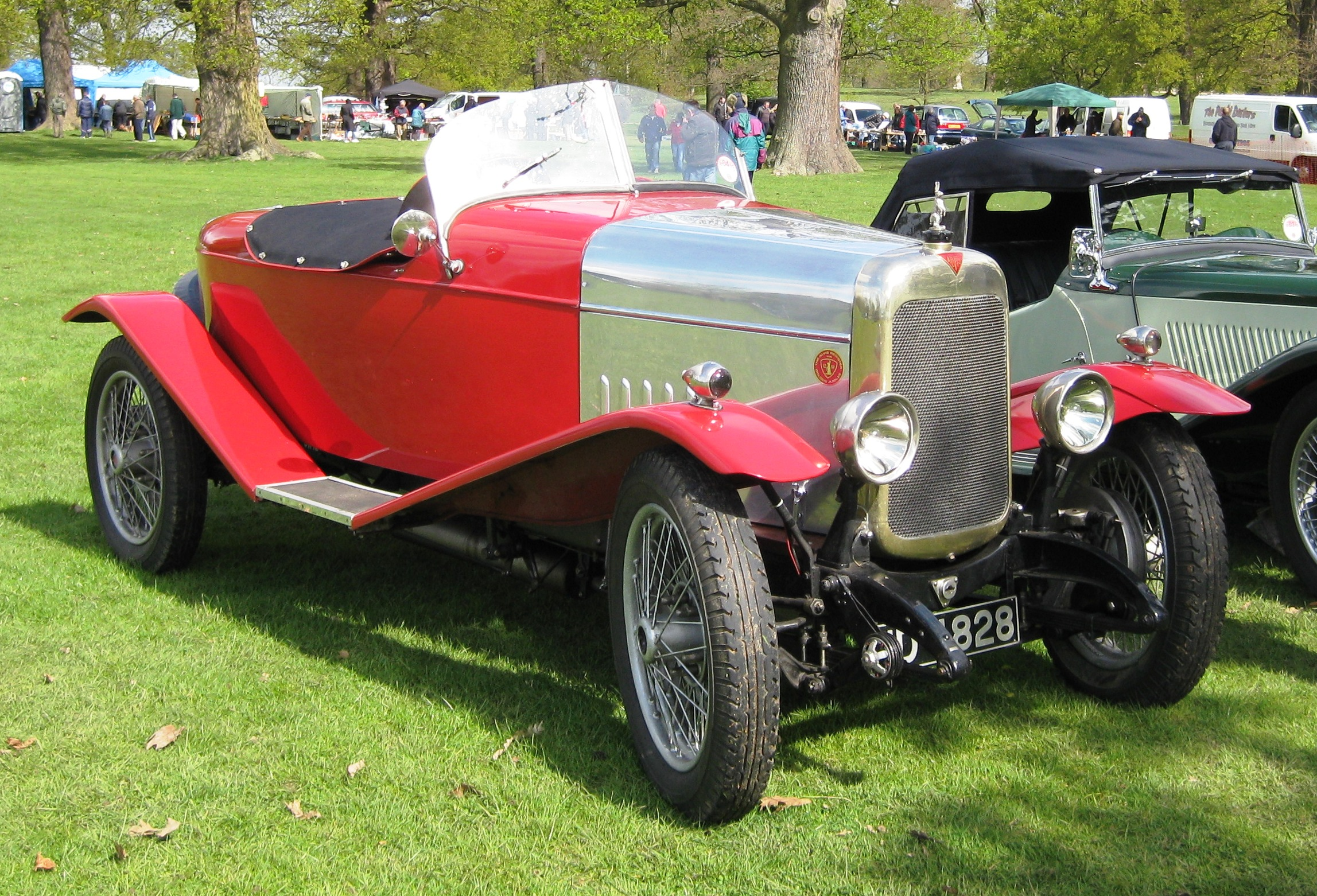
1932 Alvis 12/50 Type TJ, rebuilt to resemble a car of the mid-1920s

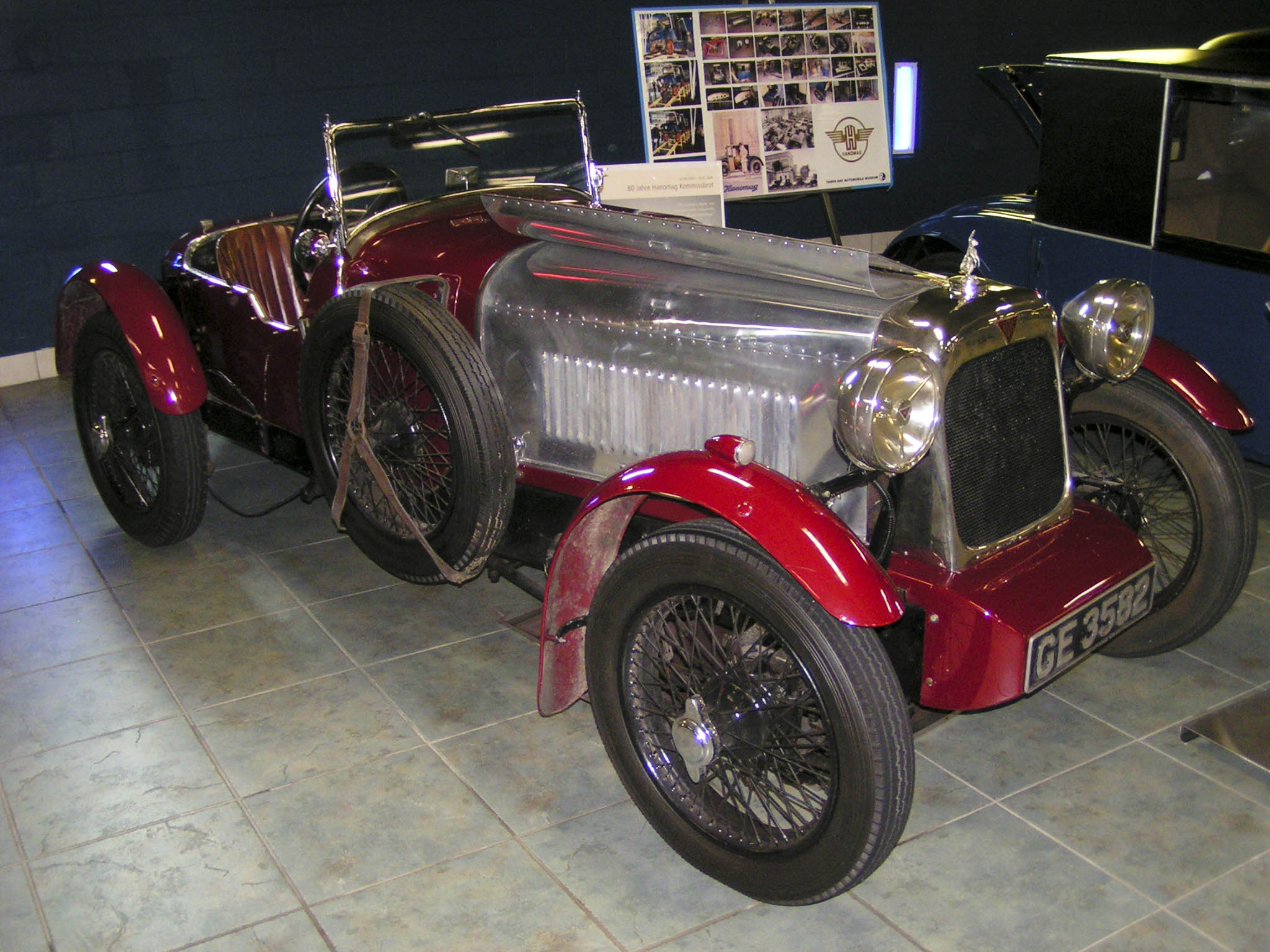
1928 Alvis 12/75 Type FD 2 seat front-wheel drive sports car with a 1.5L supercharged engine and Tourist Trophy Race bodywork

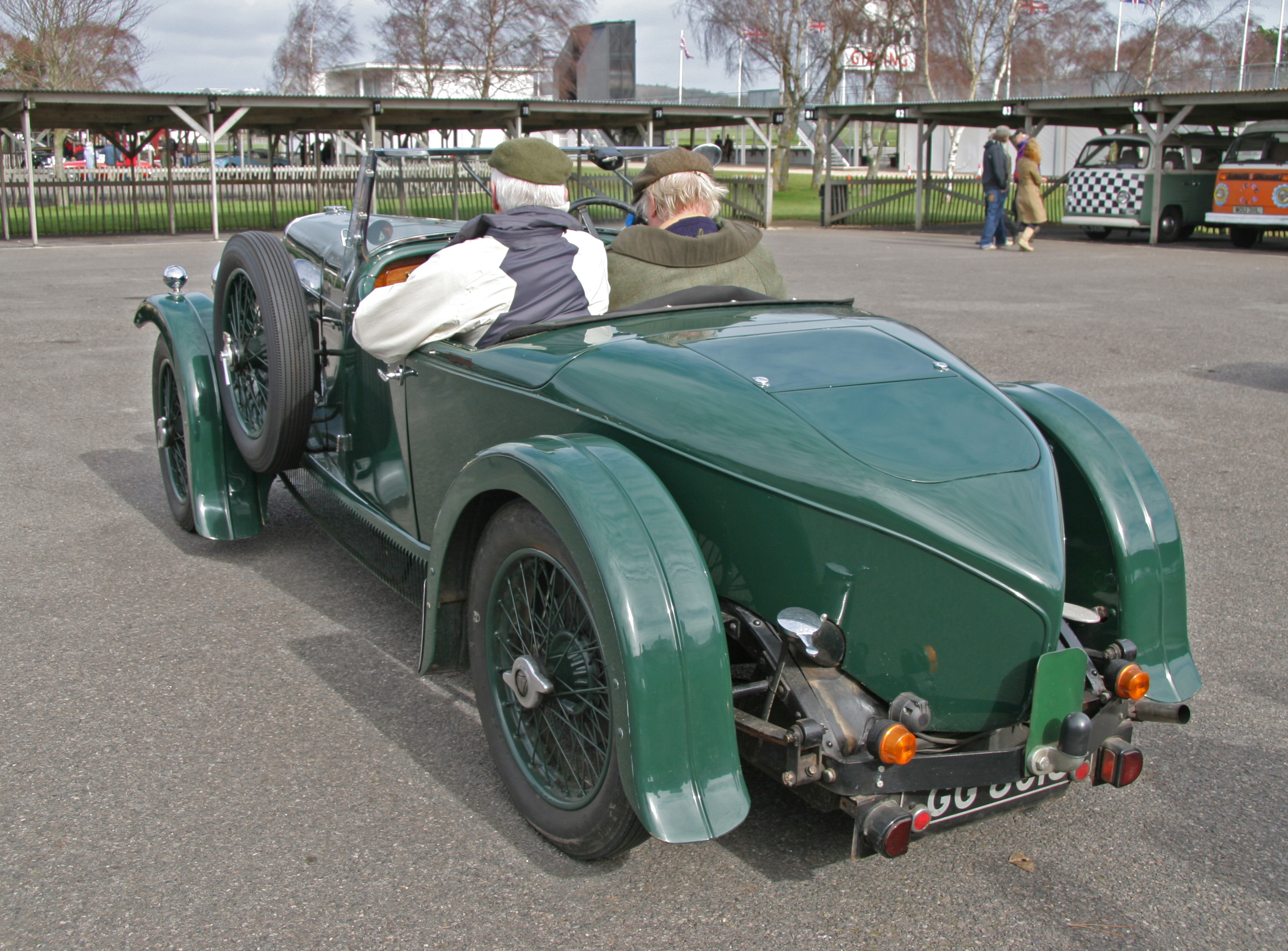
1932 Alvis 12/60 Type TL 2 seat with "beetle-back" type coachwork

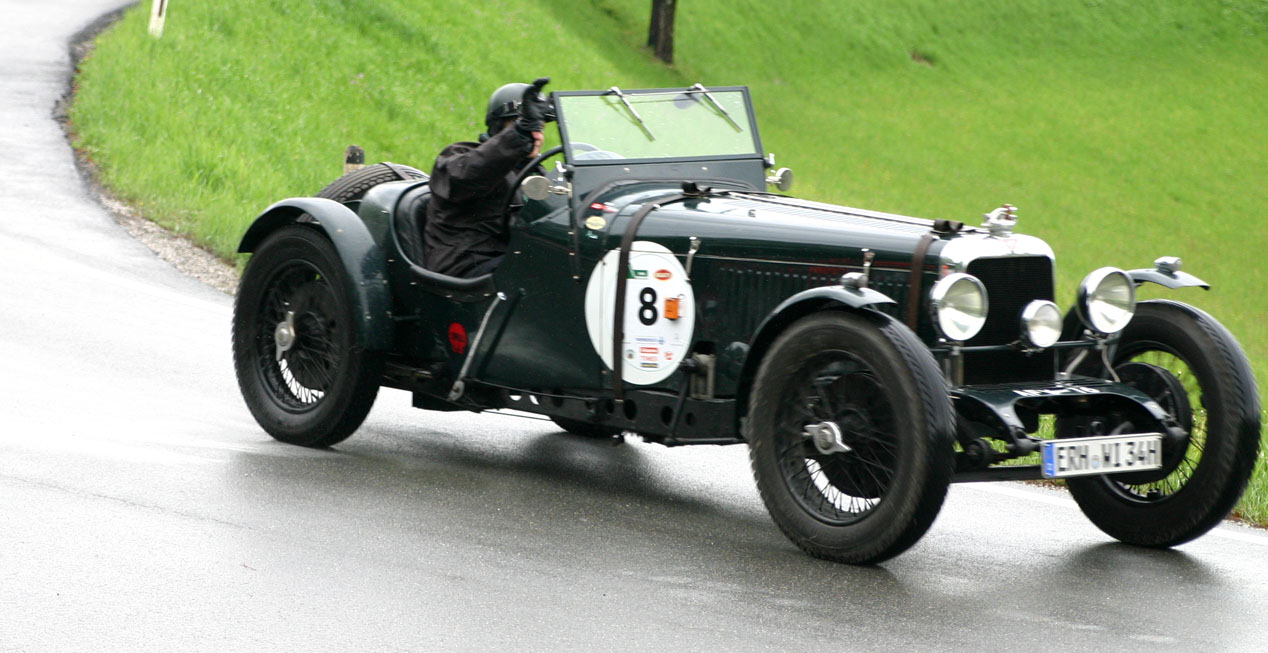
1934 Alvis Silver Eagle Type SF

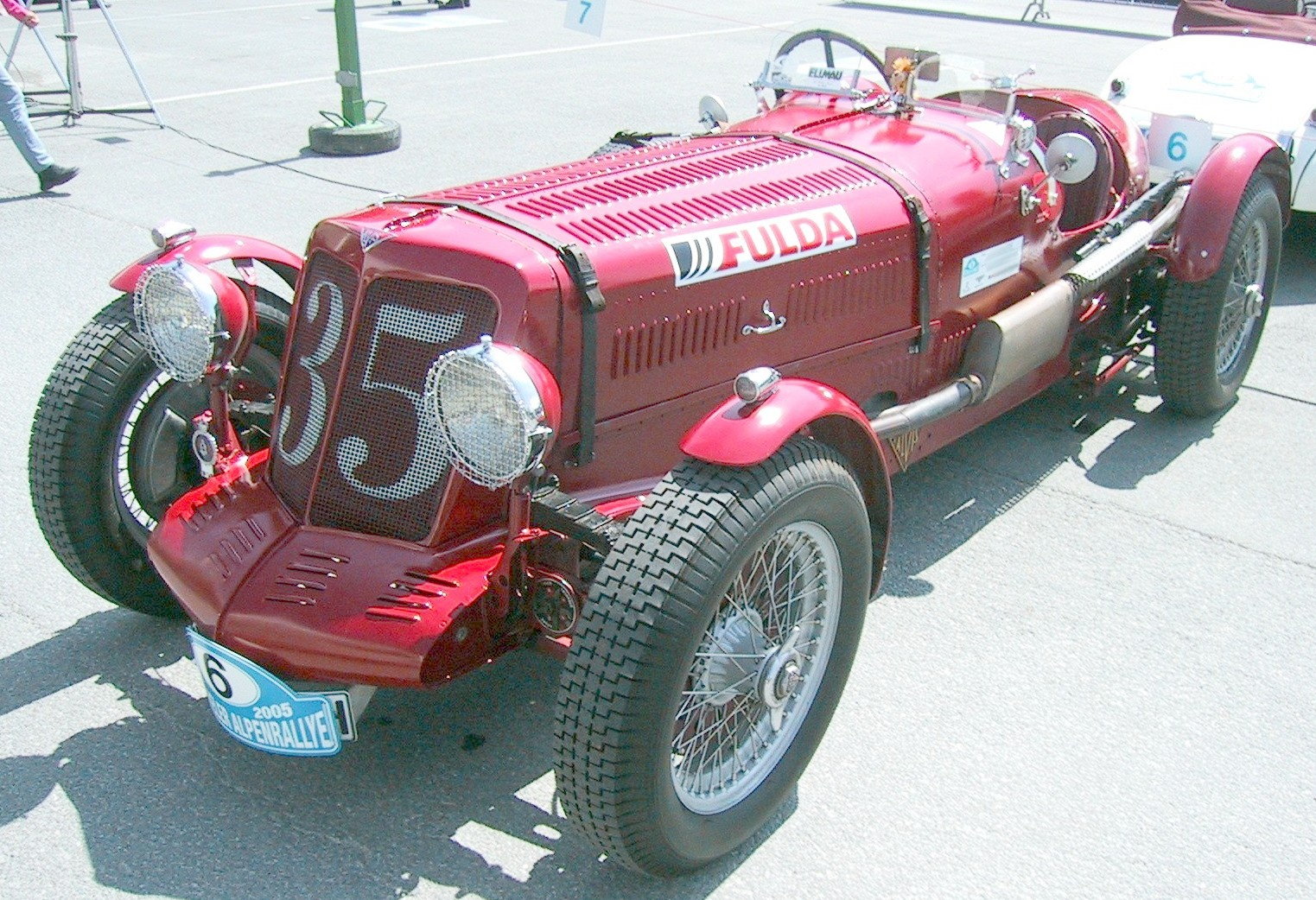
1935 Alvis 4.3 Litre

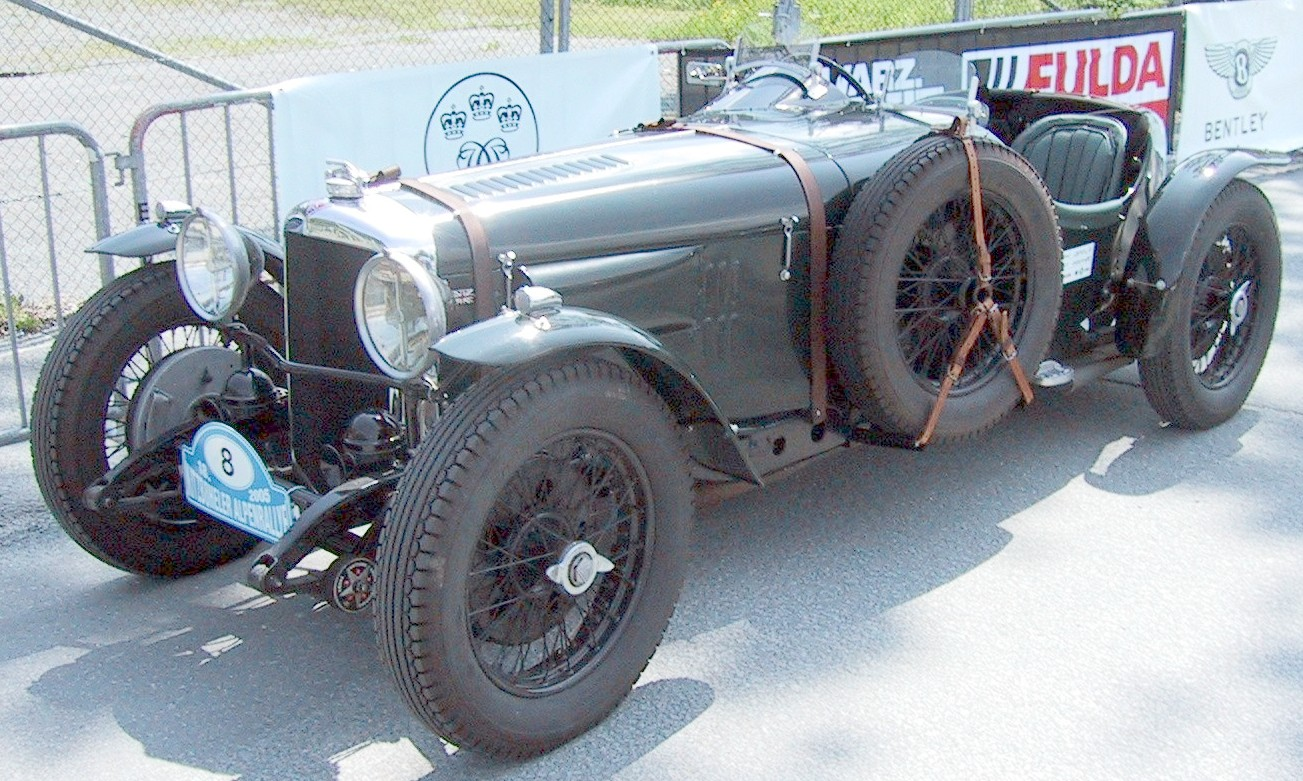
1936 Alvis Speed 20

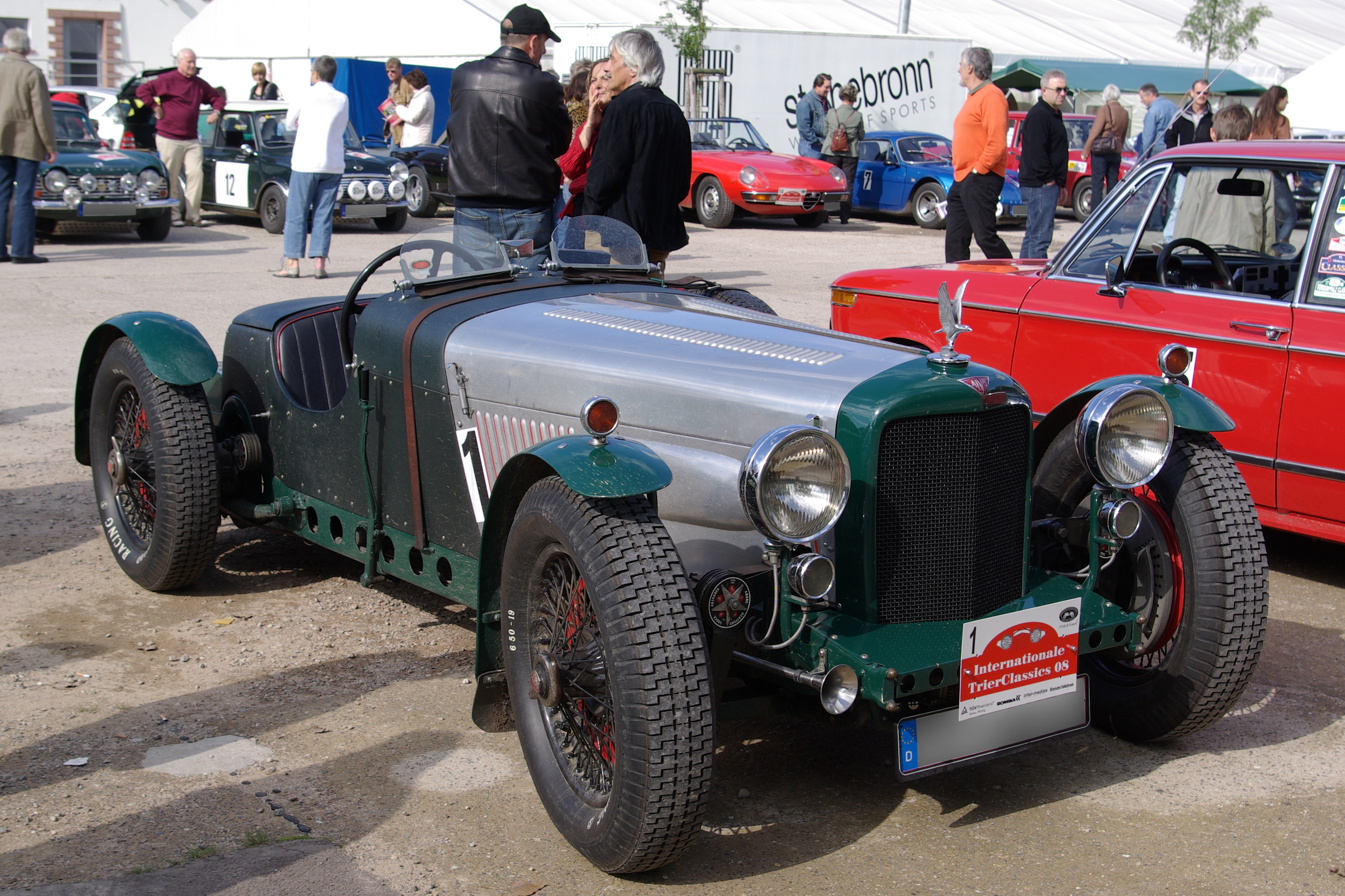
1936 Alvis Speed 25

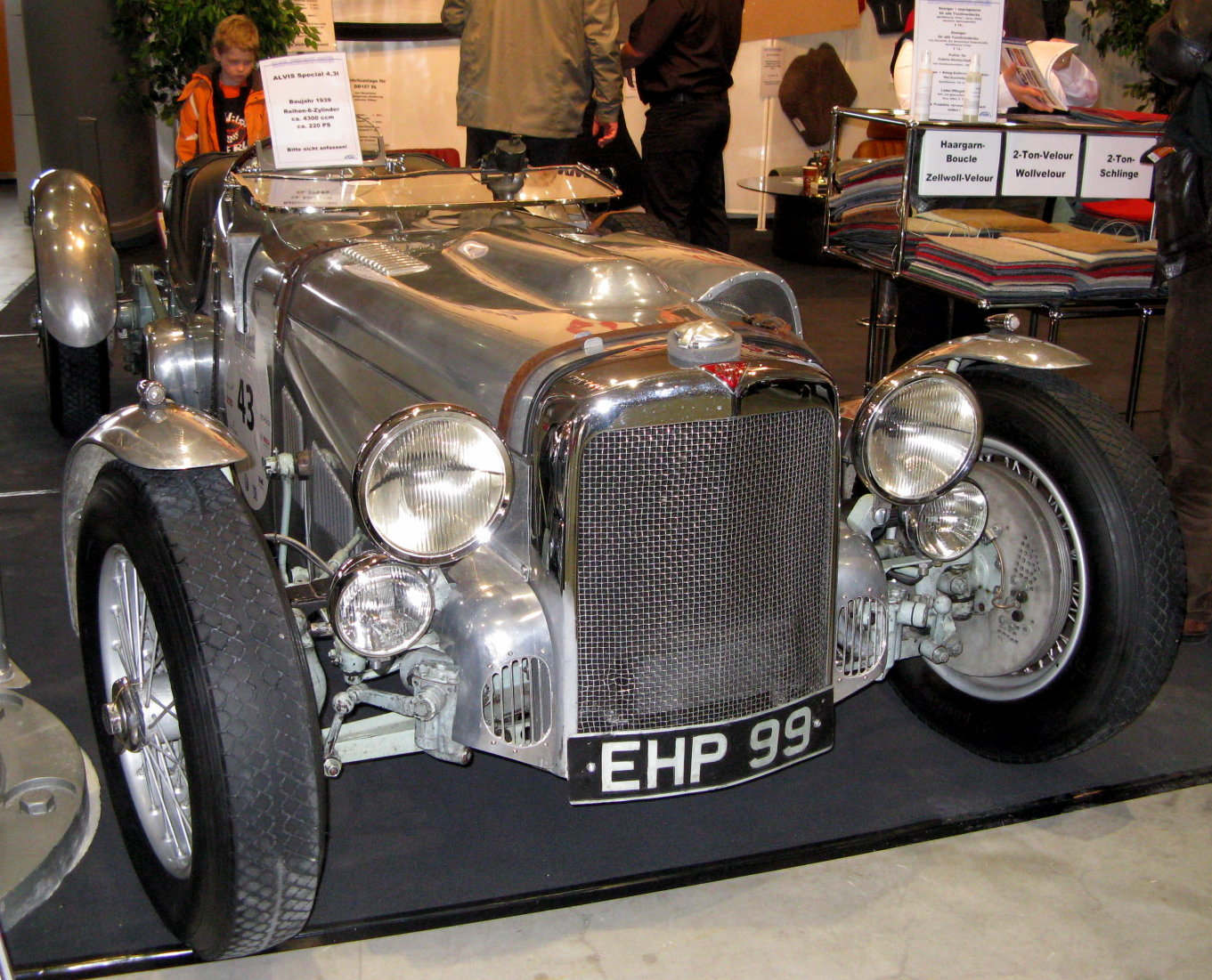
1939 Alvis 4.3 Litre

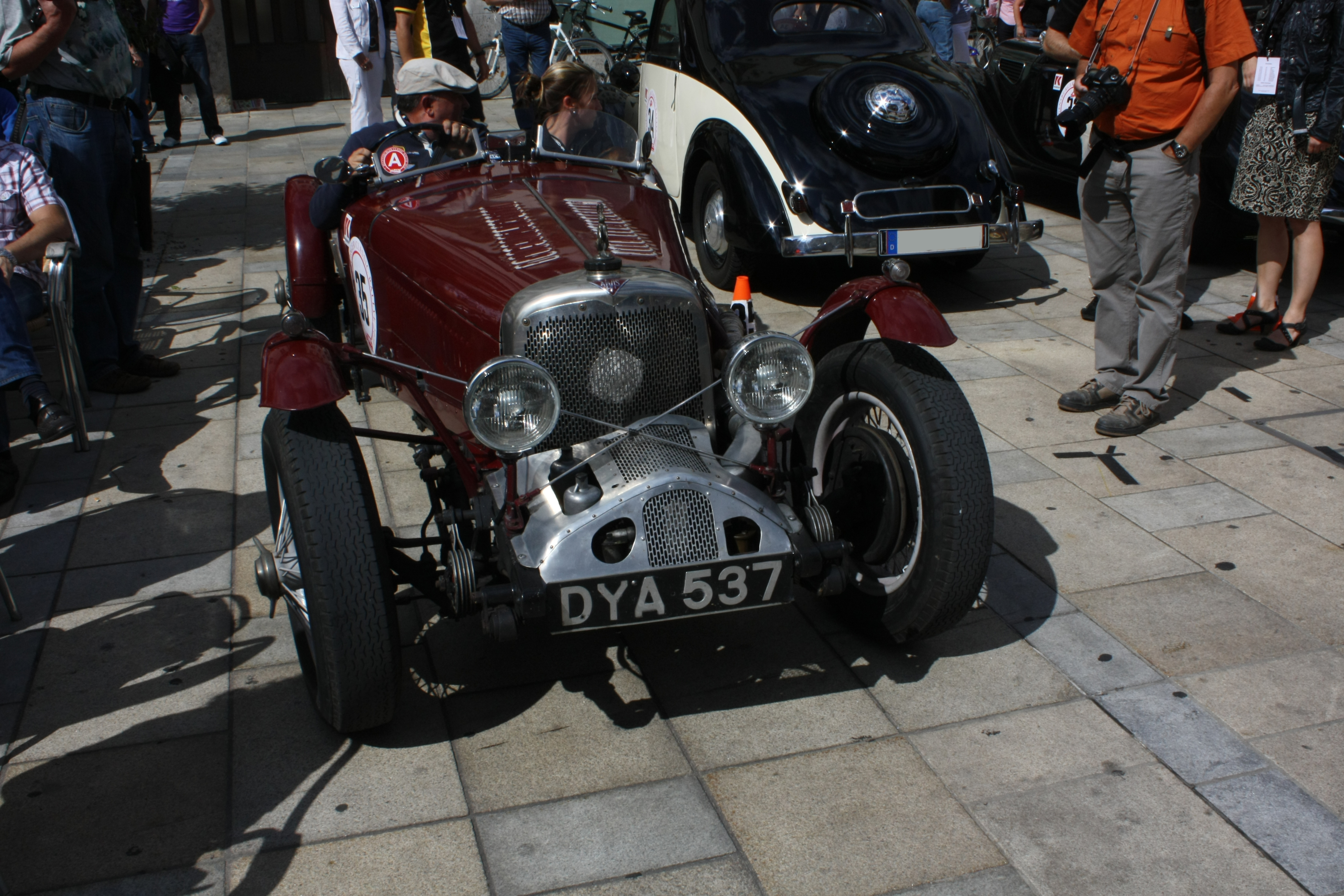
Alvis 12/70

== Alvis aircraft engines ==
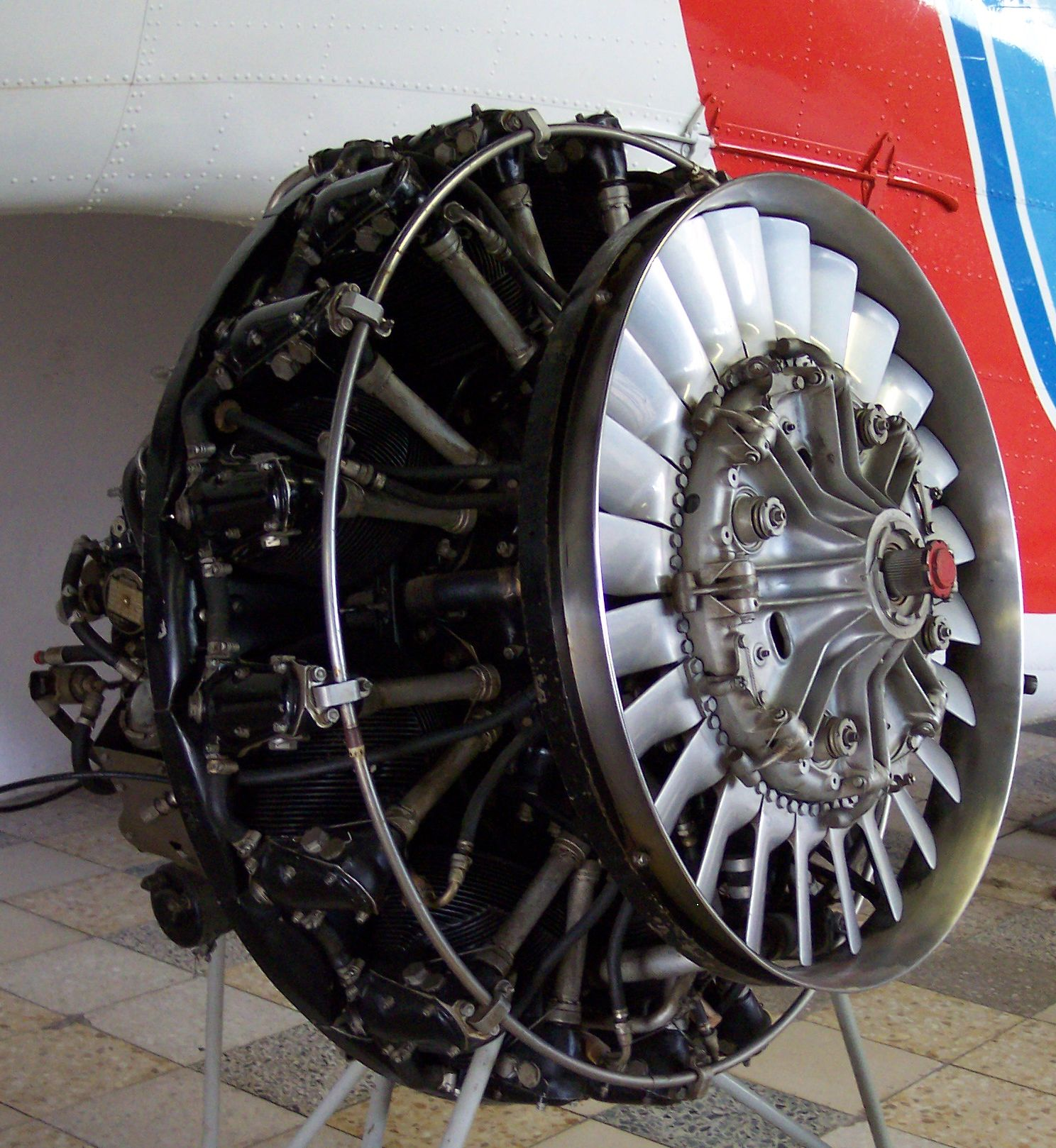
An Alvis Leonides Mk.173 radial engine as fitted to the Bristol Sycamore helicopter. The large cooling fan in front of the cylinders is typical of engines fitted to helicopters.

The initial Alvis aero-engines were licence-built Gnome-Rhone radials. The first aero-engine designed and built by Alvis was the 14-cylinder Alvis Pelides radial in 1936. Development of this and related engines (Pelides Major, Alcides, Alcides Major, Maeonides Major) was stopped with the start of the Second World War with only a handful built.

The Alvis Leonides, a smaller 9-cylinder radial, continued in development during the war and was used after the war in some aircraft and helicopters until production finished in 1966. In 1952, Alvis returned to 14-cylinder radials with a development of the Leonides as the Leonides Major. The Major was used in the Westland Whirlwind helicopter.

== Alvis military vehicles ==
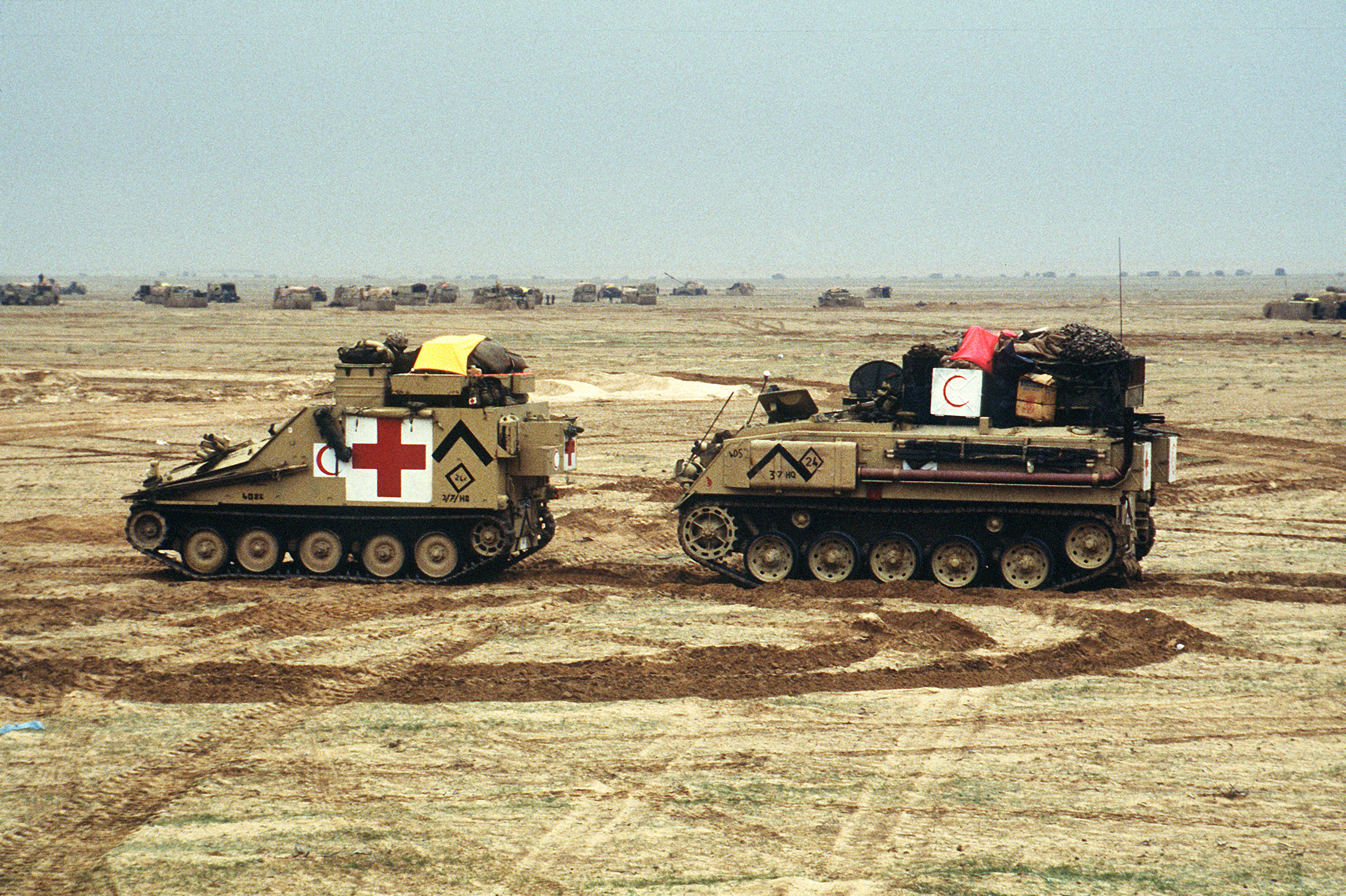
British FV104 Samaritan ambulance and FV432 armoured personnel carrier during the Gulf War

The Hungarian automotive engineer Nicholas Straussler had designed an armoured car (AC1) in 1932, which was built by the Manfred Weiss company under licence in Budapest. When Hungary aligned itself with Germany soon afterwards, Straussler emigrated to England. Straussler's small new company, Straussler Mechanisations Ltd, lacked the necessary resources and capacity to build the vehicle on a large scale, so Straussler approached Alvis, and Alvis-Straussler Ltd, a short-lived joint venture company, was formed in July 1936.

The prototype vehicle produced, the Alvis Straussler AC2, was built upon the AC1 chassis. The first AC3 – the first operational purpose-built armoured car ever produced – was delivered in 1937 by Alvis-Straussler Ltd, built upon the AC2 prototype. Twenty-seven vehicles were built: 12 for the Royal Air Force, 3 for the Portuguese Army, and 12 for the Royal Netherlands East Indies Army. The AC2 was subsequently used as a basis for the 39M Csaba armoured scout car built for the Royal Hungarian Army during the Second World War.

- Alvis-Straussler AC3 armoured car (Alvis-Straussler Ltd., 1937)
- Alvis-Straussler light medium tank (Alvis-Straussler Ltd., 1937)
- Hefty gun tractor (Alvis Mechanisation Ltd., 1937)
- LAC armoured car (Alvis Mechanisation Ltd., 1938)

In 1938 Alvis Mechanisations was formed to take over the obligations of Alvis-Straussler Ltd. In 1938, Alvis produced a prototype armoured light reconnaissance vehicle for comparison trials with other manufacturers. The Alvis Dingo lost out to a design by BSA Cycles but 'Dingo' was adopted as the name for the BSA design; which was built by a BSA subsidiary as the Daimler Dingo.

Post-war, Alvis designed a series of six-wheel drive vehicles. The Saladin (FV601) armoured car and Saracen armoured personnel carrier were first. The Saracen was built as a number of related vehicles including FV604 Regimental Command Vehicle, and FV610 Armoured Command Post. The Salamander was an airfield crash tender. It was subsequently used as a basis for the Stalwart amphibious military truck. The FV611 model was also built to serve as an armoured ambulance.

The FV432 tracked armoured personnel carrier and related vehicles was developed in the early 1960s by GKN Sankey and came under Alvis in 1998.

The Combat Vehicle Reconnaissance (Tracked) family of tracked vehicles were designed in the 1960s. The family includes the FV101 Scorpion, FV102 Striker, FV103 Spartan, FV104 Samaritan, FV105 Sultan, FV106 Samson, FV107 Scimitar, FV4333 Stormer, and the Streaker. The first vehicle of this series was the FV101 Scorpion, which was the first aluminium hull tank ever to be built. The hull and turret are actually fabricated from a welded aluminium-zinc-magnesium alloy. Seventeen Scorpion prototypes were delivered for field testing in February 1969.

=== Alvis military vehicles ===
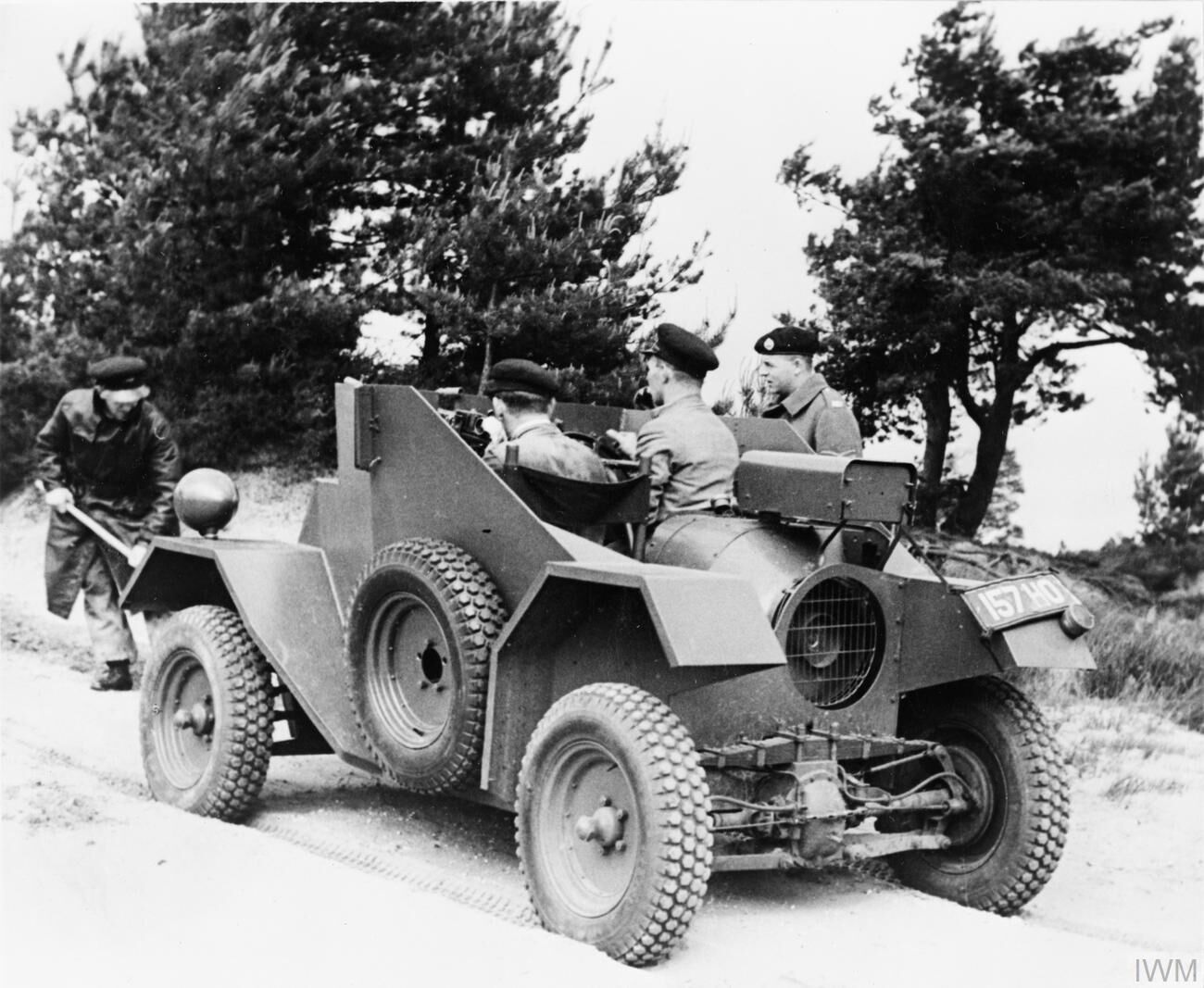
Dingo Scout armoured light reconnaissance vehicle. Not adopted by the British Army which chose a design by BSA instead.

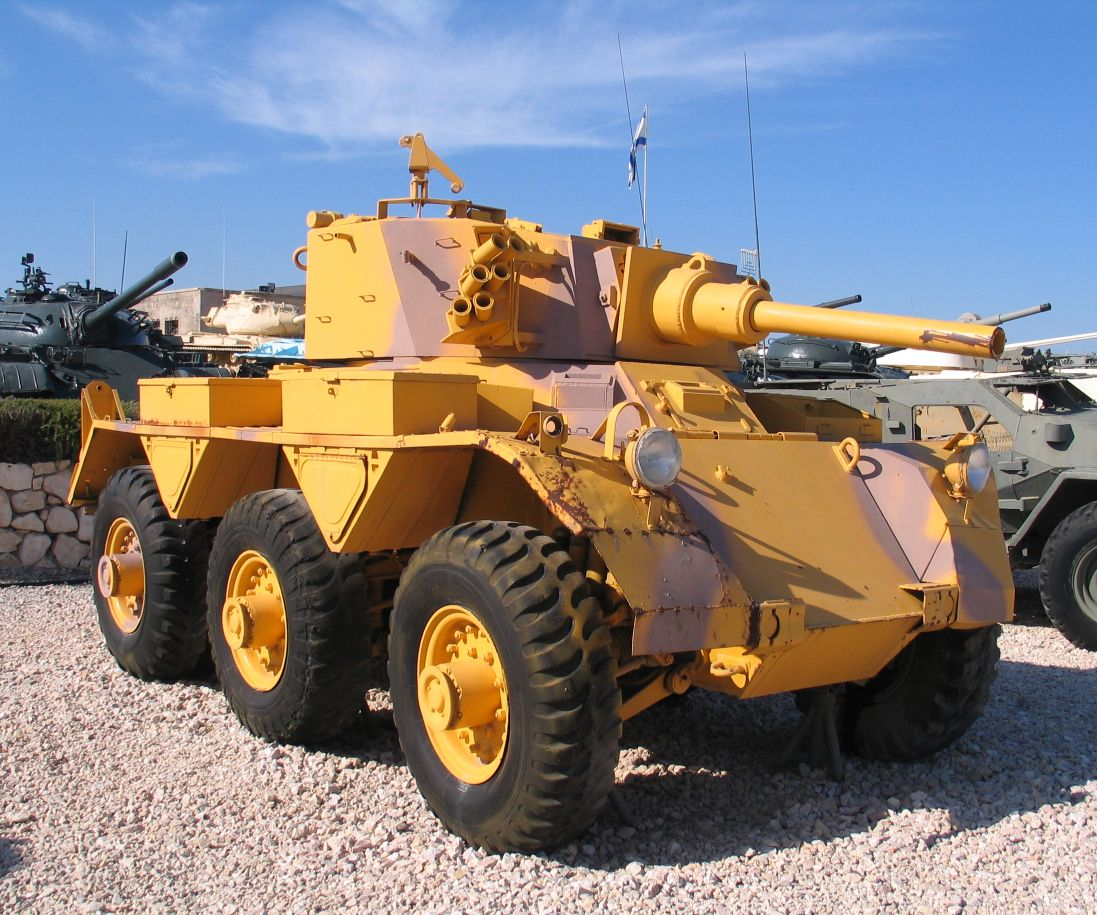
FV601 Saladin armoured car

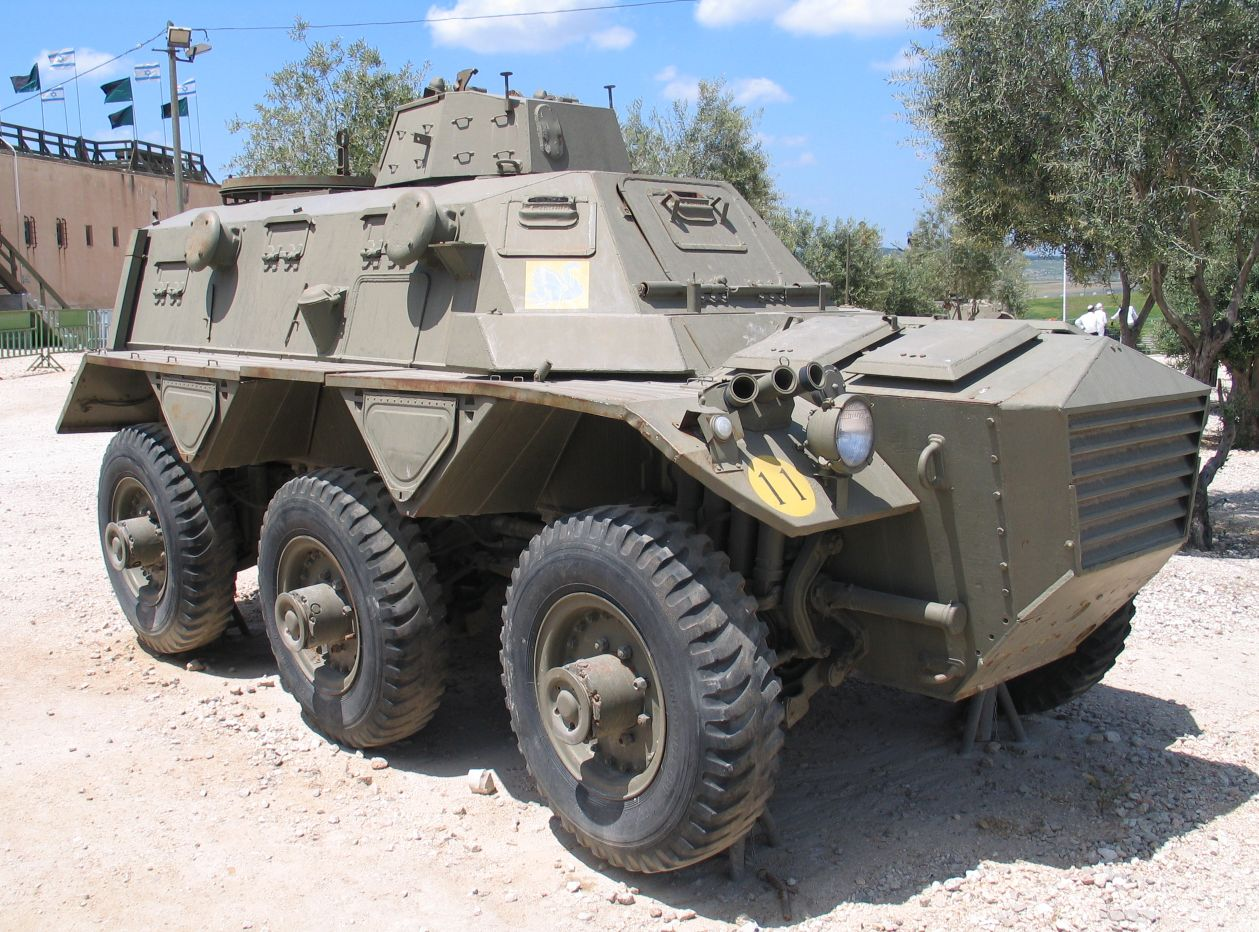
FV603 Saracen armoured personnel carrier

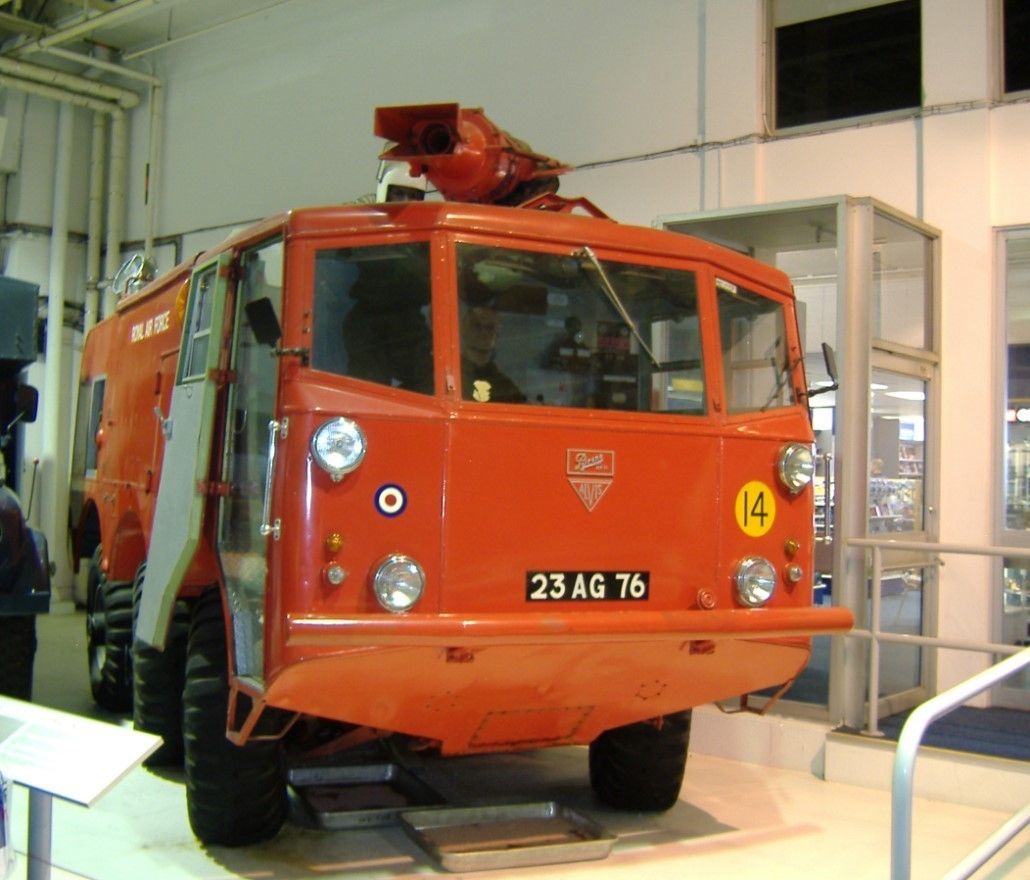
FV652 Salamander airport crash tender at the Royal Air Force Museum London

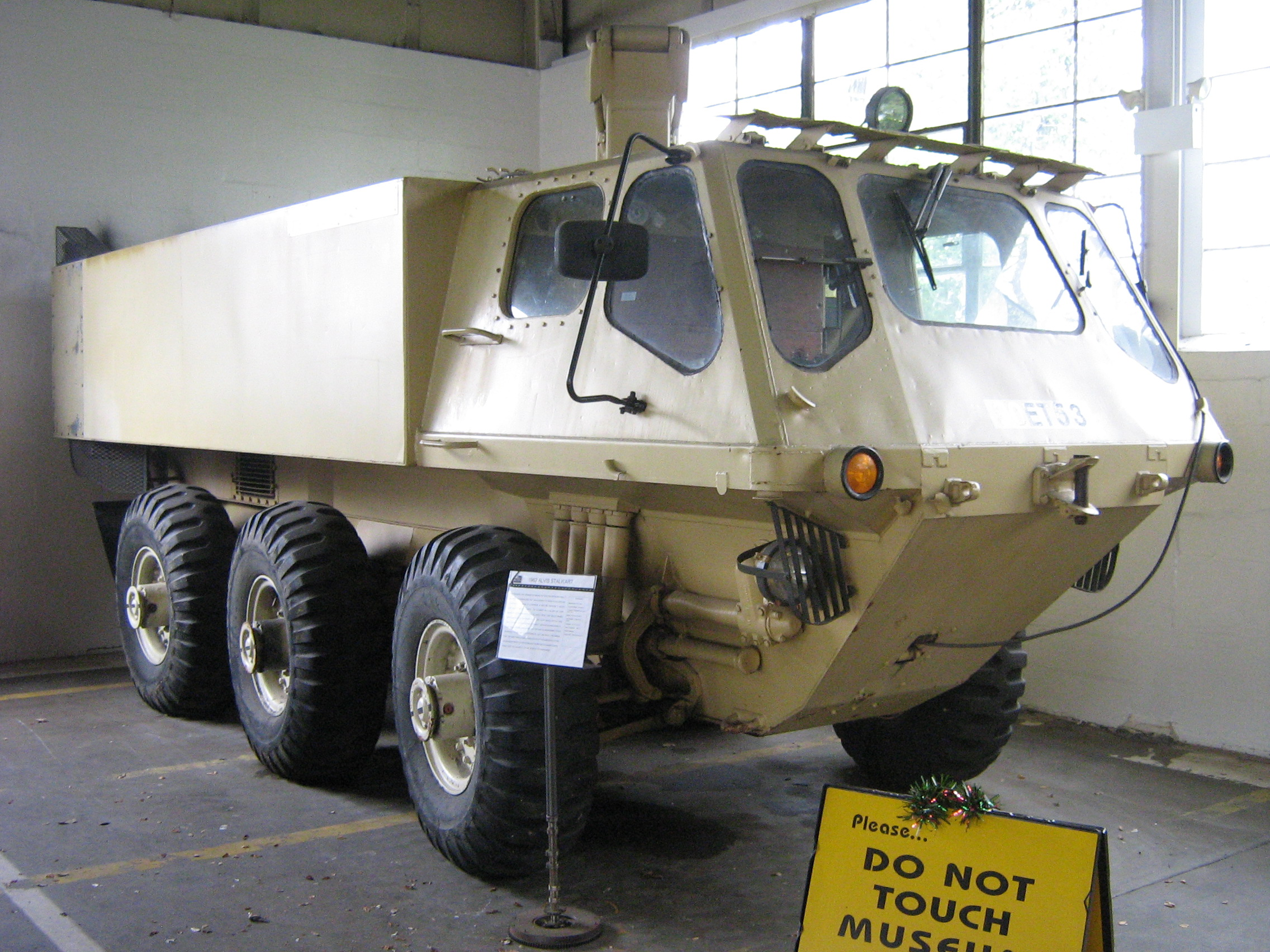
Stalwart cross-country amphibious load carrier

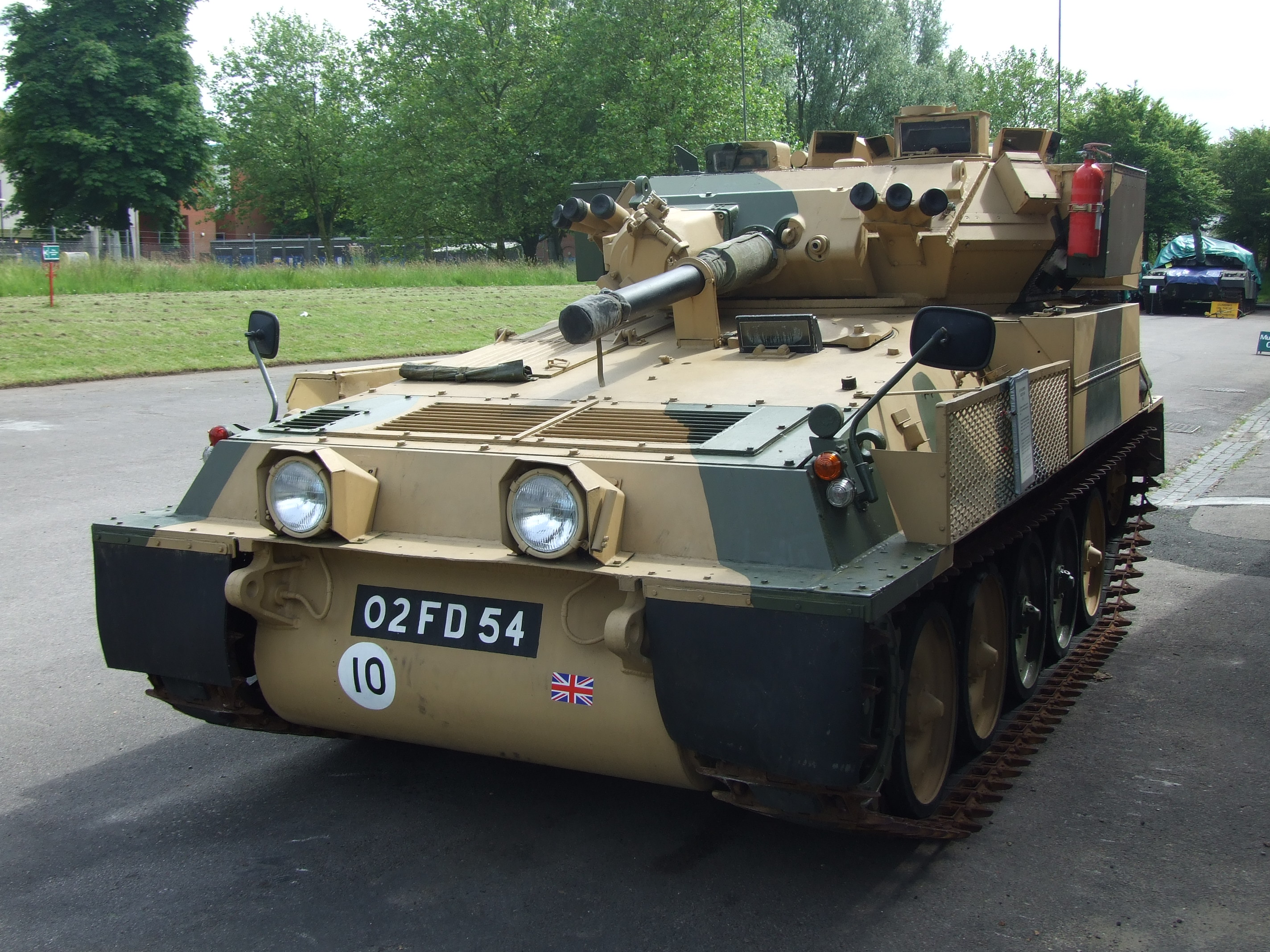
FV101 Scorpion armoured reconnaissance vehicle

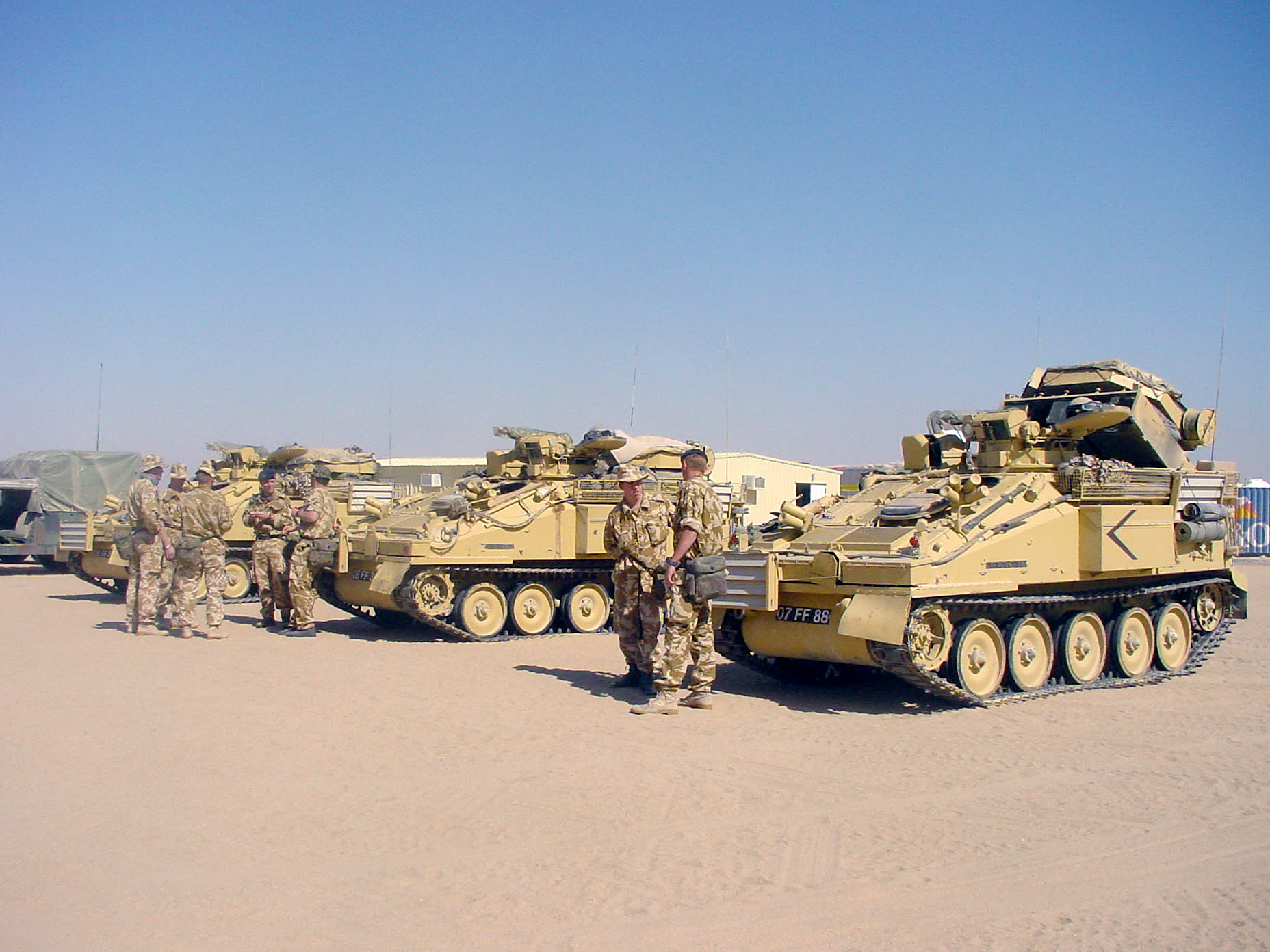
FV102 Striker anti-tank guided missile vehicle

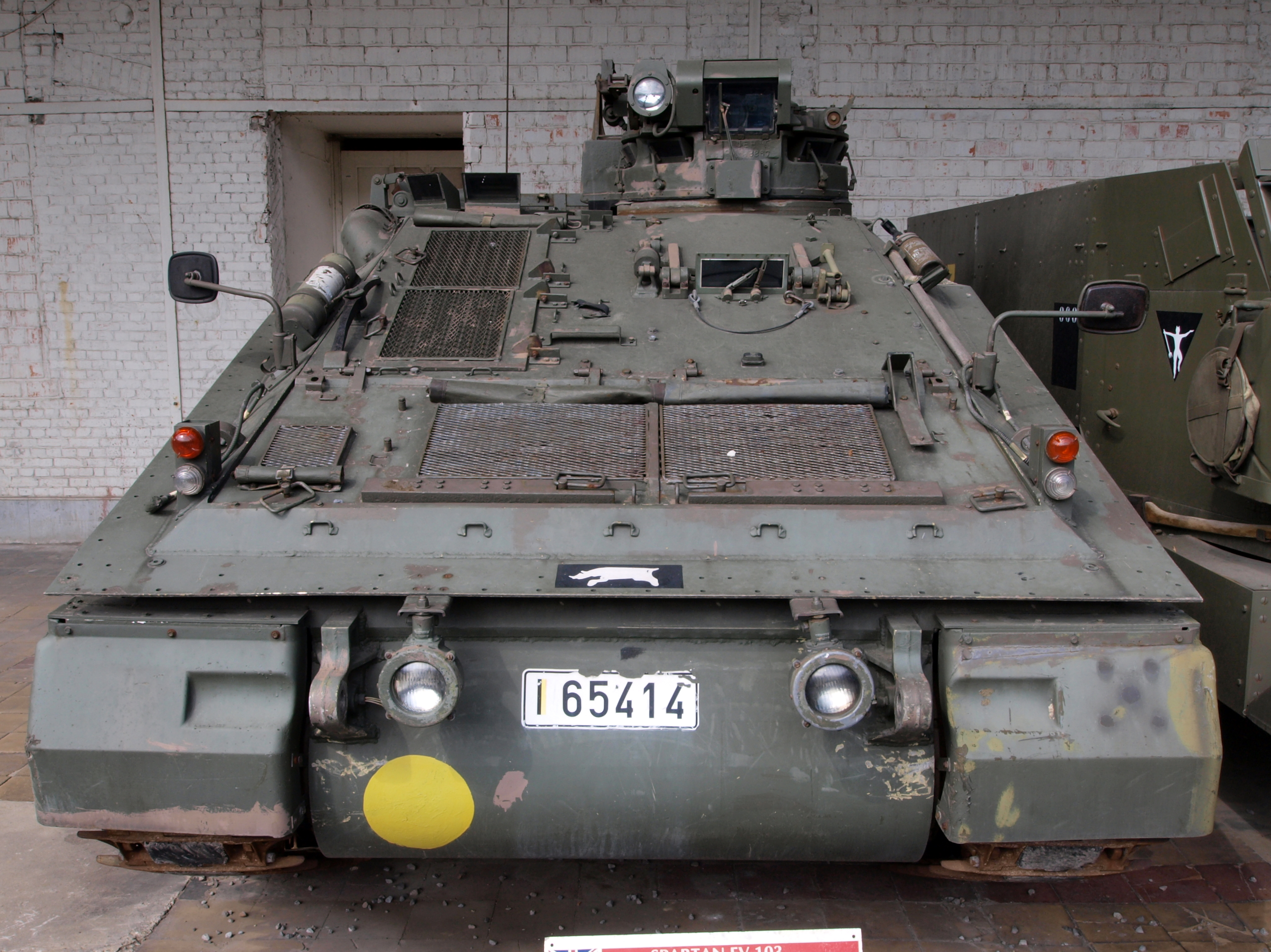
FV103 Spartan armoured personnel carrier

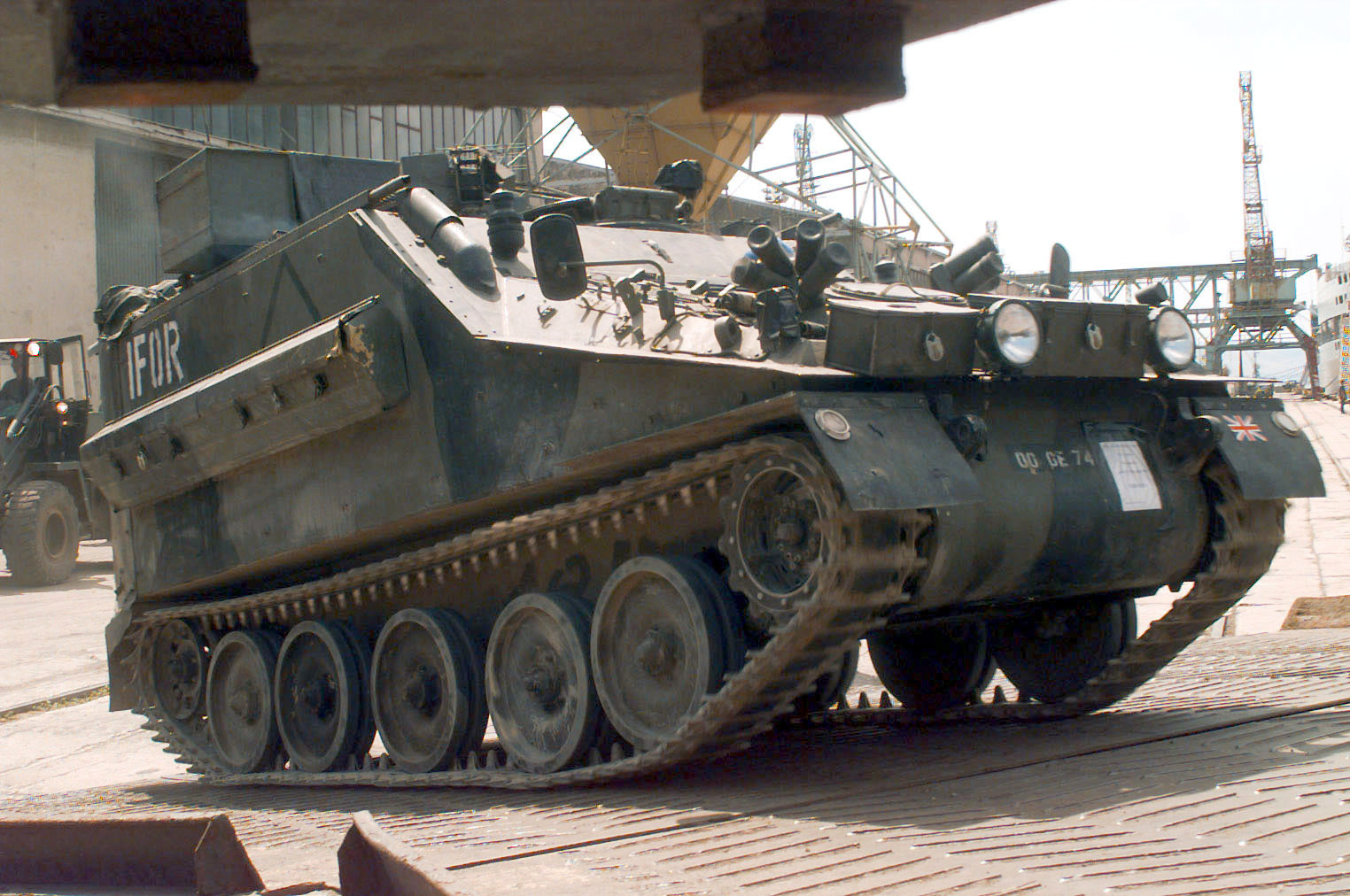
FV105 Sultan armoured command vehicle

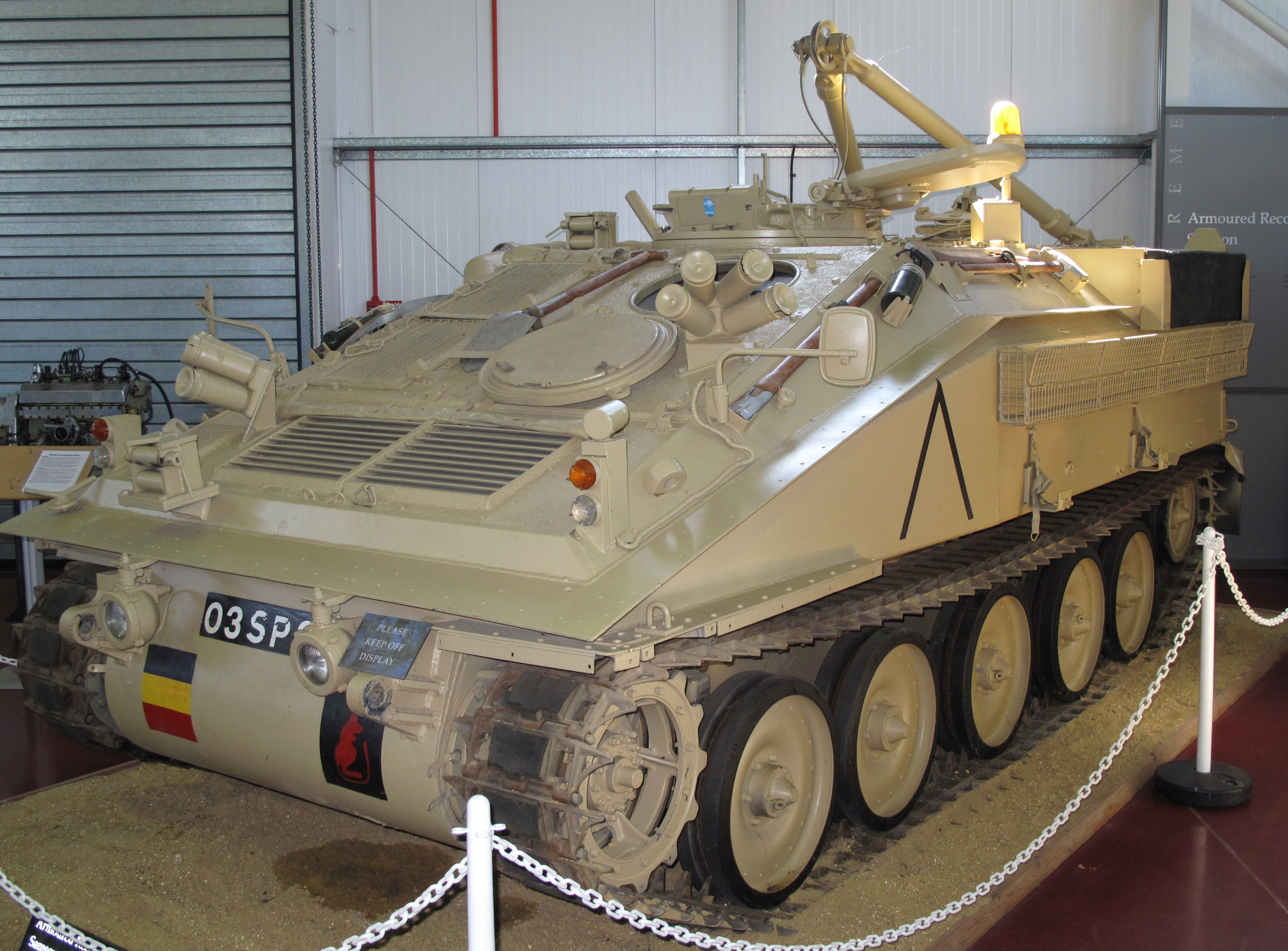
FV106 Samson armoured recovery vehicle

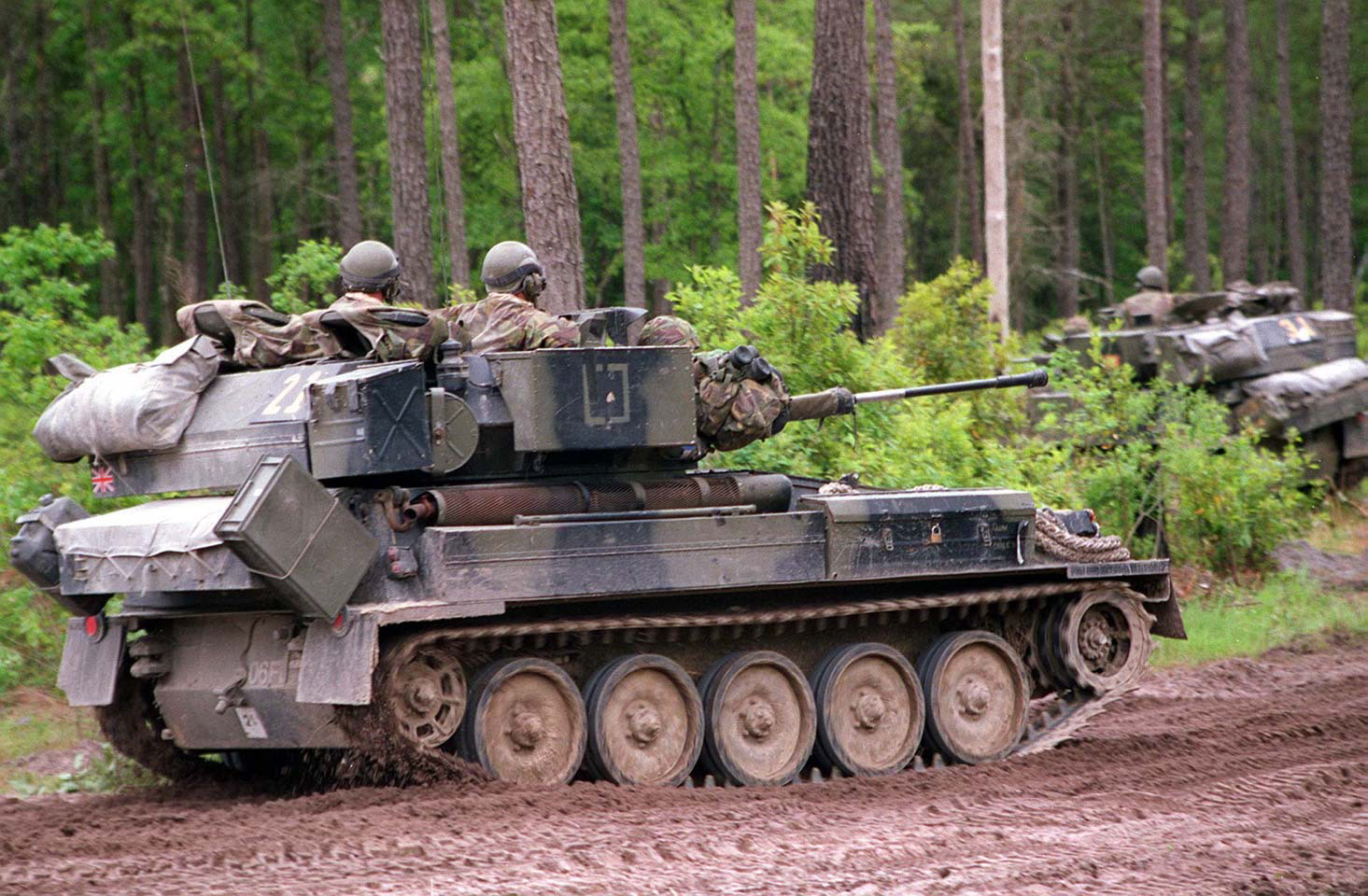
FV107 Scimitar armoured reconnaissance vehicle

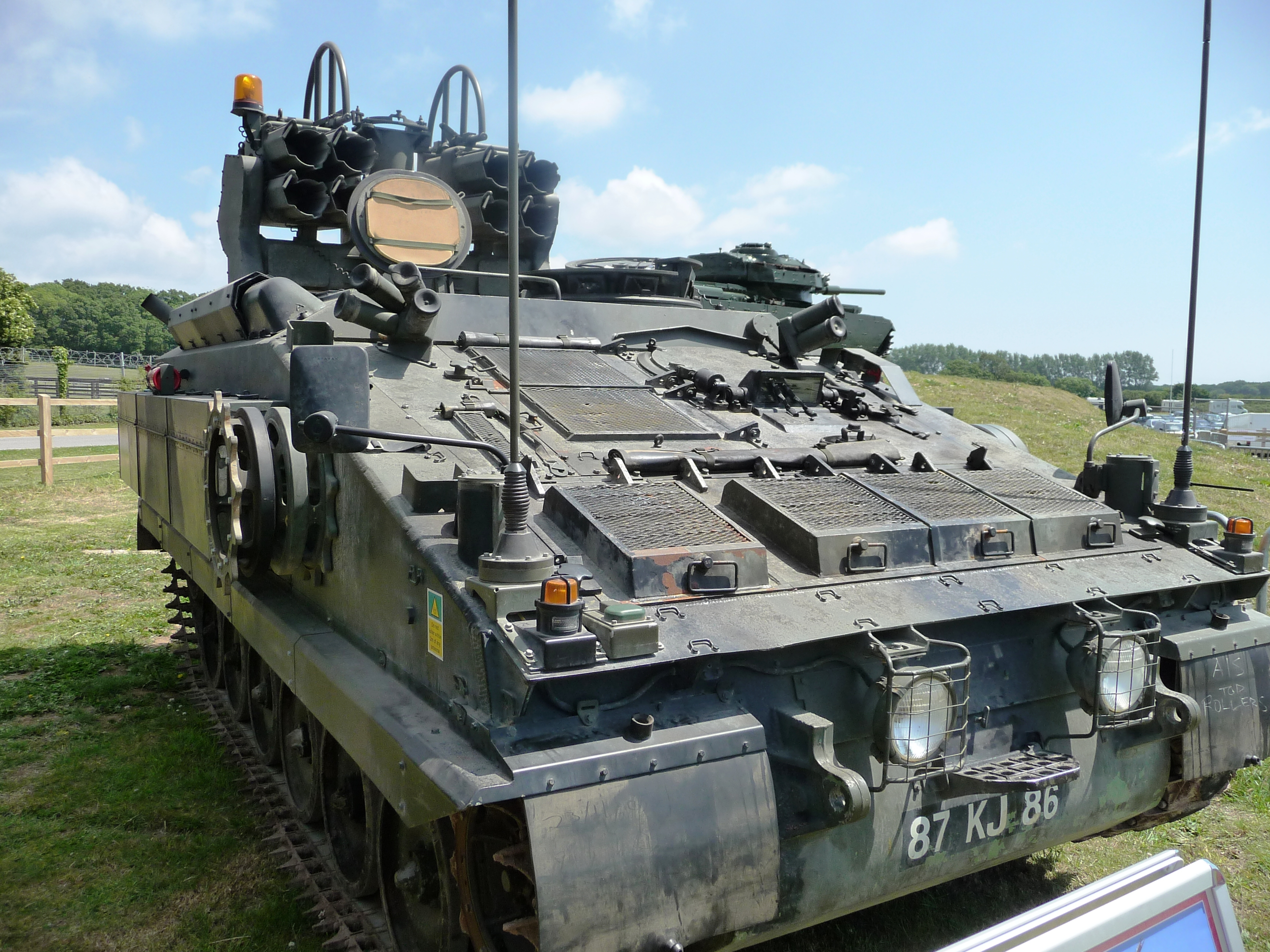
FV4333 Stormer

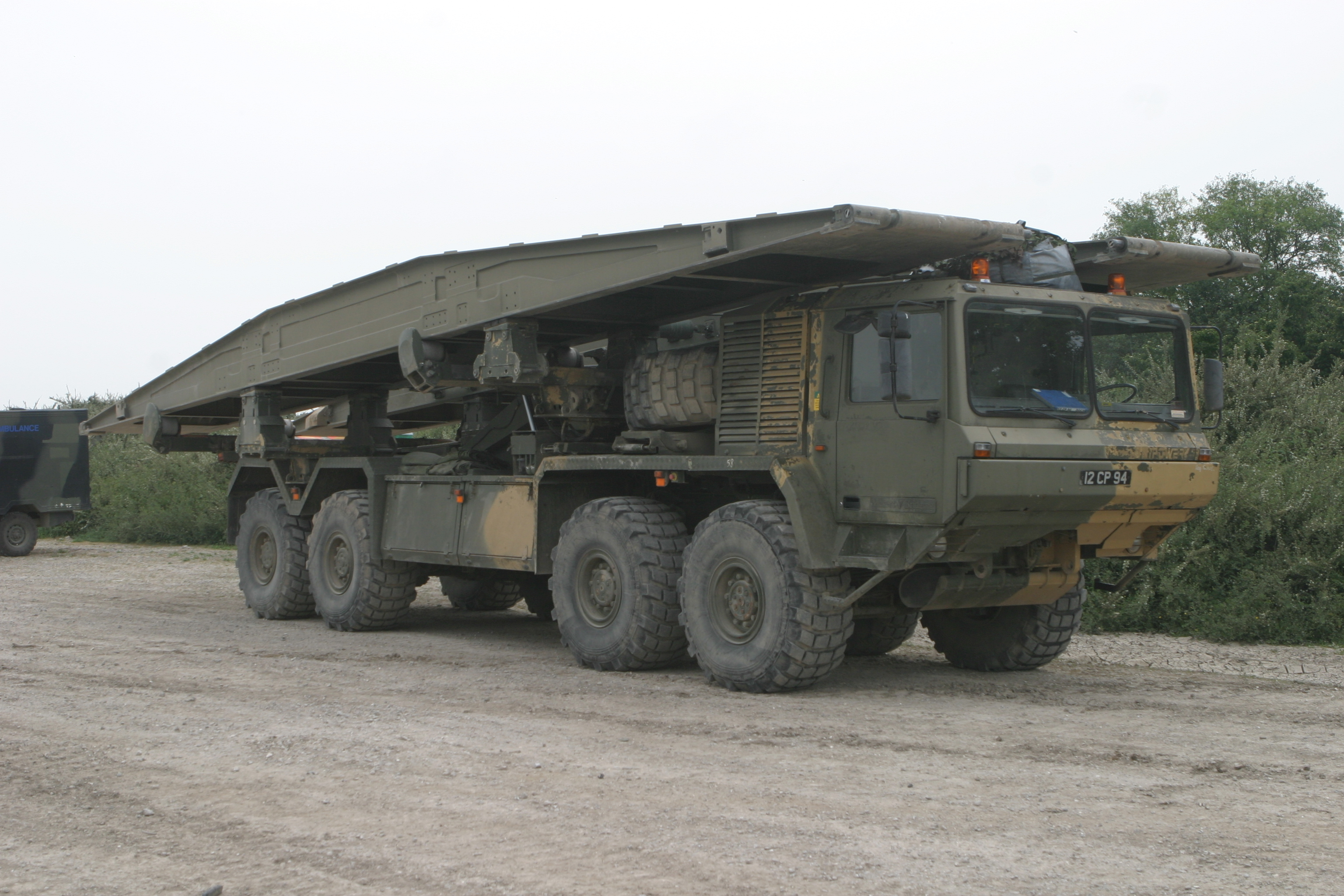
Armoured Vehicle Launched Bridge (AVLB), manufactured by Alvis Unipower Limited

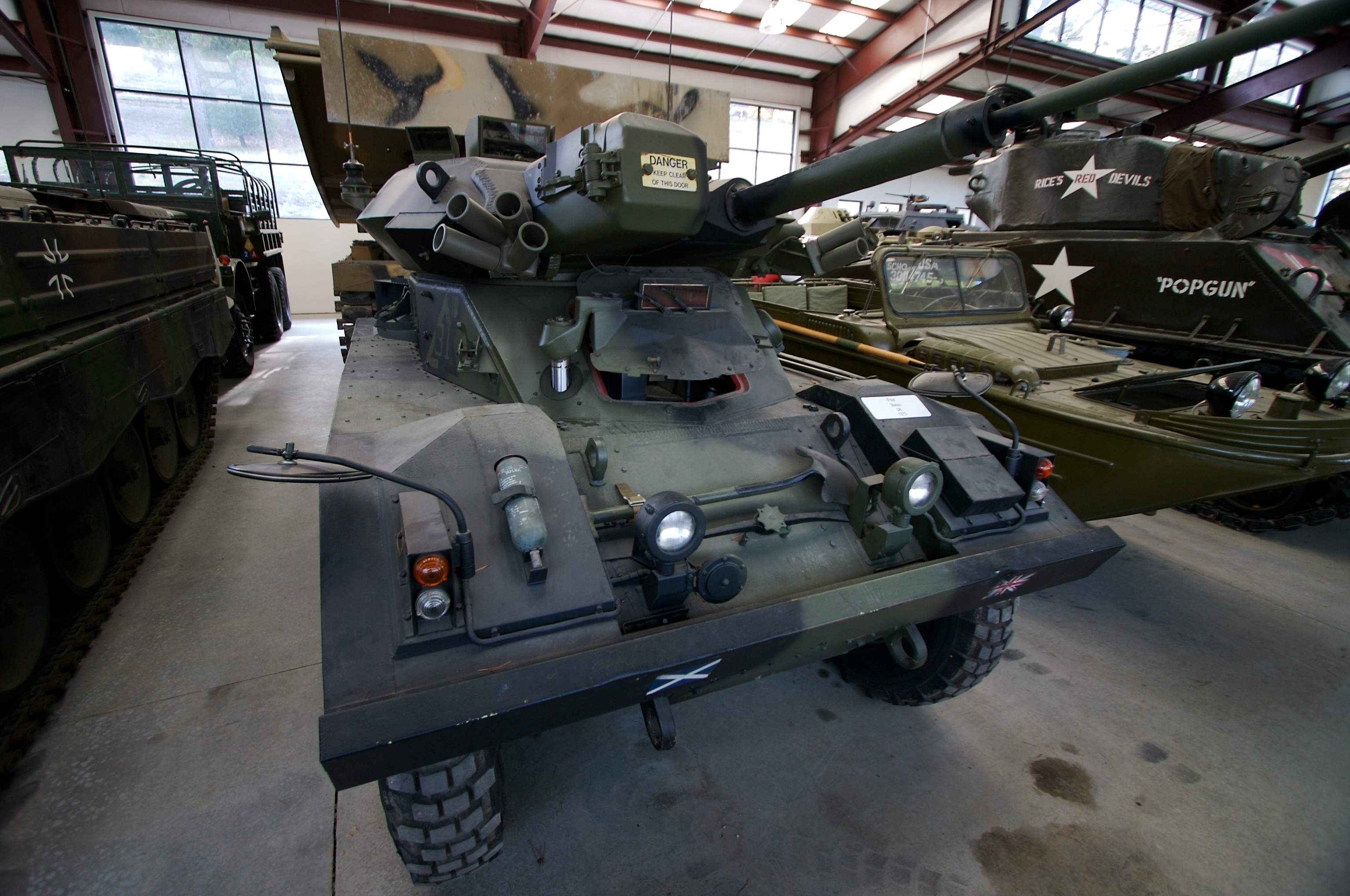
FV721 Fox armoured reconnaissance vehicle

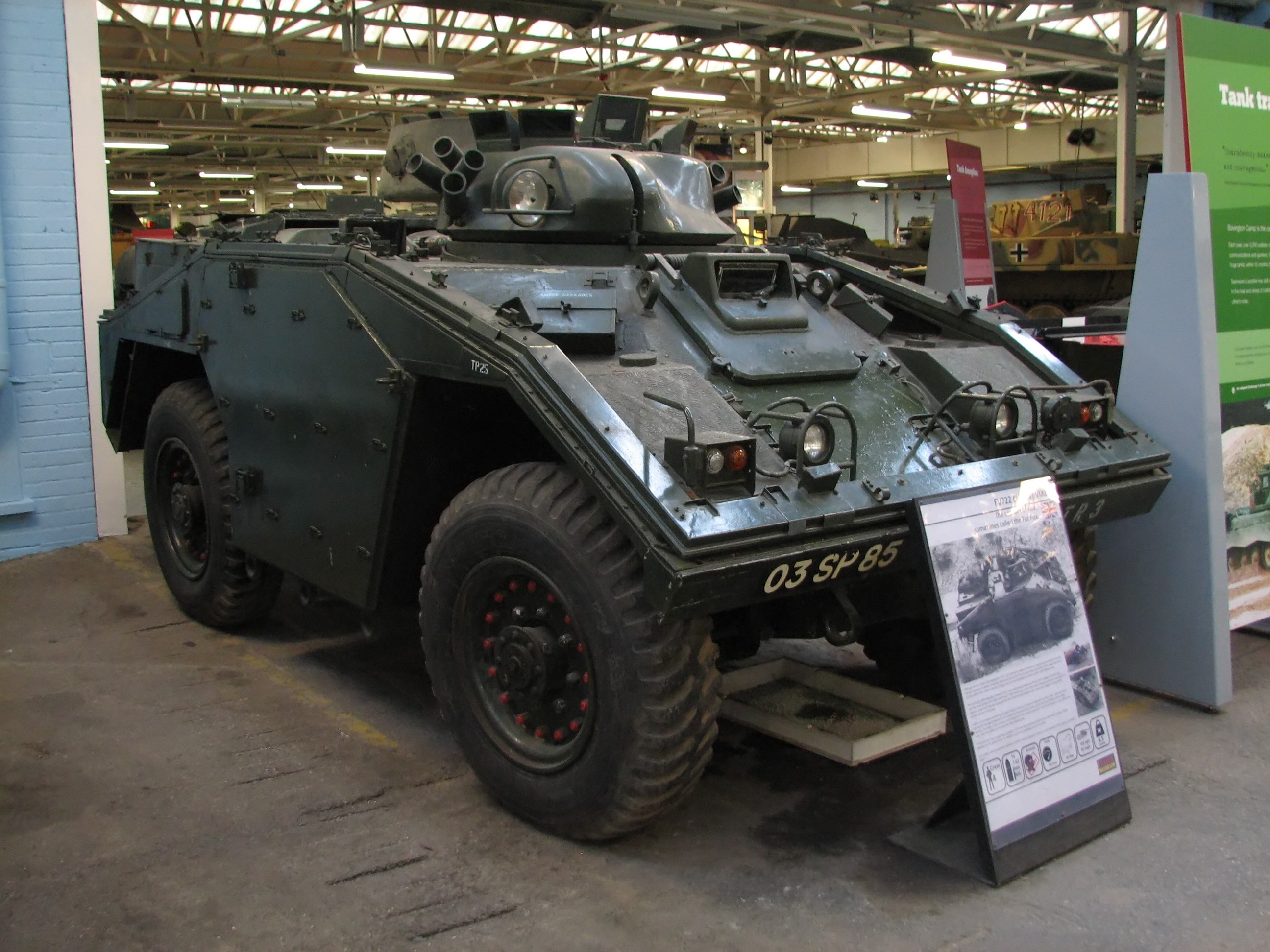
FV722 Vixen armoured reconnaissance vehicle (Wheeled)

== Alvis ownership ==
More than 20 per cent of all Alvis cars ever manufactured were still in existence in 1989. The Alvis Owner Club, founded in 1951, is a club for all Alvis car and military vehicle enthusiasts. It has over 1,300 members. It hosts International Weekends annually, where owners from the UK and overseas display their cars.

The Alvis Register is a club with more than 600 members, dedicated to all things related to vintage Alvis motor cars (1920–1932). Members can access technical and historical information and share their interest with other Alvis enthusiasts. Most owners retain an eligible car or cars.

== See also ==
- List of car manufacturers of the United Kingdom
- List of aircraft engine manufacturers
