= Alvis Crested Eagle =

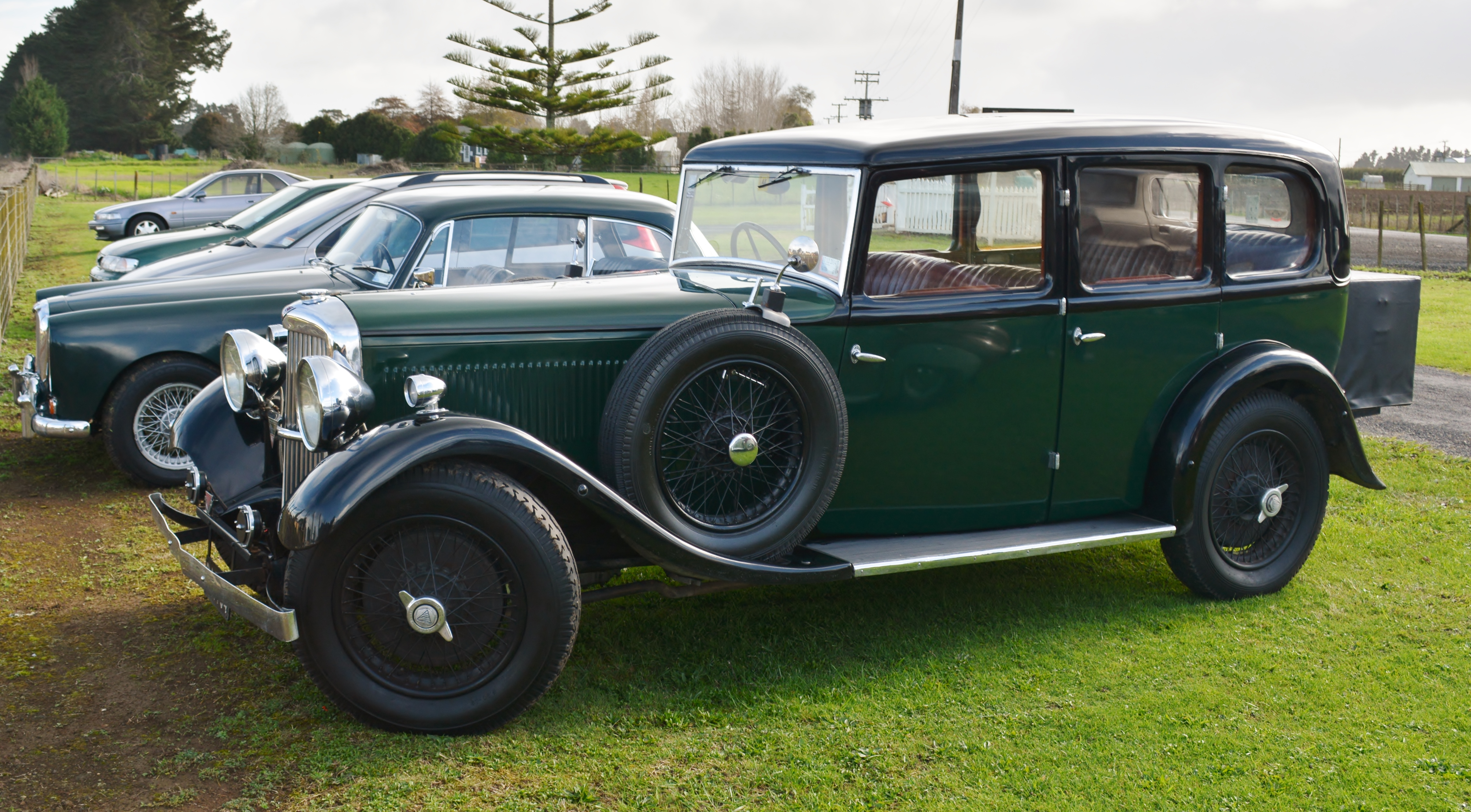
1934 Alvis Crested Eagle (6-light saloon body by Charlesworth)

The Alvis Crested Eagle is a passenger car series from the English car manufacturer Alvis. A total of 602 vehicles were manufactured between 1933 and 1940, with model codes running from TA to TF, TJ and TK.

== Common features across the series ==
Common to all cars is a water-cooled six-cylinder in-line engine with overhead valves; it was installed behind the front axle on a chassis frame driving a rigid rear axle suspended on semi-elliptical longitudinal leaf springs. Common to all vehicles and advanced for the time is the use of a front independent wheel suspension with a semi-elliptical transverse leaf spring, which Alvis introduced in parallel in 1933 for the Crested Eagle and Speed 20 SB models. All variants have a uniform track width of 1422 mm, as introduced in 1932 with the Speed 20 SA and later also used in the Speed 25, Alvis 4.3 litre and the Silver Crest models.

All Crested Eagle models were available from the factory in two versions, as a four-door saloon (primarily for the self-driving owner) or as a limousine (primarily for chauffeur service). These had six side windows. The latter usually has a longer wheelbase of 3353 mm, the former mostly a shorter one of 3124 mm.

As was customary in the company, Alvis had all bodies manufactured externally, the "saloons" regularly at the coachbuilder Charlesworth Bodies, the "limousines" at Mayfair Carriage Co. In addition, customers could also purchase their Crested Eagle as a pure rolling chassis with all drive components, but without body and interior fittings, in order to have it individually clad by a body builder of their choice. Special bodies from at least eleven different coachbuilders are known, including four-seater tourers from REAL (R. E. Alltman Ltd.), two-door convertibles from Vanden Plas, Cross & Ellis, Carlton and Charlesworth, and other one-offs from Martin & King, Samuel Holbrook Ltd., Salmons and Son and Mayfair.

== Individual model variants ==
The Alvis Crested Eagle was available in various versions, which differ primarily in their year of origin, the engine variant and the wheelbase. As a chauffeur limousine or as a 6-light saloon with a total of six side windows and a wheelbase of well over three meters, certain of the model series have been considered 'upper' or even 'luxury' class. On the other hand, the entry-level variant had a smaller six-cylinder engine and was a car for the middle classes. The source situation for individual models' technical details and their production periods is sometimes unclear and even contradictory.

== Sources ==
- David Culshaw, Peter Horrobin: The Complete Catalogue of British Cars 1895–1975. Veloce Publishing, Dorchester 1997, ISBN 1-874105-93-6, Pp. 35–40.
- Day, Kenneth (1989). Iles, Robert (ed.). Alvis: The Story of the Red Triangle (2nd ed.). Haynes Publishing Group. ISBN 978-0-85429-667-5.
- The Times, Wednesday, 22 October 1930; p. 10; Issue 45650
- The Times, Tuesday, 25 August 1931; p. 10; Issue 45910
