= Alvis Speed 25 =

Alvis 4.3-litre
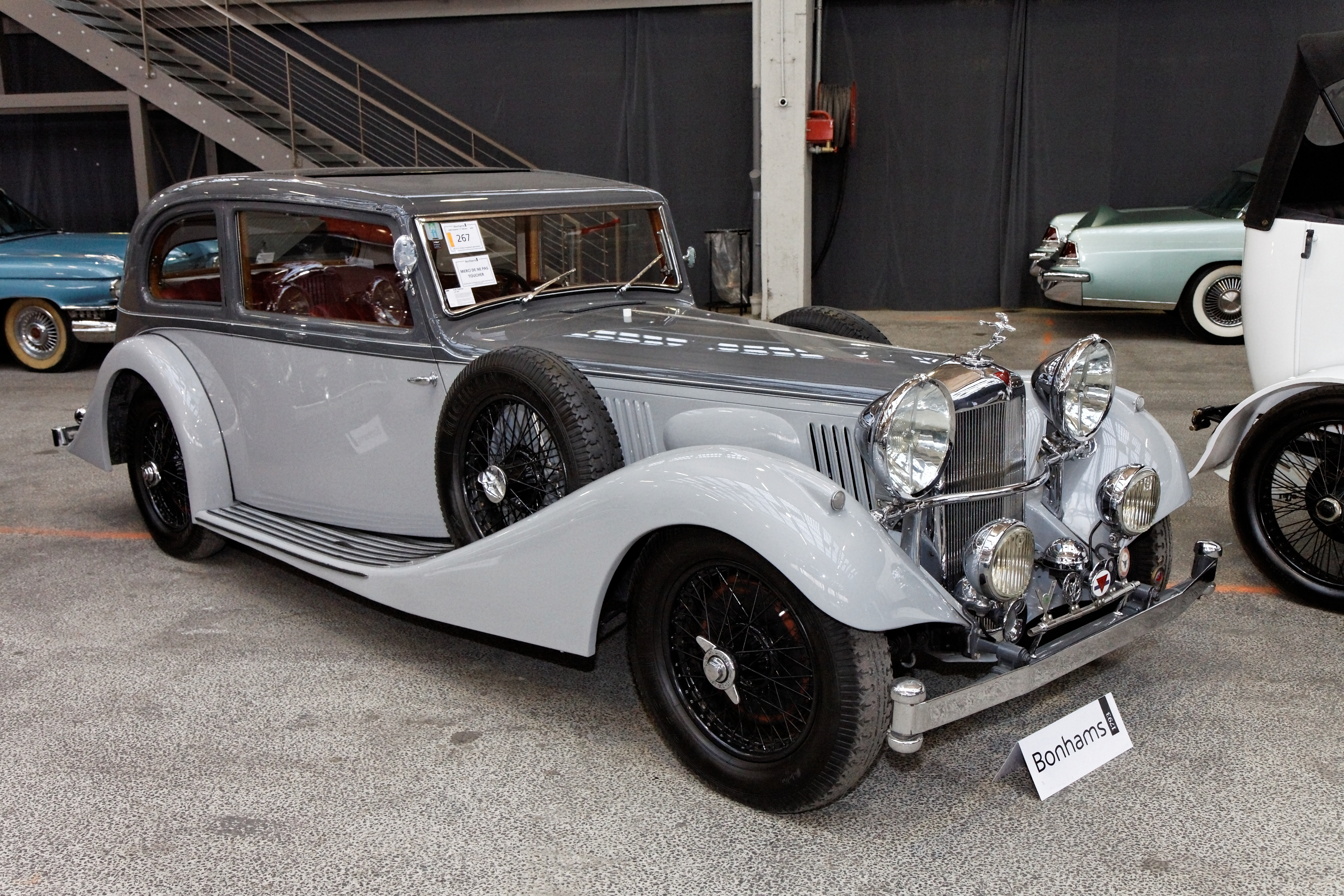
- Sports coupé by Mayfair Carriage Co 1937

Overview
- Manufacturer: Alvis
- Production: 198 built
- Model years: 1937 to 1940

Body and chassis
- Class: Full-size luxury car (F)
- Body style: 4-door sports saloon; chassis only also supplied
- Layout: front-engine, rear-wheel-drive
- Related: Alvis Speed 25 3.5-litre

Powertrain
- Engine: 4,387 cc (268 cu in), 92 x 110 mm; Straight-6, Petrol; 137 bhp (102 kW) @3,600 rpm; 31.48 tax horsepower
- Transmission: single plate clutch, separate 4-speed gearbox all-silent and all-synchromesh, centre change lever, open tubular propeller shaft with metal joints (arranged in a straight line), spiral bevel fully floating back axle

Dimensions
- Wheelbase: 127 in (3,226 mm); track 56 in (1,422 mm)
- Length: 191 in (4,900 mm)
- Width: 70 in (1,800 mm)
- Kerb weight: 4,144 lb (1,880 kg)

Alvis Speed 25 3,5-litre
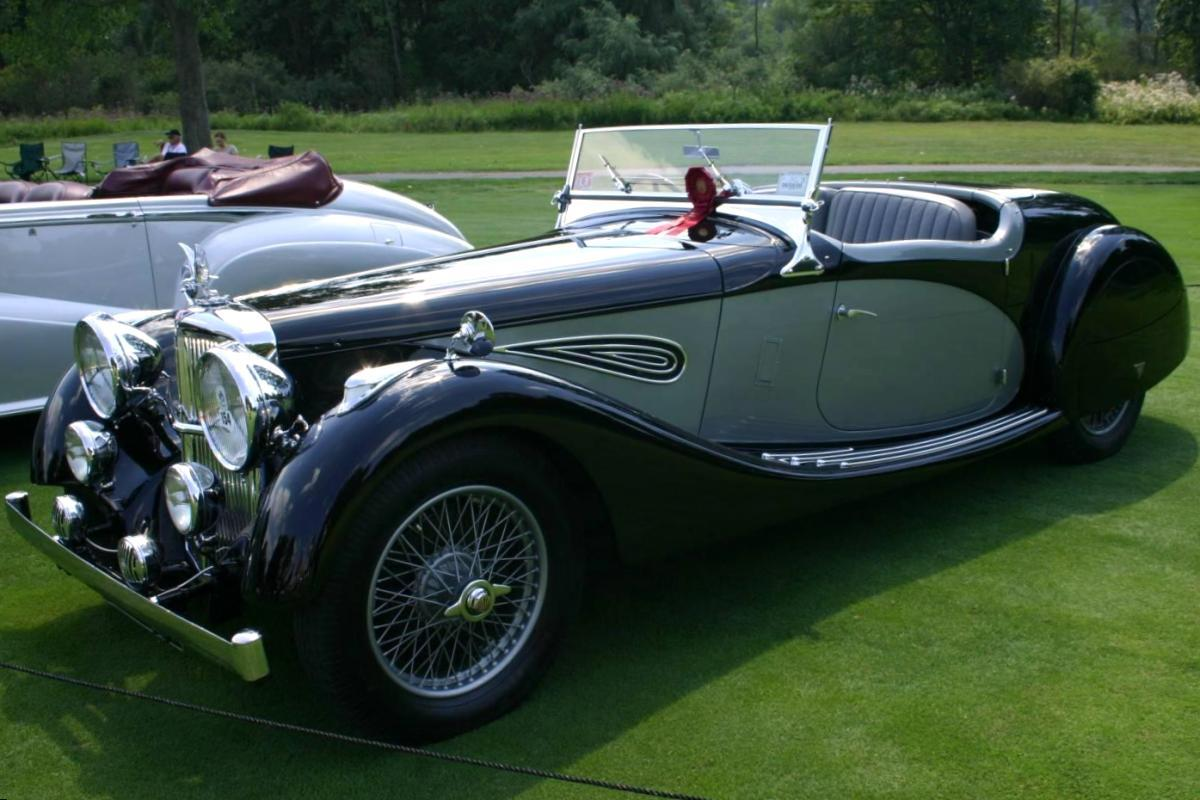
- open two-seater by Offord & Sons 1937

Overview
- Manufacturer: Alvis
- Production: 1937–40

Body and chassis
- Class: Full-size luxury car (F)
- Body style: 4-door sports saloon; 4-seater drop head coupé; sports 4-seater; chassis for bespoke body

Powertrain
- Engine: 3,571 cc (218 cu in) 83 x 110 mm; Straight-6 Petrol; 106 bhp (79 kW) @3,800 rpm; 25.63 tax horsepower
- Transmission: single plate clutch, separate 4-speed gearbox all-silent and all-synchromesh, centre change lever, open tubular propeller shaft with metal joints (arranged in a straight line), spiral bevel fully floating back axle

Dimensions
- Wheelbase: 123 in (3,124 mm); track 56 in (1,422 mm)
- Length: 190 in (4,800 mm)
- Width: 70 in (1,800 mm)
- Kerb weight: 4,088 lb (1,854 kg)

Chronology
- Predecessor: Alvis Speed 20 3.5-litre

The Alvis 4.3-litre and Alvis Speed 25 were British luxury touring cars announced in August 1936 and made until 1940 by Alvis Car and Engineering Company in Coventry. They replaced the Alvis Speed 20 2.8-litre and 3.5-litre.

== New engines ==
The Speed Twenty’s 2.5-litre, 2.8-litre or 3.5-litre engines with four main bearings were replaced in the 4.3-litre and 3.5-litre Speed Twenty-Five with a strengthened newly designed six-cylinder in-line unit now with seven main bearings.

For the 3.5-litre version an output of 110 PS (81 kW) at 3,800 rpm was claimed (and proven) along with a top speed of almost 160 km/h (100 mph). It propelled the occupants at high speed in exceptional luxury accompanied by the attractive sound of a powerful deep and throaty exhaust. Its beauty is also confirmed as it is the only car to win the prestigious Ladies Choice VSCC Oxford Concours prize two years in a row.

The clutch, flywheel and crankshaft were balanced together, which minimised vibration. The cylinder head was of cast iron but the pistons were of aluminium. Two electric petrol pumps fed the three SU carburettors, which were protected by a substantial air filter. A new induction system incorporated an efficient silencing device.

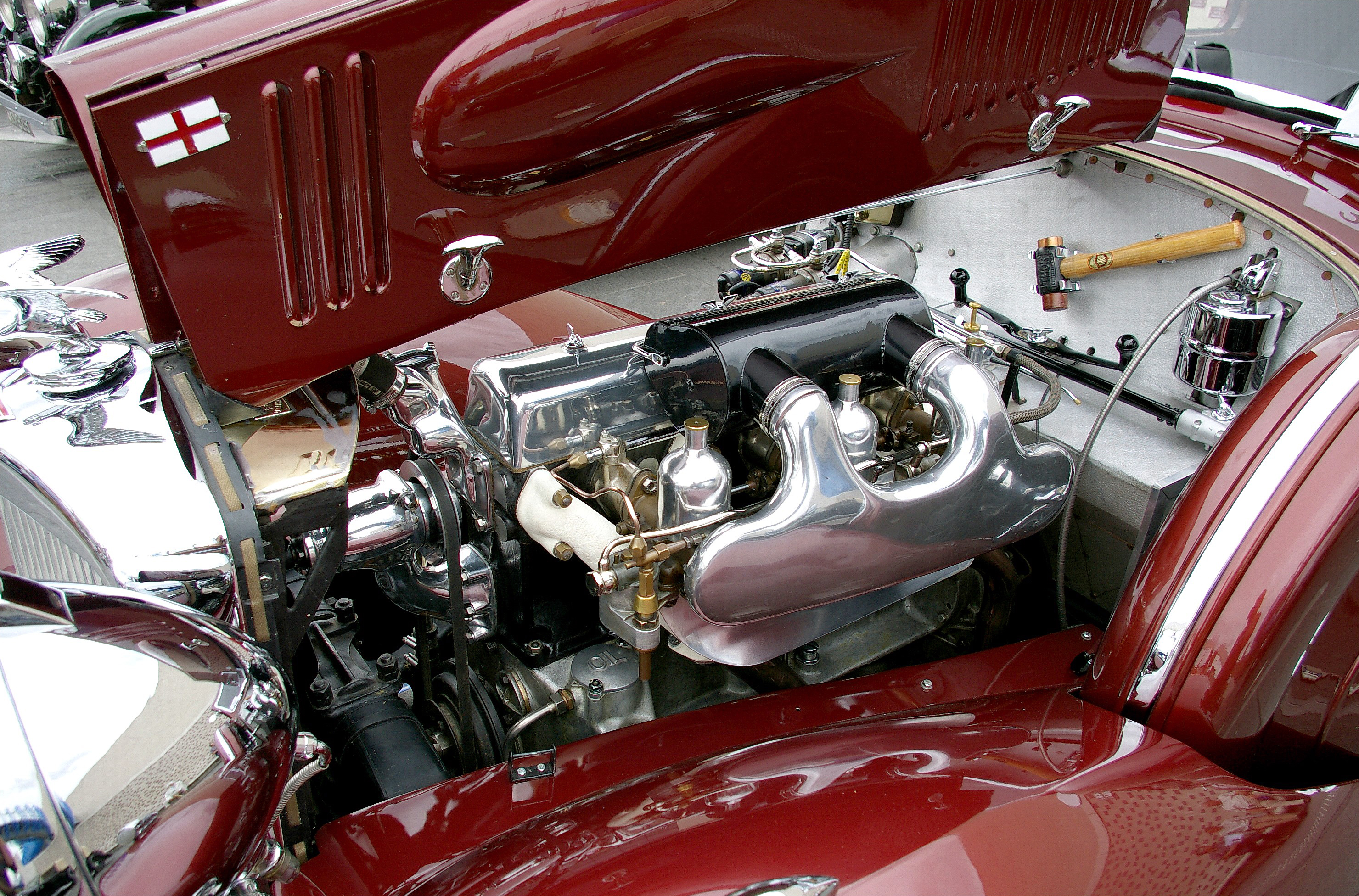
Speed 25 engine 1939 showing new induction system and special hammer for knock-off hubs

== Chassis ==
The leaf springs at the rear were 15 inches (38 cm) longer than on the previous model. The brakes had servo assistance.

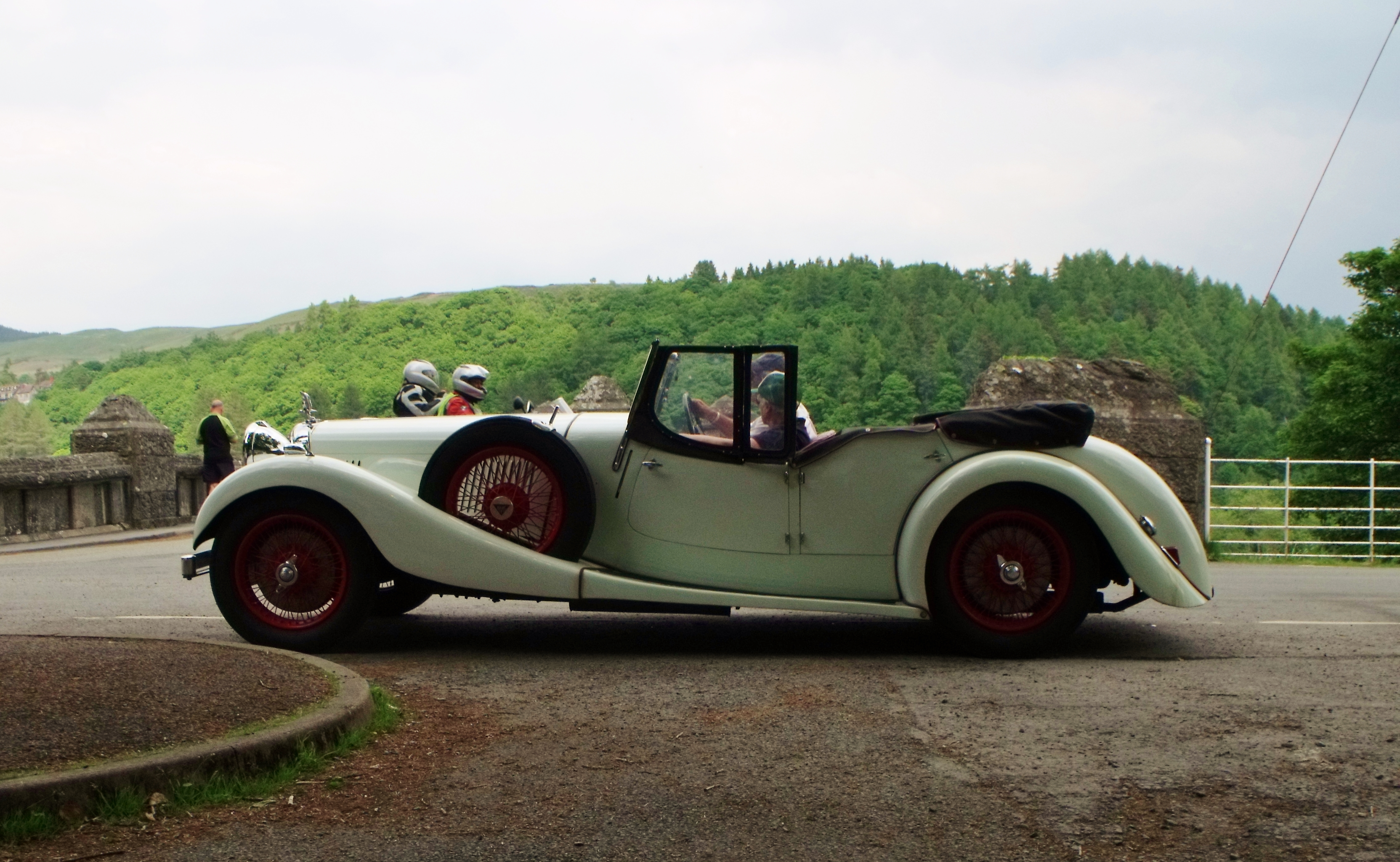
4.3-litre 4-door Tourer by Vanden Plas

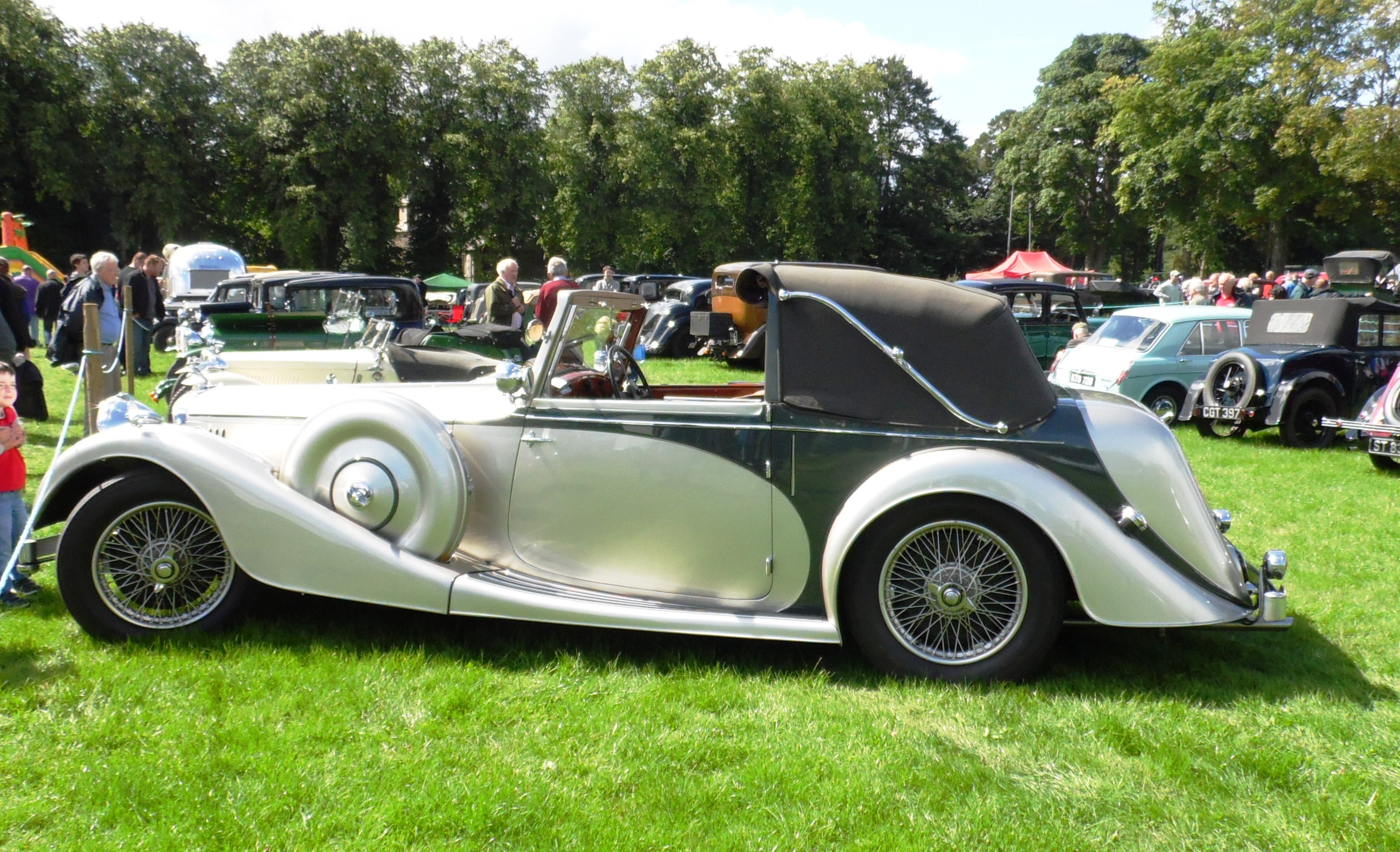
Profile: 1938 Drophead Coupé by Charlesworth

== Coachwork ==
Alvis did not make any of the bodies for the Speed 25. The cars were supplied in chassis form and firms such as Cross & Ellis (standard tourer) Charlesworth (standard saloon and Drop Head Coupé) as well as Vanden Plas, Lancefield, Offord and others would fit open touring or saloon car bodies. The car was built on a heavy steel chassis with a substantial cross brace. With its sporty low slung aspect, all-synchro gearbox, independent front suspension and servo-assisted brakes, this was a fast, reliable and beautifully made car, although at almost £1000 it was not cheap. The survival rate for what was after all a hand-built car is surprisingly good. Later models featured increased chassis boxing, and to reduce the car’s weight Alvis cut numerous holes in the chassis box sections, which was also a solution tried less successfully earlier in the decade by Mercedes-Benz when confronting the same challenge with their enormously heavy Mercedes-Benz SSKL.

Minor improvements

Minor improvements to both cars announced at the October 1938 Motor Show included a dual exhaust system said to quieten the engine and improve power output.

From the show the press reported the 4.3-litre four-door sports saloon to have "a most imposing front with very large headlamps, fog and pass lights, and post horns."

A chassis for bespoke bodywork was still listed but a range of standard coachwork was made available. On the standard four-door saloon there were no running boards and the wings were streamlined. The luggage locker was lined in white rubber. Dunlopillo upholstery eased muscular fatigue. The rake of both the driver's seat and its squab were now easily adjustable. There was a system of no-draught ventilation. The double sliding roof might be opened from either back or front seat. There were twin tuned electric horns and twin electric windscreen wipers. The instrument panel included a revolution counter and there were ashtrays and a smoker's companion.

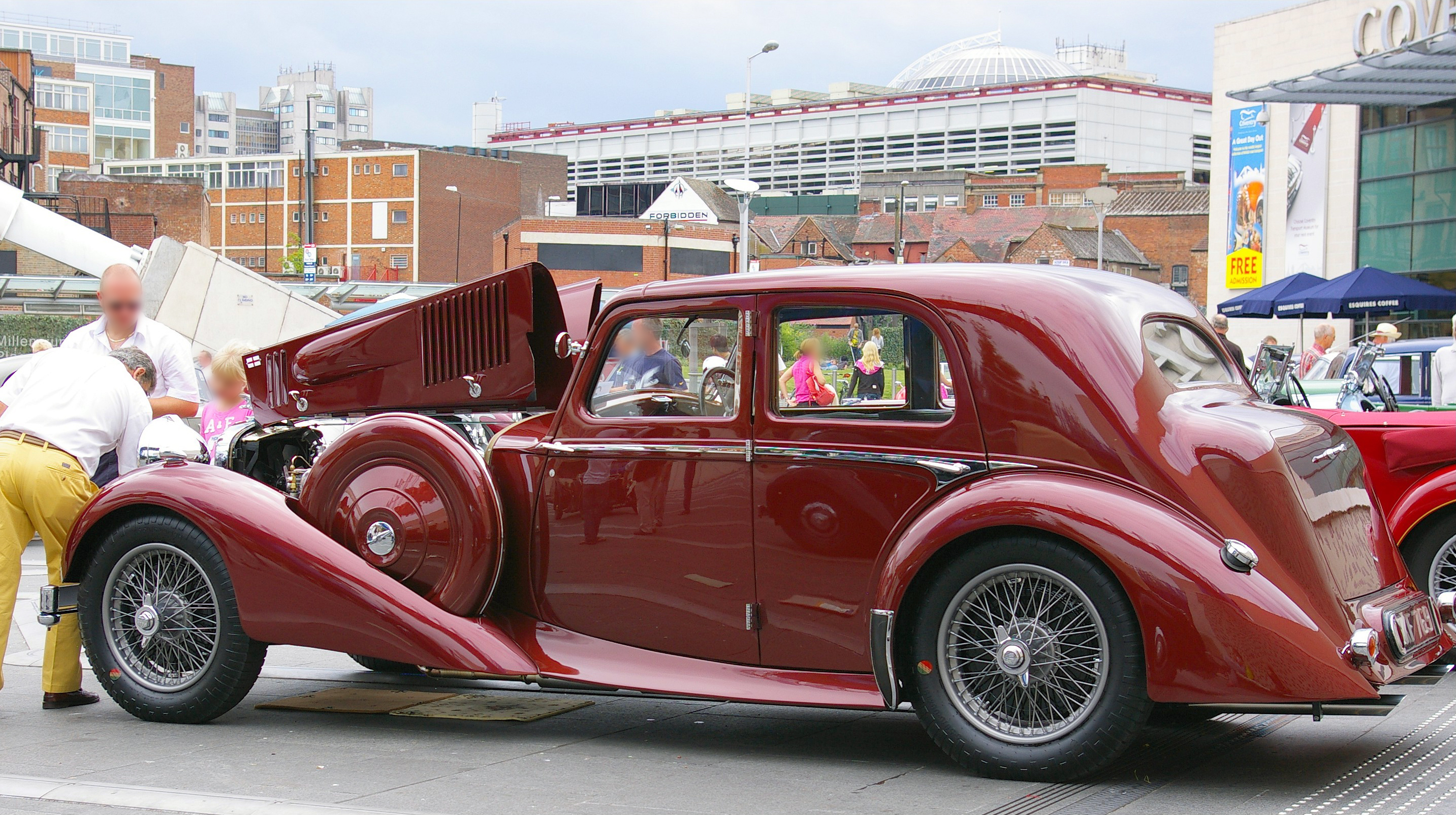
Standard short-chassis 4-door saloon by Charlesworth, 1939

There were to be only detail changes for 1940
