= Alvis Speed 20 =

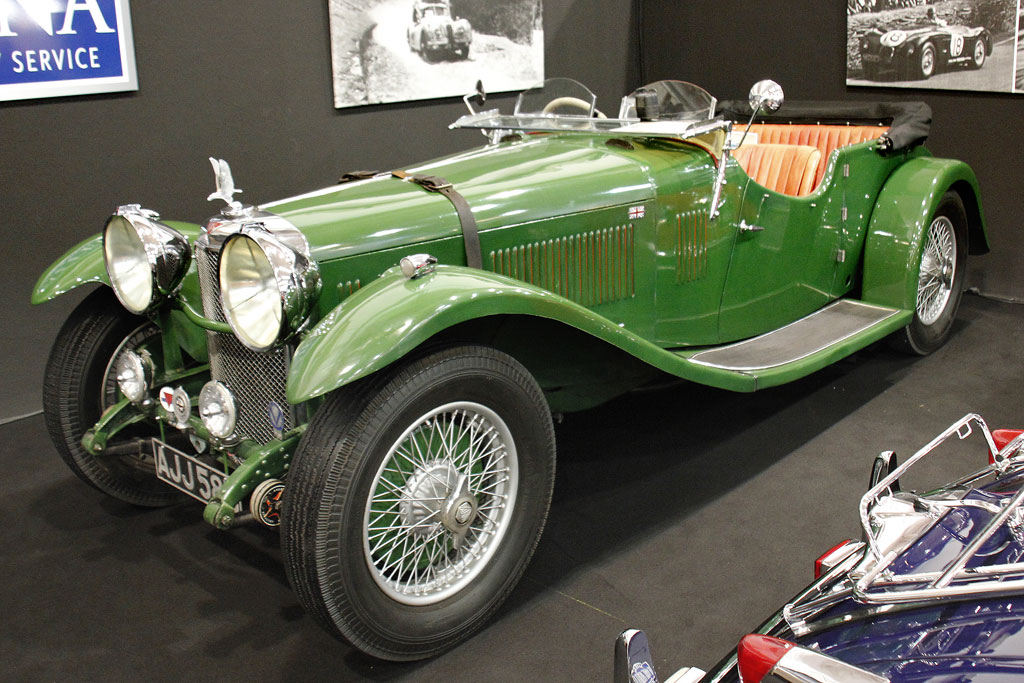
- 1933 Speed 20 SA sports 4-seater by Vanden Plas

Overview
- Manufacturer: Alvis
- Production: 1932–36; 1165 made

Body and chassis
- Class: Mid-size
- Body style: 4-door sports saloon; 4-seater drop head coupé; sports 4-seater; chassis for bespoke body
- Layout: Front-engine, rear-wheel-drive

Powertrain
- Engine: SA & SB 2,511 cc (153 cu in); SC & SD 2,762 cc (169 cu in); 3½-litre 3,571 cc (218 cu in); Straight-6
- Transmission: 4-speed manual transmission

Dimensions
- Wheelbase: SA 123 in (3,124 mm); SA option 132 in (3,353 mm); SB-SD 124 in (3,150 mm); SD option 130 in (3,302 mm); 3½-litre 127 in (3,226 mm); track 56 in (1,422 mm)
- Width: 65 in (1,651 mm) SA; 66.5 in (1,689 mm) SB-SD
- Kerb weight: 3,528 lb (1,600 kg) (4-door sports saloon)

Chronology
- Predecessor: Alvis Silver Eagle
- Successor: Alvis Speed 25

Speed Twenty and 3½-litre
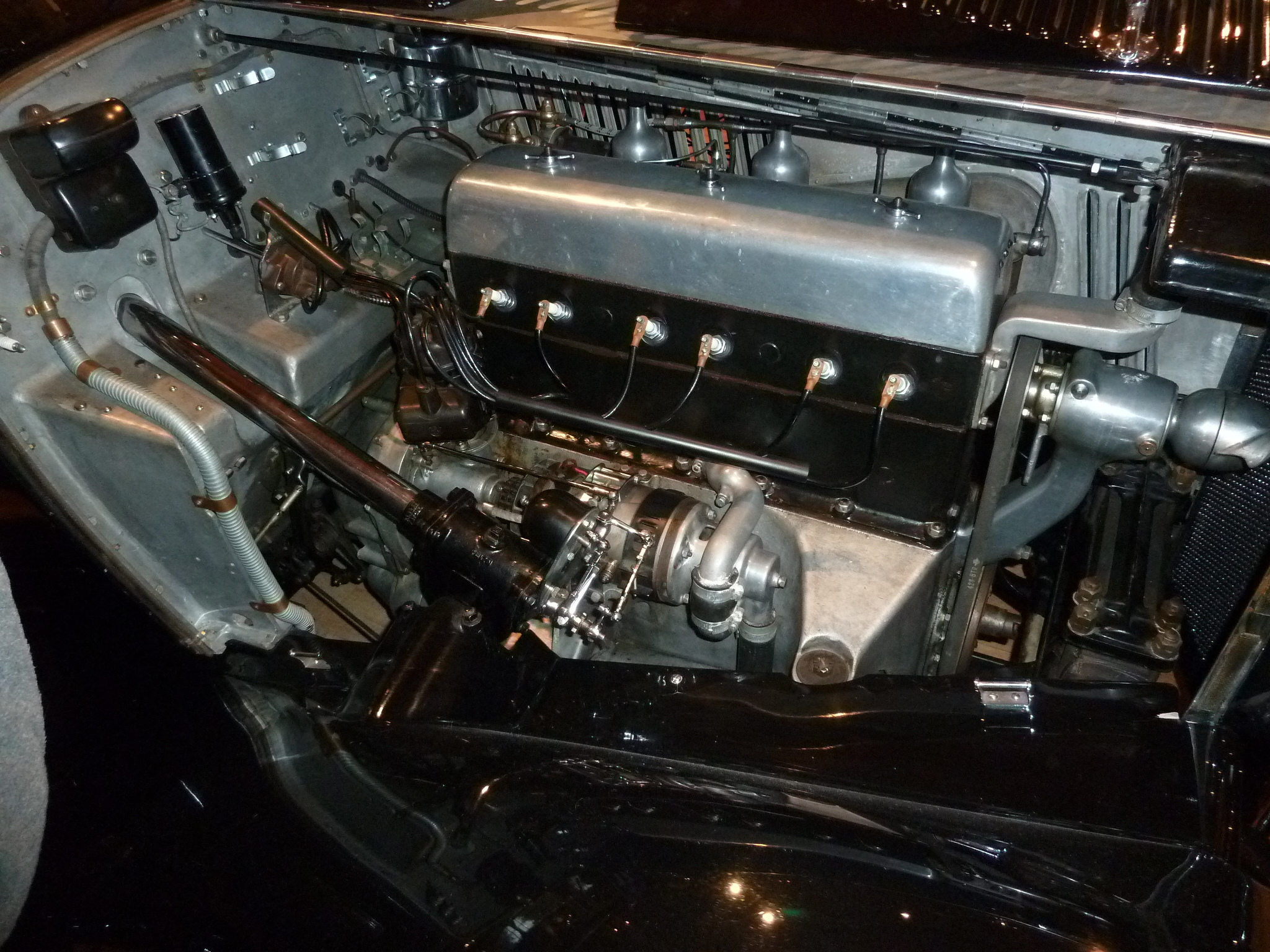
- 1935 Speed Twenty SC

Overview
- Manufacturer: Alvis

Layout
- Configuration: straight-six
- Displacement: SA & SB 2,511 cc (153 cu in); SC & SD 2,762 cc (169 cu in); 3½-litre 3,571 cc (218 cu in)
- Cylinder bore: SA to SD 73 mm (2.9 in); 3½-litre 83 mm (3.3 in)
- Piston stroke: SA & SB 100 mm (3.9 in); SC & SD 110 mm (4.3 in)
- Cylinder block material: 4-bearing balanced crankshaft with torsional vibration damper
- Cylinder head material: alloy pistons
- Valvetrain: pushrod overhead valves camshaft drive by duplex chain patented multiple valve springs

Combustion
- Fuel system: 3 SU carburettors supplied by double petrolift hotspot and dual ignition
- Fuel type: petrol
- Oil system: forced lubrication to main and big end bearings, rockers and pushrods
- Cooling system: water, thermostatic radiator shutters, centrifugal pump

Output
- Power output: SB 95 bhp @ 4,000 rpm; 3½-litre 102 bhp @ 3,600 rpm; SA to SD 19.82 tax horsepower; 3½-litre 25.63 tax horsepower

Chronology
- Predecessor: Silver Eagle

The Alvis Speed 20 is a British touring car that was made between late 1931 and 1936 by Alvis Car and Engineering Company in Coventry. It went through four variants coded SA to SD.

In October 1935 the Speed 20 was supplemented by a 3½-litre car initially sold alongside their Speed 20 SD and named 3½-litre SA. After their Speed 20 was dropped from their catalogue the 3½-litre car was given a shorter wheelbase and named Speed 25 SB.

== Speed 20 SA ==
The engine for the Speed 20 was a heavily modified version of the one used in the preceding Silver Eagle cars, producing 87 bhp (65 kW). Triple HV4 type SU carburettors were fitted. As before the engine and clutch unit sat on flexible conical rubber mountings in a system used by Alvis from 1925. The chassis was new and lowered by making it a "double drop" type where the side rails go over the front and rear axles. A centralised lubrication system was fitted allowing oil to be provided to moving suspension parts through a maze of pipework. Both front and rear suspension used half-elliptic leaf springs and the self-servo brakes, with 14 in (356 mm) drums, were mechanically operated. The four-speed manual gearbox was mounted in-unit with the engine.

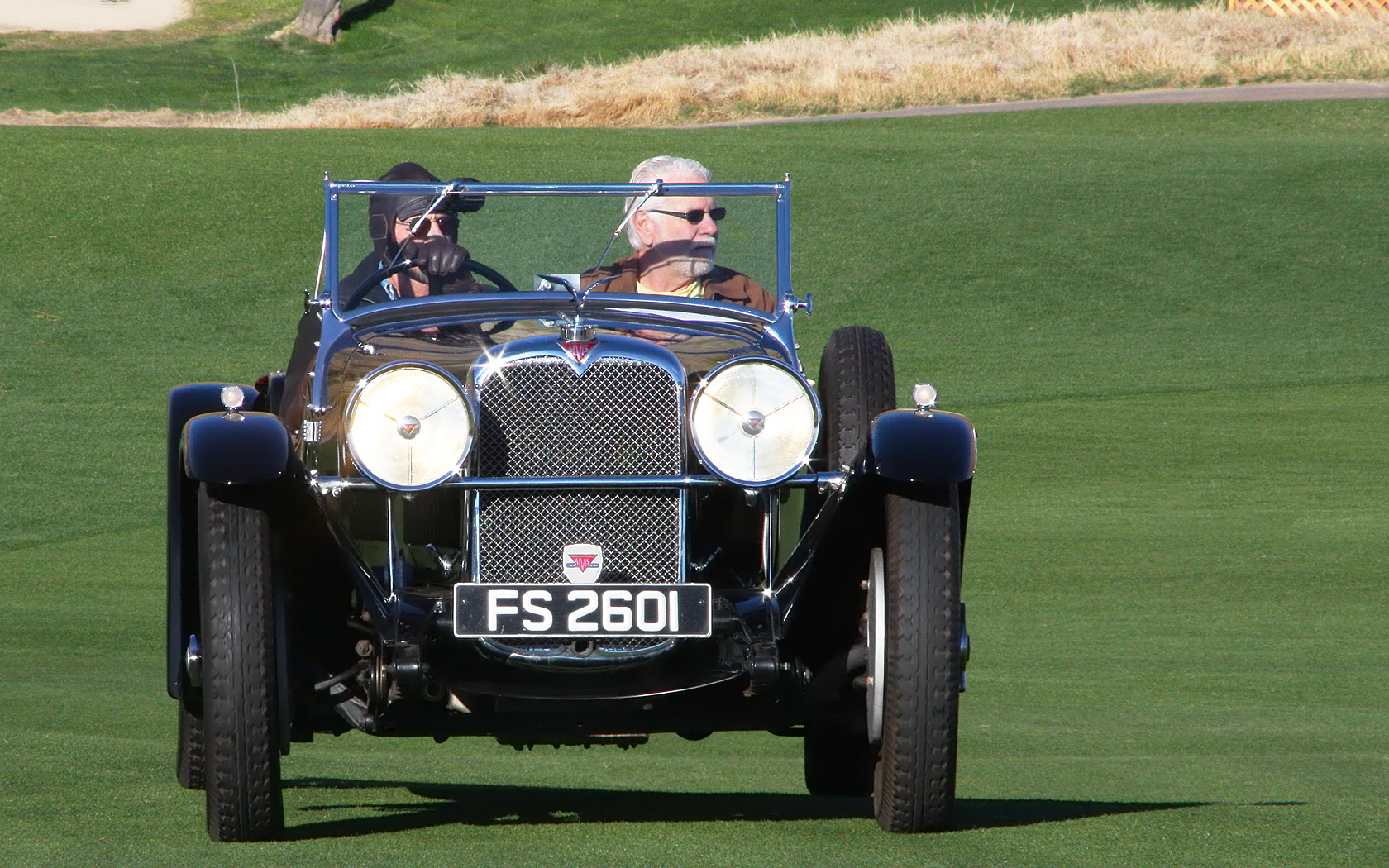
1932 Sports tourer

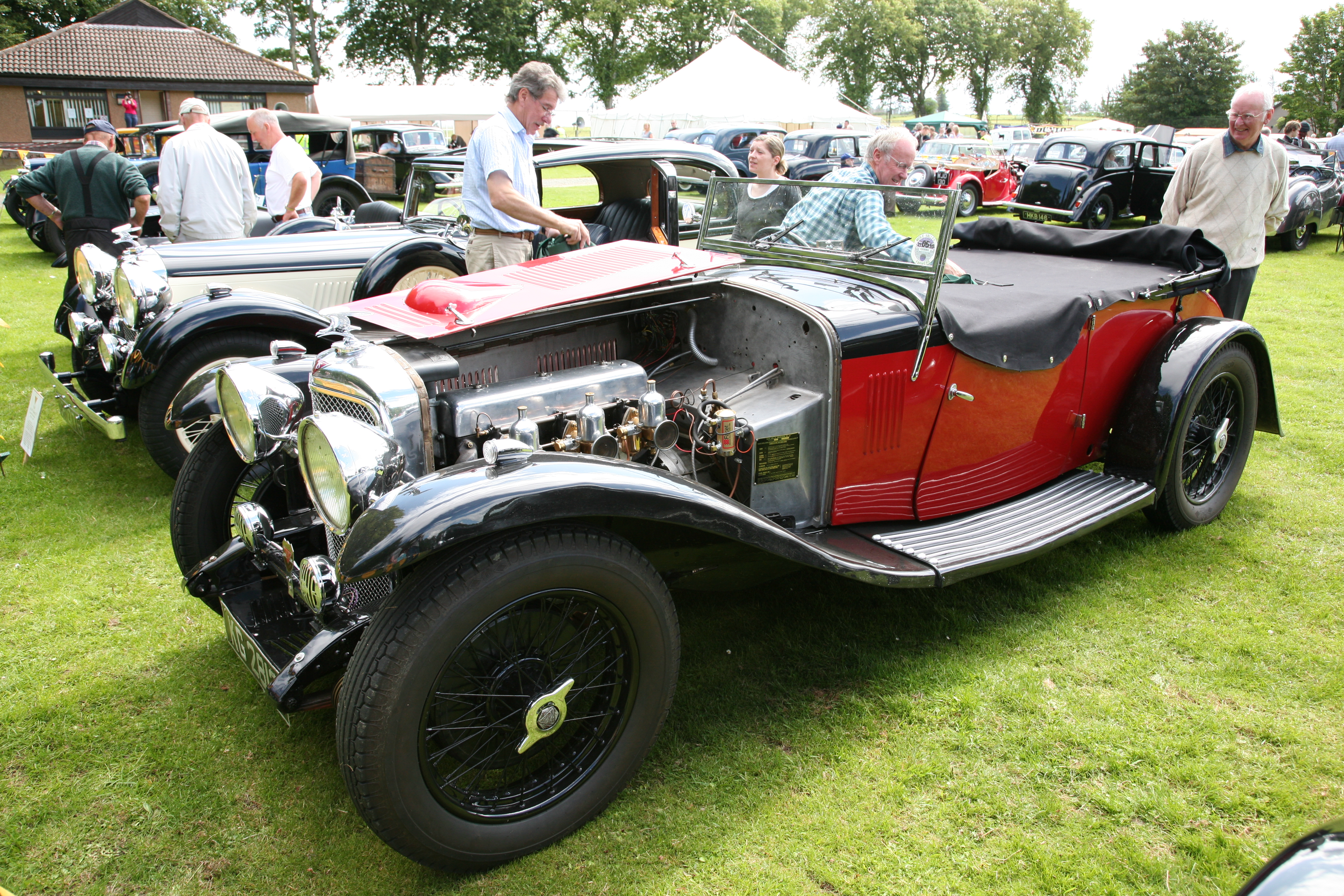
1933 Sports tourer

The car could be fitted with a variety of coachwork. Standard bodies were a four-door sports saloon from coachbuilders Charlesworth, a four-seater sports coupé or four-door tourer by Cross & Ellis, but some cars were supplied in chassis form and carried bodies by coachbuilders such as Vanden Plas. The 4-speed gearbox had constant mesh on the top two gears.. It used a single plate clutch, central change lever, open tubular propeller shaft with metal joints (arranged in a straight line), and a spiral bevel fully floating back axle.

Approximately 400 of the SA cars were made.

== Speed 20 SB ==
The SB launched at the October 1933 London Motor Show had a new cruciform braced chassis, slightly longer at 124 in (3,150 mm), with independent front suspension using a single transverse leaf spring with a long solid anchorage in the centre. Steering was improved using new designs employed for racing Alvis cars since 1925. Road shocks were not transmitted from one wheel to the other nor did they affect the steering wheel and the gyroscopic effect was eliminated. Rear springs damped by Hartford Telecontrol dampers are long and underslung. The engine remained the same but the new all-silent gearbox, the first of its type, had synchromesh on all gears and was mounted separately from the engine. A built-in jacking system was fitted as standard.

As with the SA, a wide range of bodies were fitted to the cars. Large Lucas 12 in (305 mm) P100 headlamps became standard, adding to the sporting appearance of the car.

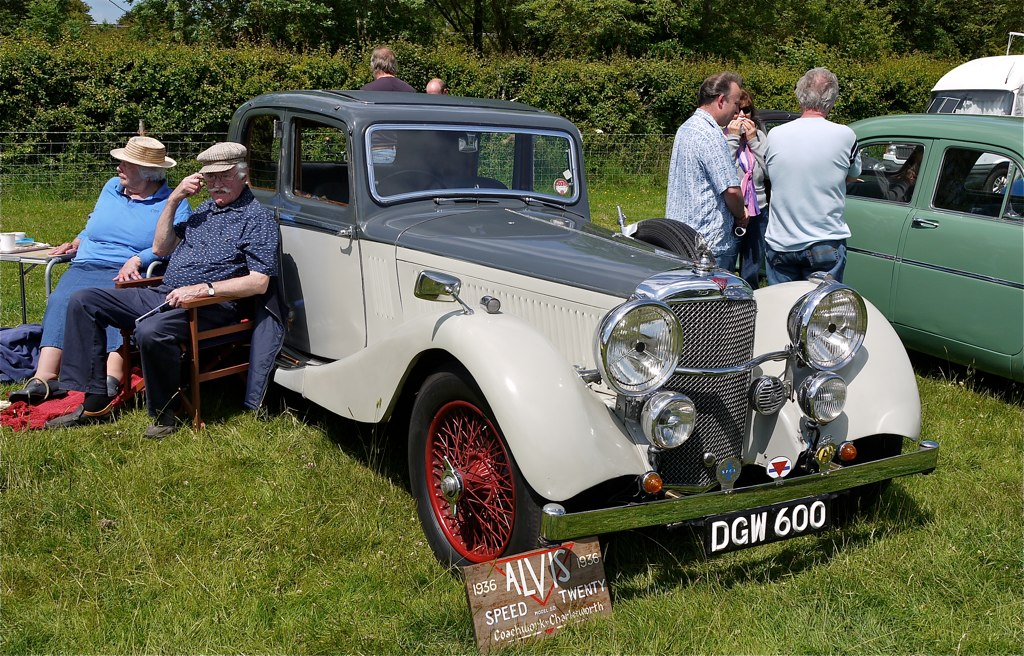
Speed 20 standard 4-door sports saloon by Charlesworth

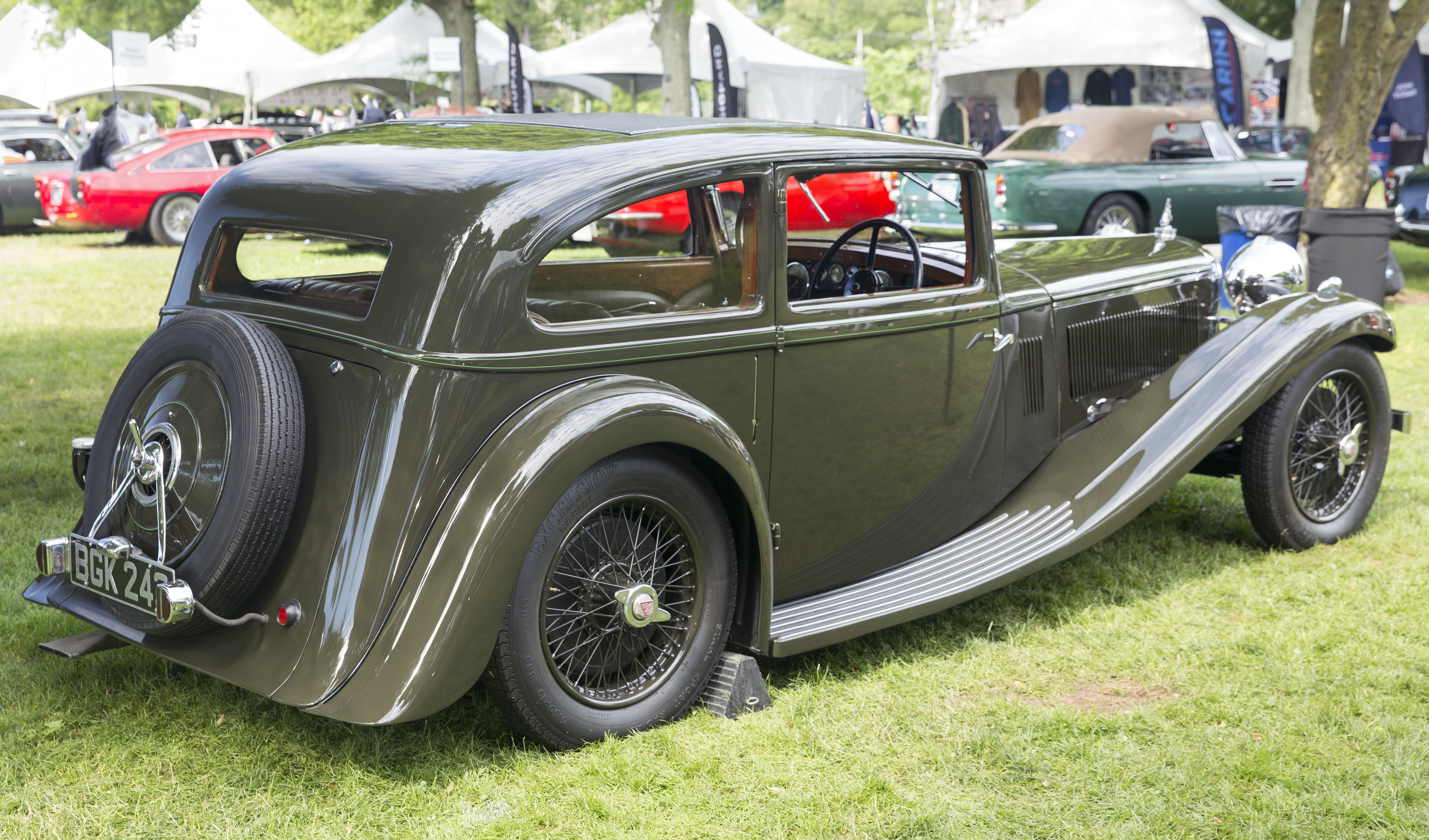
1934 Speed 20 SB "flat-back" two-door saloon by Vanden Plas

=== Road test ===
The Times motoring correspondent tested and after describing its technical features in detail reviewed the car. Salient comments have been summarised as follows. The four-seater saloon was described as "distinctly fast in acceleration and speed" with a comfortable body such that a passer-by looks twice at it. A third person could be squeezed into the back seat. The four windows in the four doors allowed a good view all round. It was noted that each front wheel was independently steered and sprung in the manner introduced on the Alvis Crested Eagle and used on Alvis's racing cars since 1925, the aim being to provide good directional stability, road-holding and comfort.

The steering and suspension was a star feature, the steering action exceptionally steady and light. The car does not heel or roll and there is little wheel bounce. The best speeds on second and third gears were 48 and 68 mph, 90 mph should be possible in top. Providing on the road such rapid acceleration and high rates the engine ran fairly quietly and with smoothness yet displaying exuberant spirits. The action of clutch and new gear change was pleasing.

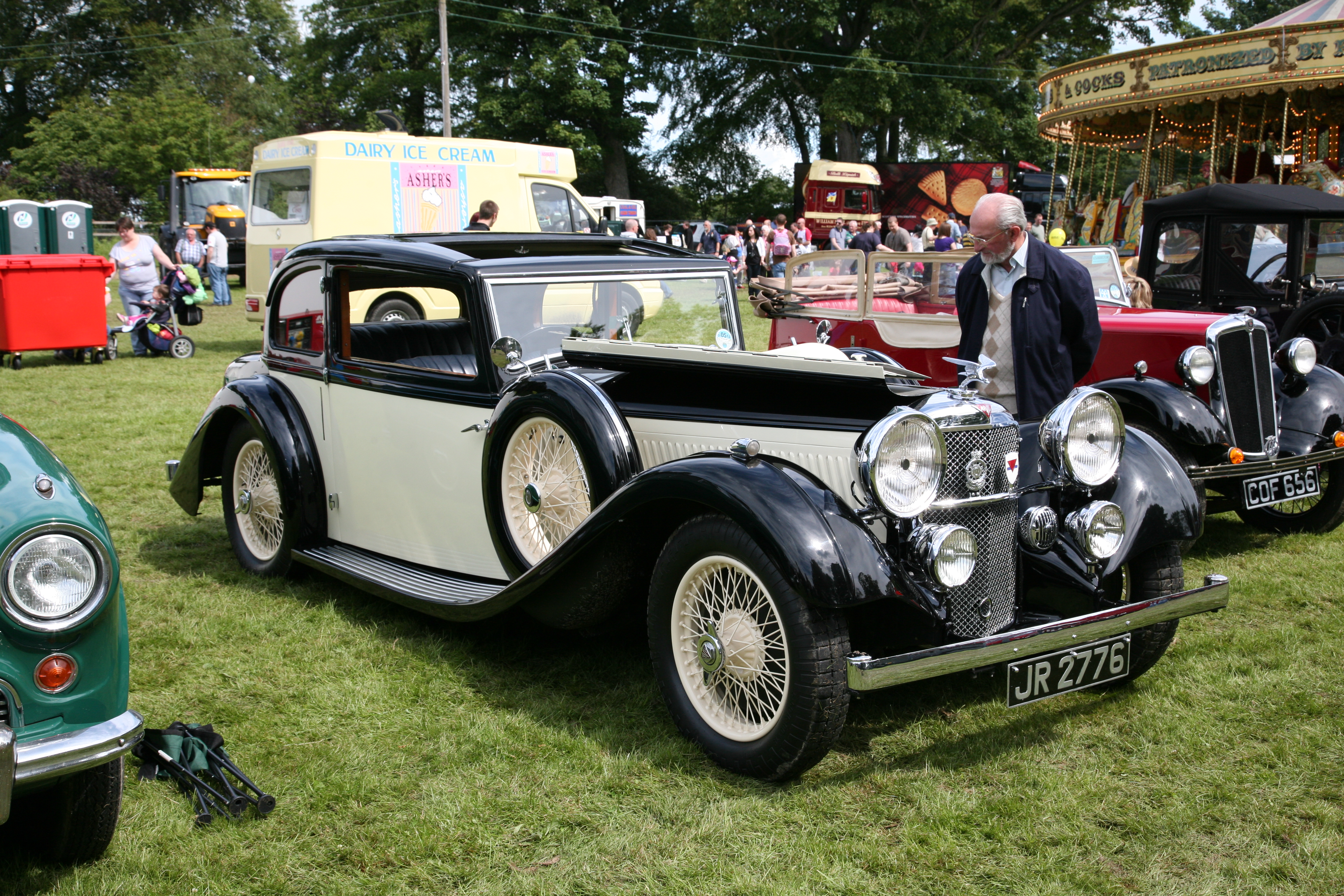
1934 Speed 20 SC fixed head coupé by Vanden Plas

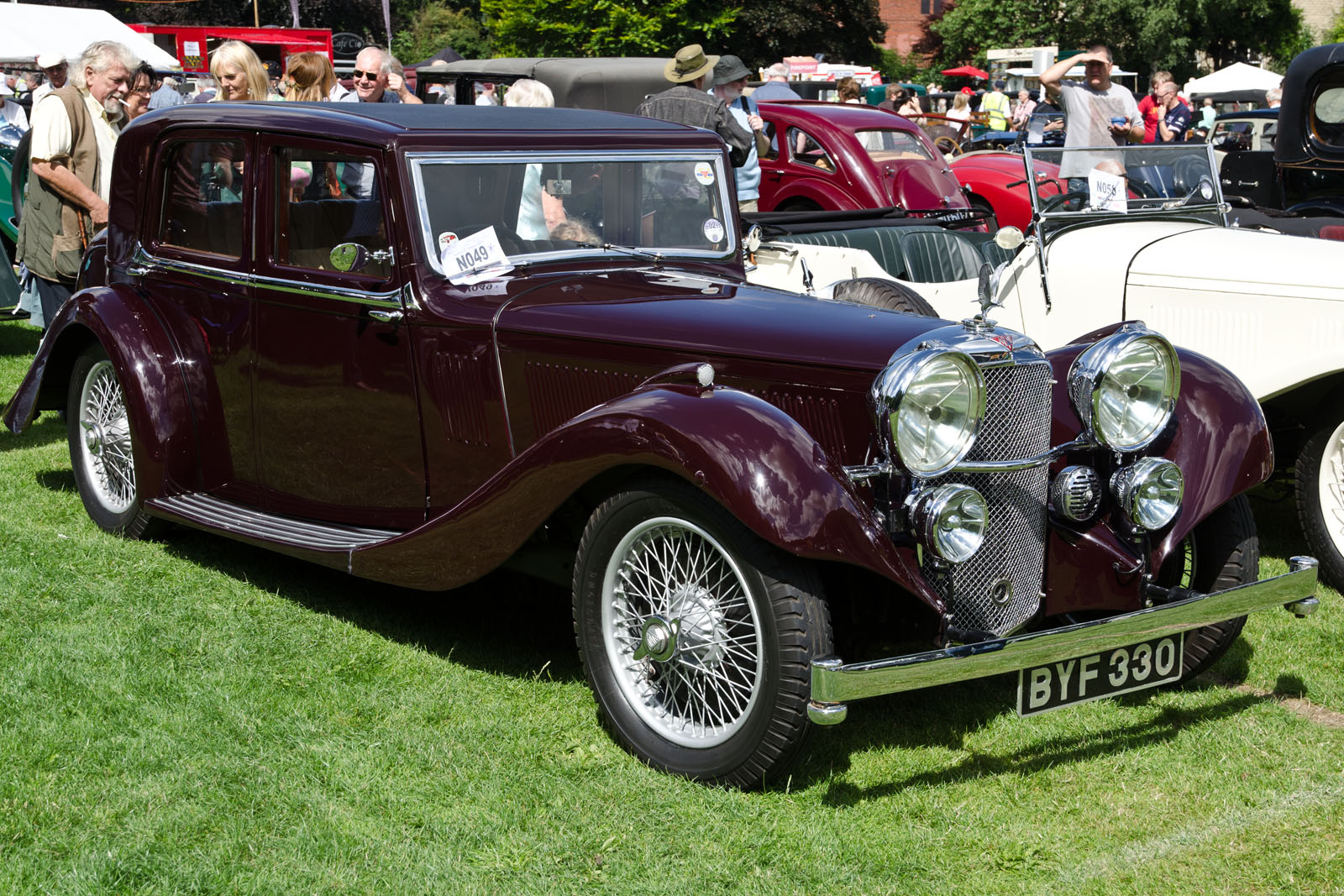
1935 Speed 20 SC sports saloon by Mayfair

== Speed 20 SC ==
For 1935 the engine grew to 2762 cc by increasing the stroke to 110 mm (4.33 in) and the range designation became SC. Modifications were also made to the complex steering gear, and the front damping was improved. Twin electric fuel pumps were provided. At the rear the chassis was stiffened by having side members above and below the axle.

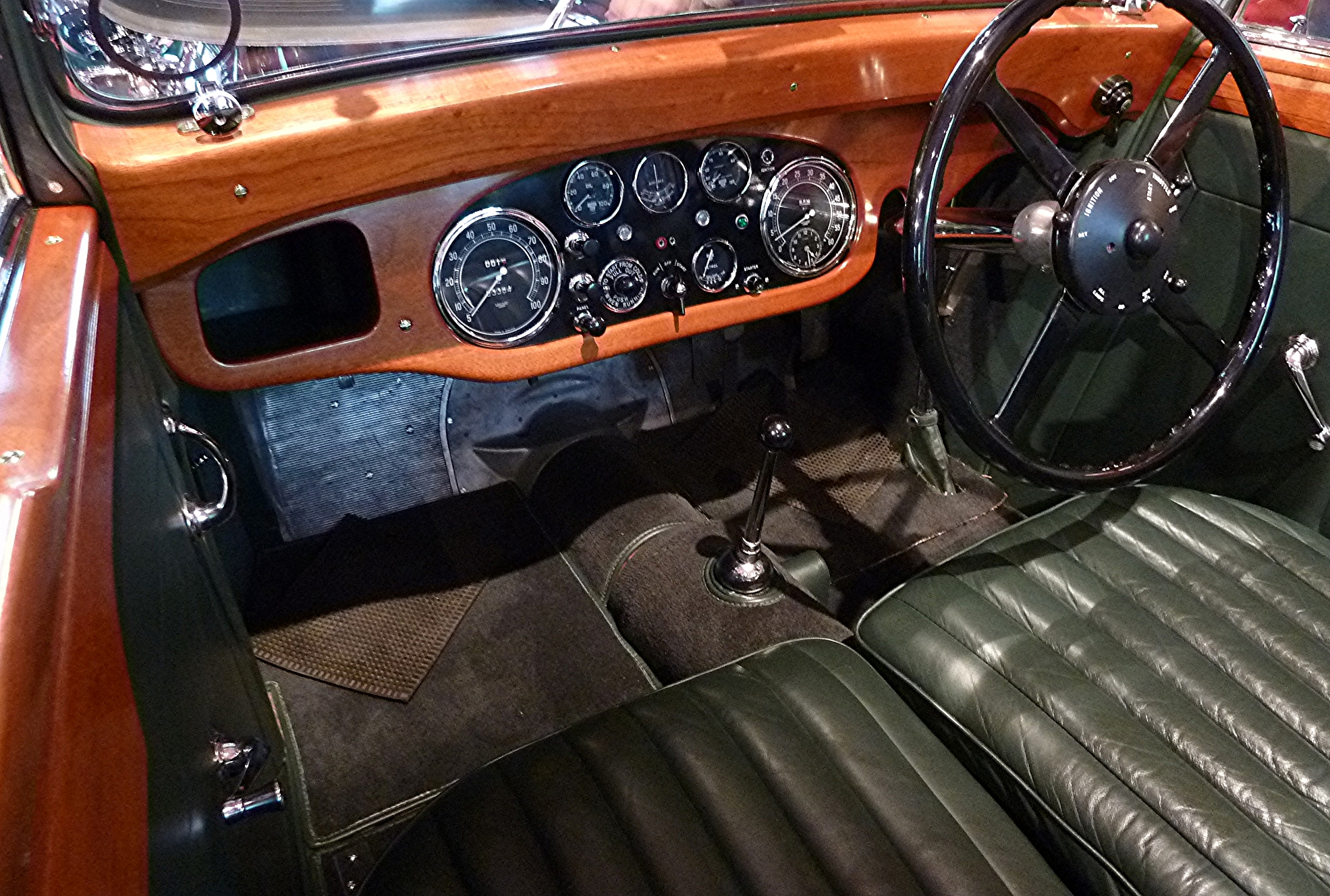
Speed 20 SC instrument panel

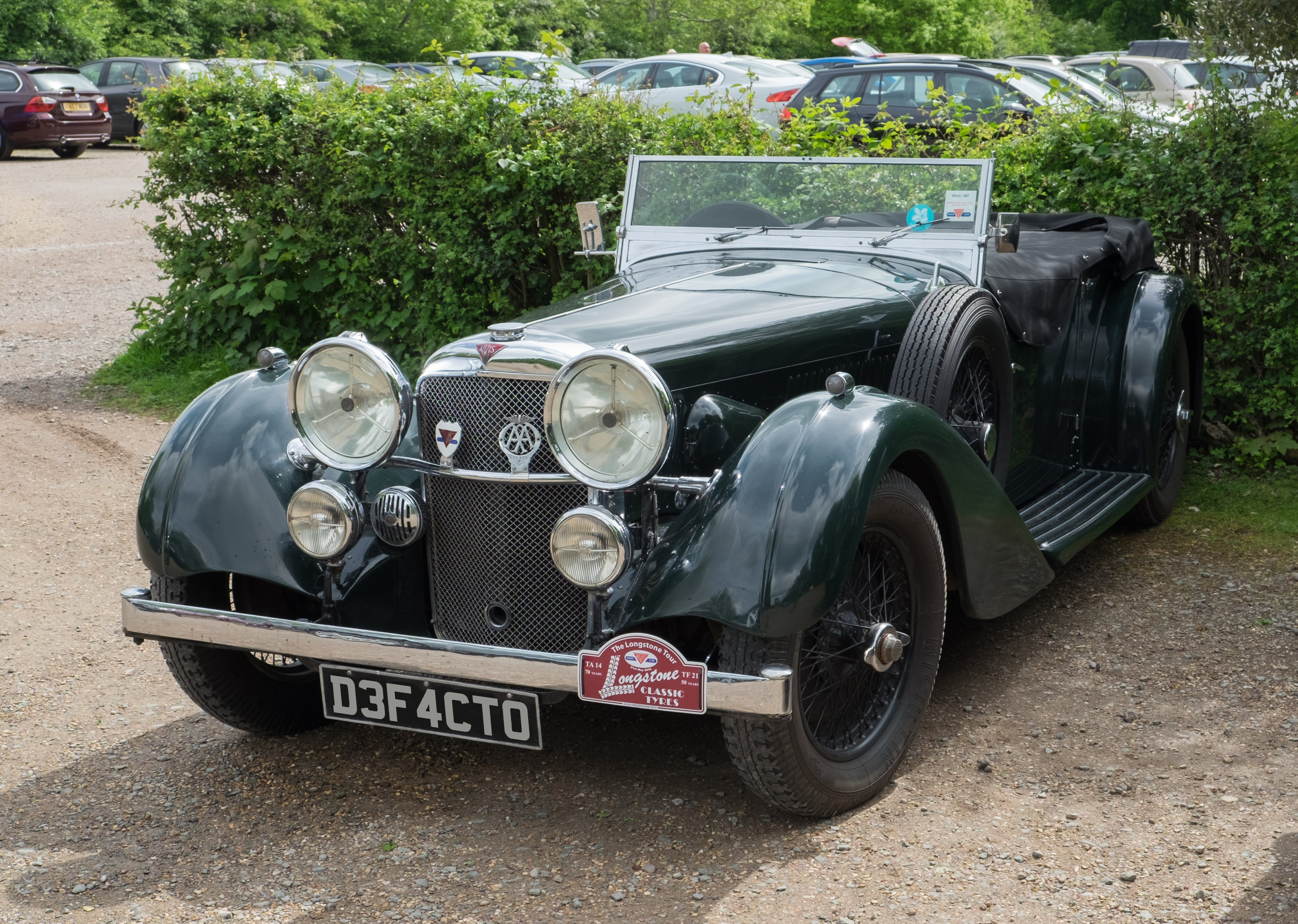
Speed 20 SC

== Speed 20 SD ==
The final SD version for 1936 was similar to the SC but had a larger fuel tank and slightly wider bodywork. A 130 in (3,302 mm) wheelbase version became an option.

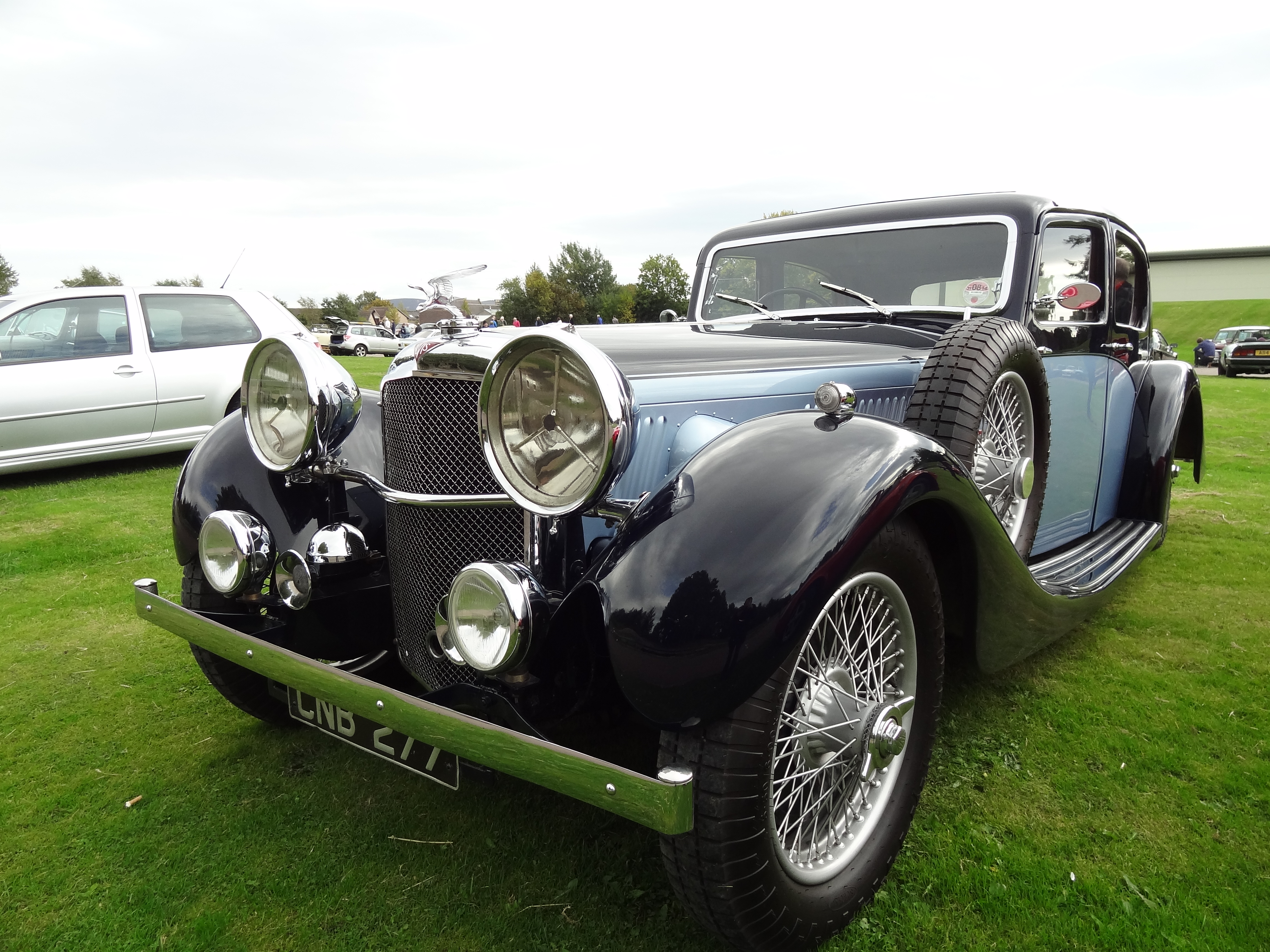
1936 Speed 20 SD 4-dr sports saloon by Lancefield

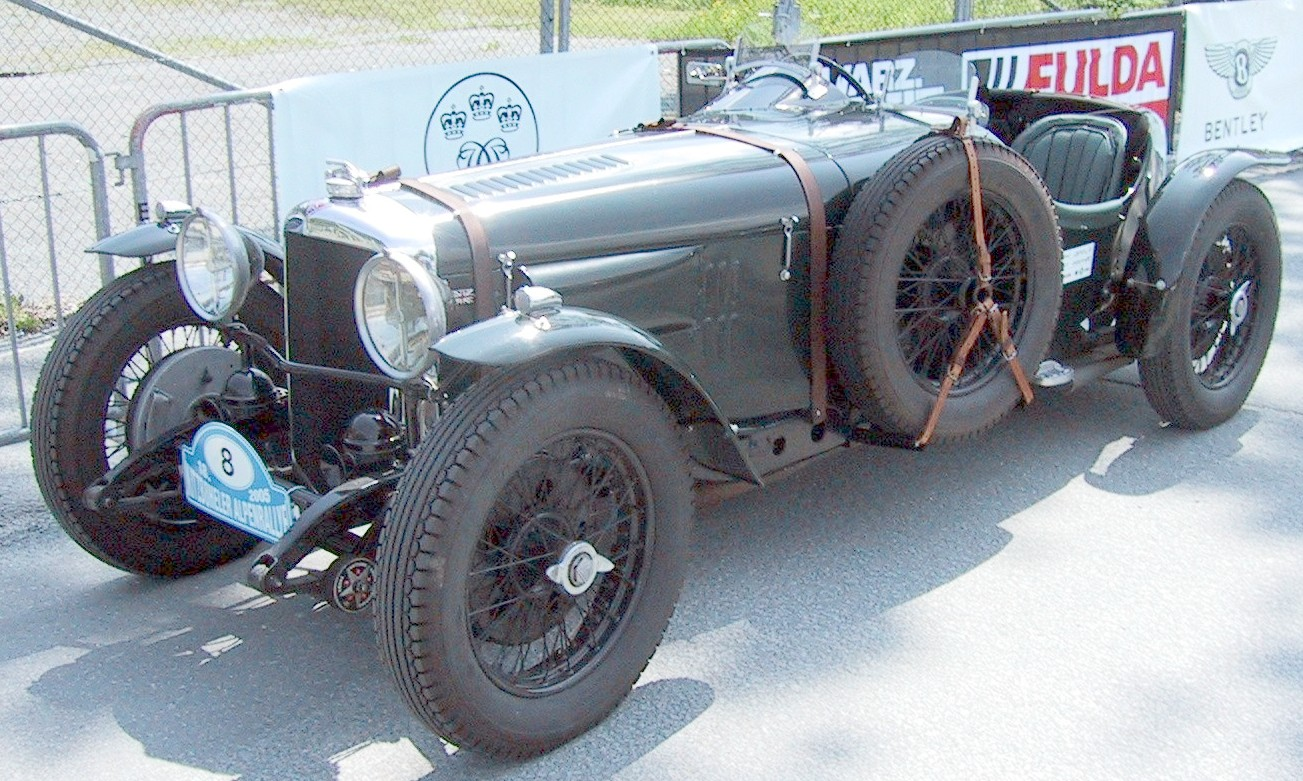
1936 Speed 20 with open two-seater body

== 3½-litre engine ==
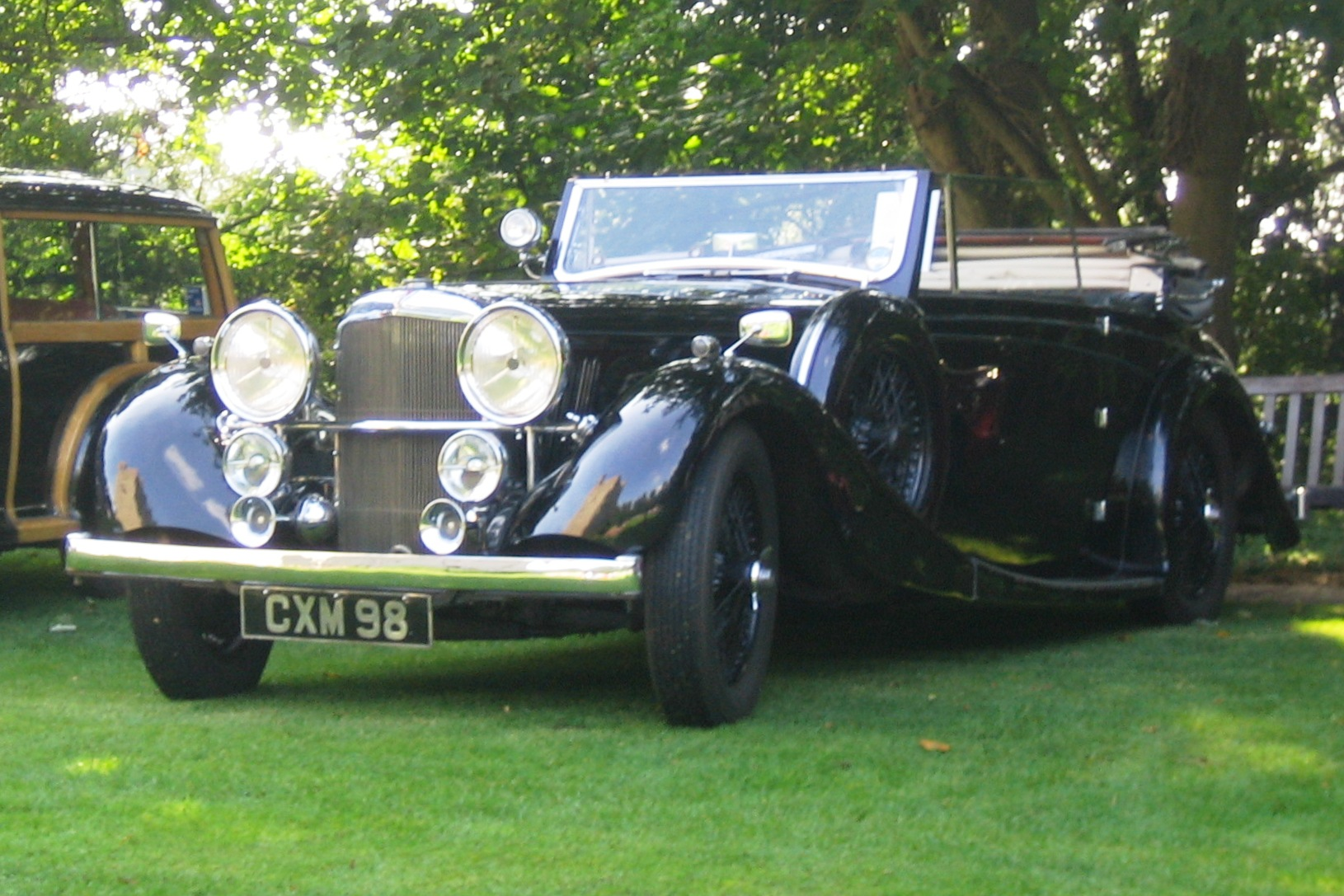
1936 3½-litre drophead coupé by Charlesworth

As with many cars of the time, bodies were getting more luxurious and hence heavier. Five weeks after their 30 August 1935 announcement of minor improvements to their Speed 20 Alvis announced a new additional 3½-litre 102hp engine fed by triple SU carburettors naming it 3½-litre SA. Twelve months later, given a strengthened engine with seven main bearings, it was renamed Speed 25.
