= Vanden Plas =

Coachbuilder

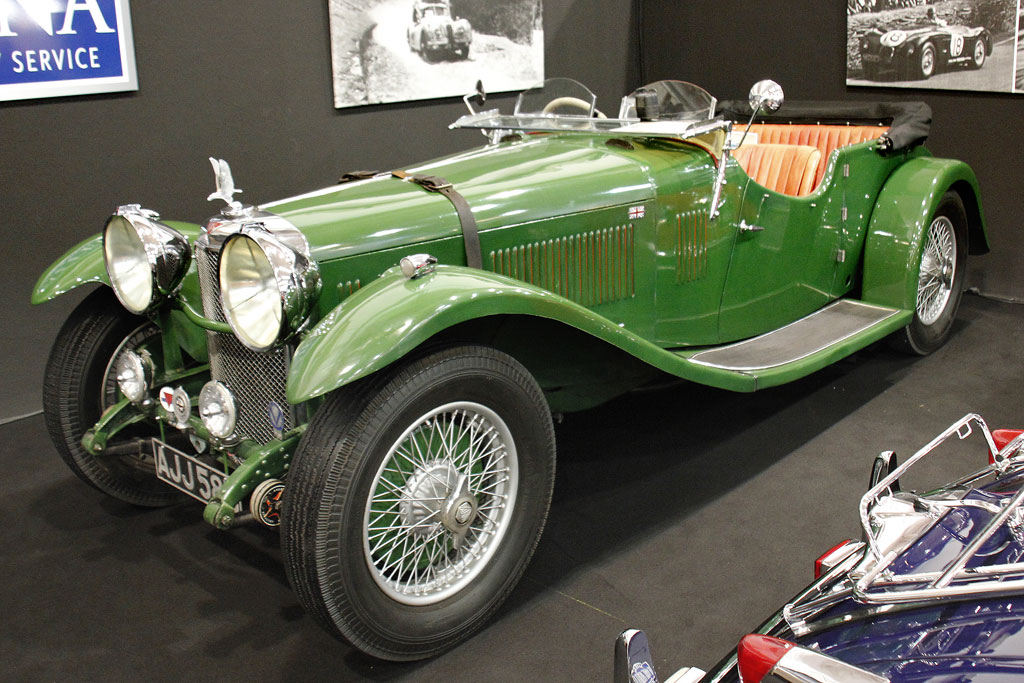
Alvis Speed 20 coachwork by Vanden Plas 1933

Vanden Plas is the name of coachbuilders who produced bodies for specialist and up-market automobile manufacturers. Latterly, the name became a top-end luxury model designation for cars from subsidiaries of British Leyland and the Rover Group, being last used in 2009 to denote the top-luxury version of the Jaguar XJ (X350).

== Belgium and England ==
=== Batched and bespoke coachwork ===
The business began in 1870 in Brussels, Belgium, initially making axles, and later producing horse-drawn carriages. It was founded by Guillaume van den Plas, a blacksmith, and his three sons, Antoine, Henri, and Willy, who later set up a branch in Paris. In 1884, they moved from Brussels to Antwerp. With increased business, they opened a branch in Brussels again in 1890. By 1900, they worked with De Dion Bouton, Berlier, Germain, and Packard. By 1908, Carrosserie Van den Plas had a workforce of 400 men producing 300 special bodies a year, and that soon increased to over 750. The French branch ceased production in 1934, while the Belgian business was active until 1949.

The coachbuilder's name first appeared in the United Kingdom in 1906, when Métallurgique cars were imported with Carrosserie Van den Plas coachwork. The first Vanden Plas company in England was established by Warwick Wright (now Peugeot dealers) in 1913, building bodies under license from Carrosserie Van den Plas, Belgium.

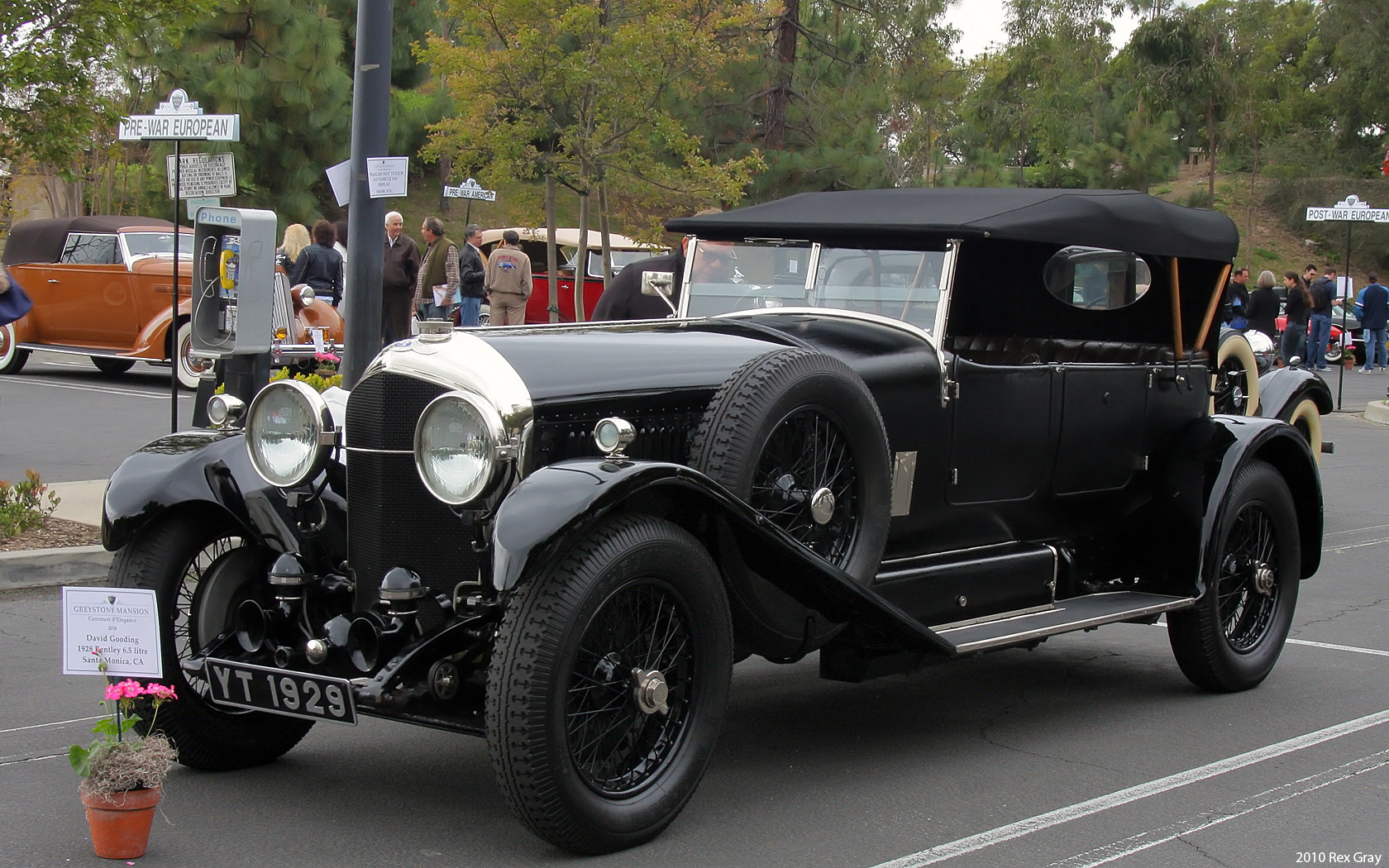
Bentley 6½ Litre, open touring coachwork by Vanden Plas 1928

During the First World War, UK activities were switched to aircraft production, and the UK business was acquired by The Aircraft Manufacturing Company, based at Hendon near London. In 1917, Vanden Plas (1917) Ltd. was incorporated. After the war, it seems to have been a struggle to return to coachbuilding, and in 1922, the company was placed in receivership. The exclusive UK naming rights seem to have been lost because in the early 1920s, the Belgian firm was exhibiting at the London Motor Show alongside the British business. In 1923, the rights to the name and the goodwill were purchased by the Fox brothers, who incorporated Vanden Plas (England) 1923 Limited. They moved the business from Hendon to Kingsbury and built on the contacts that had been made with Bentley. Between 1924 and 1931, when Bentley failed, Vanden Plas built the bodies for more than 700 of their chassis.

In the 1930s, the company became less dependent on one car maker, and supplied coachwork to such as Alvis, Armstrong Siddeley, Bentley, Daimler, Lagonda, Rolls-Royce, and Talbot. The company also updated its production methods and took to making small batches of similar bodies. With the outbreak of war in 1939, coachbuilding stopped, and the company returned to aircraft work, manufacturing the wooden framework for the de Havilland Mosquito, one of the most successful aircraft of the Second World War. After the war, the company continued its association with de Havilland, and manufactured parts for the Vampire jet fighter.

=== Production limousines ===
==== Princess ====
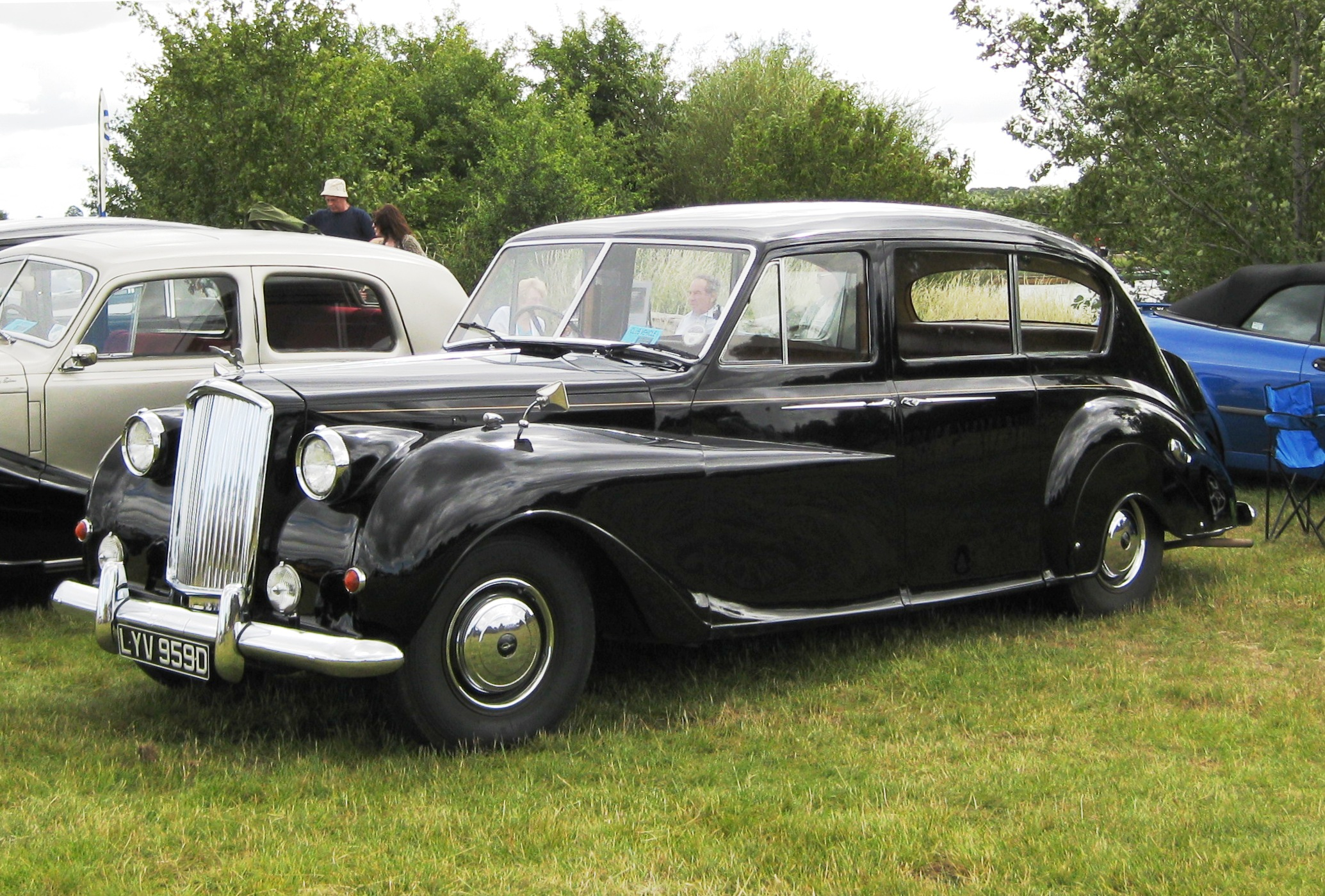
Vanden Plas Princess limousine 1966

With peace in 1945, the company looked to restart its old business when a new customer came along. Austin wanted to market a chauffeur-driven version of its in-house-built large 4-litre Rolls-Royce-size A110 Sheerline luxury car and approached Vanden Plas. Vanden Plas became a subsidiary of the Austin Motor Company in 1946 and produced Austin's A120 Princess model on the Austin Sheerline chassis.

From 1958, this began to involve chassis assembly and Austin, now BMC, recognised Vanden Plas as a motor manufacturer in its own right by dropping Austin from the name and so enabled Nuffield dealers to sell the Princess. In 1960, the Princess became the Vanden Plas Princess.

==== Daimler DS 420 ====
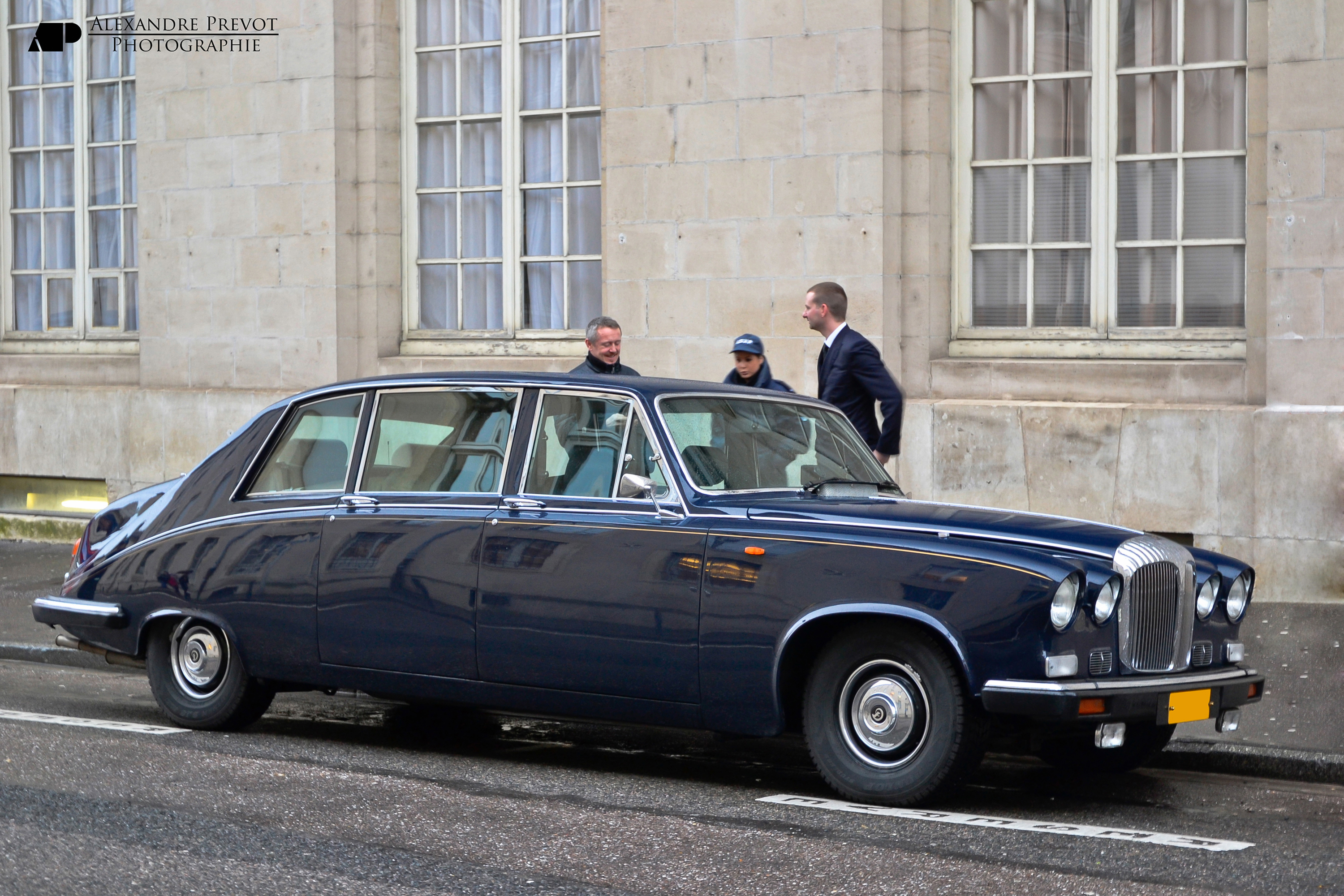
Daimler DS420 by Vanden Plas

Austin was joined in BMC by Jaguar with its new subsidiary Daimler. Production of Princess limousines ended in 1968 when they were replaced with Daimler DS420 limousines (Jaguar had acquired Daimler in 1960) built by Vanden Plas on a lengthened Jaguar Mark X platform. The DS420 was produced at the Kingsbury Lane Vanden Plas factory until it closed in November 1979.

The British Leyland board decided in 1967 there were insufficient funds for marketing the Daimler brand in North America, as well as Jaguar. From that point, Vanden Plas was used in North America instead of Daimler on Jaguar's top luxury models. Ownership of the Vanden Plas name stayed with the Rover Group, so when Jaguar was sold off, it was obliged to stop using Vanden Plas in the United Kingdom, although it continued to do so in America. Within the UK, a Daimler Double-Six Vanden Plas became a plain Daimler Double-Six.

== Badge engineering ==
Also in 1957/8, Vanden Plas were asked by Leonard Lord to add luxury fittings to a batch of Austin A105 Westminster cars, beginning the practice of using the company's skills and name for badge-engineered (and modified) luxury versions of many of the BMC (and later British Leyland (BL)) cars such as the 1100/1300 range and the Allegro (known as the Vanden Plas 1500, 1.5 & 1.7 from 1975 to 1980). The Vanden Plas works in Kingsbury, North London closed in 1979 and the marque switched to Abingdon.

From 1982 to 1989, Austin Rover made upmarket Vanden Plas models within its Metro, Maestro, Montego, and Rover SD1 and SD3 ranges.

The name is also used in North America on Jaguar cars otherwise branded Daimler in other markets between 1982–2009.

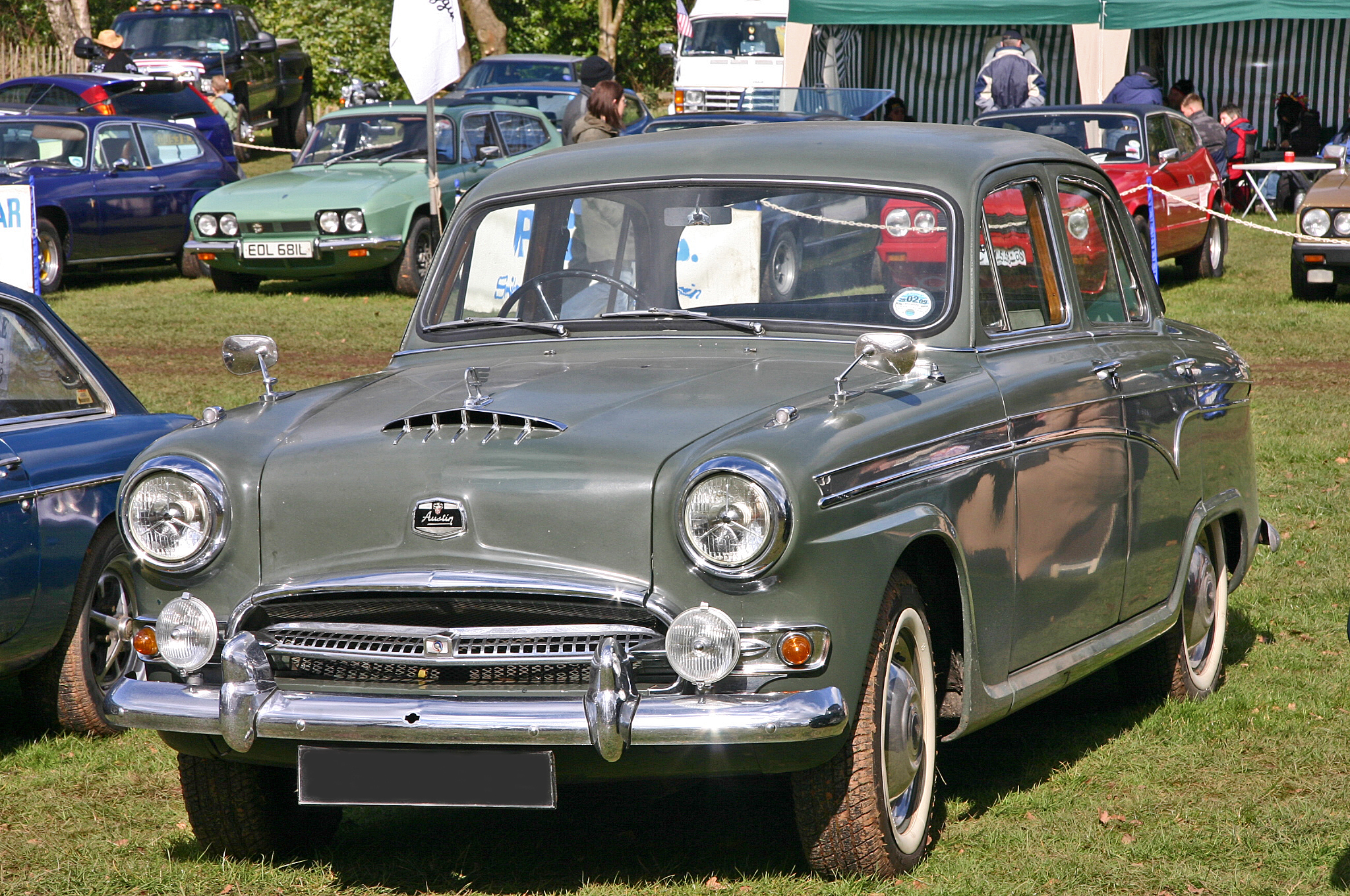
Austin A105 by Vanden Plas 1959

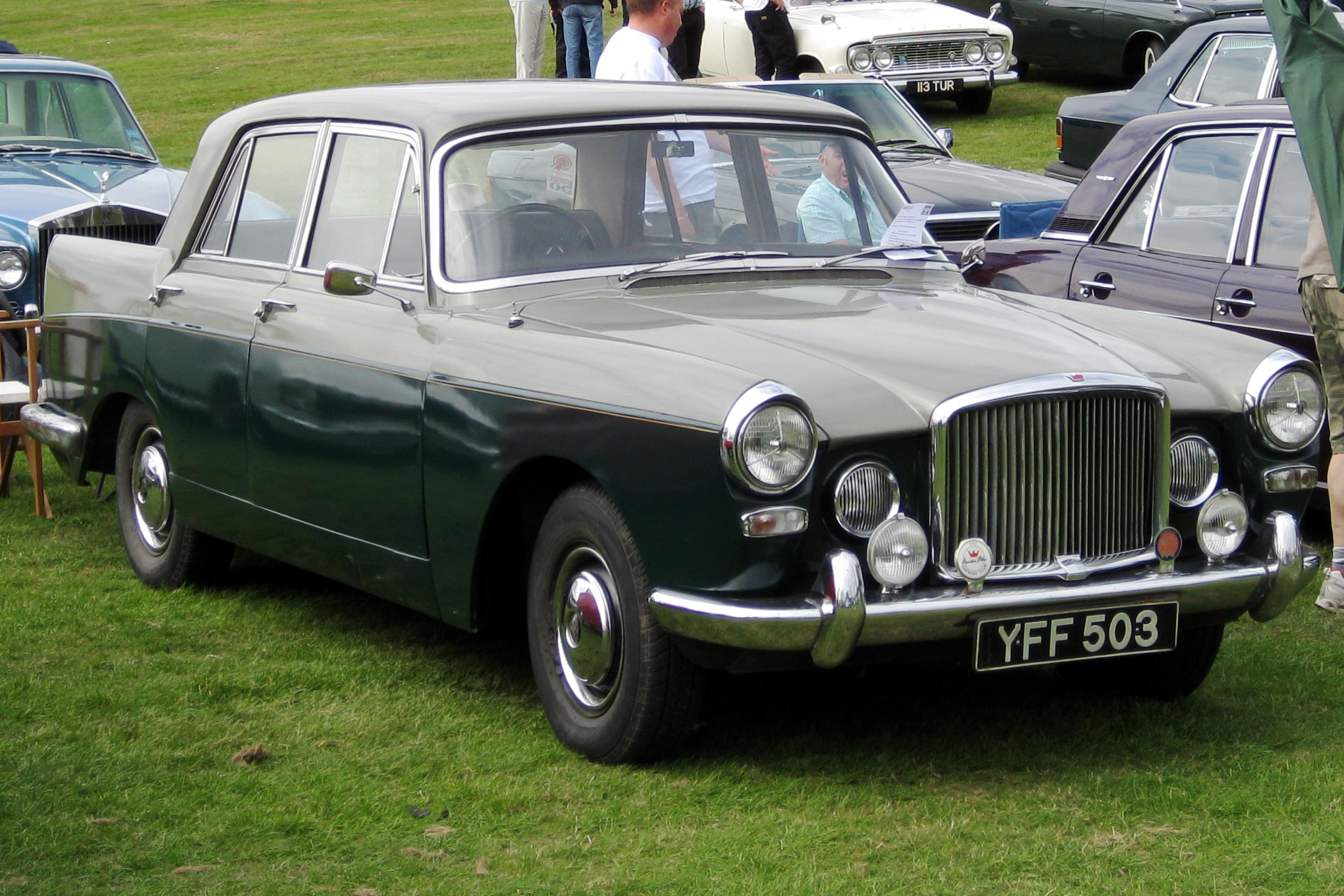
Vanden Plas Princess 3-litre 1961

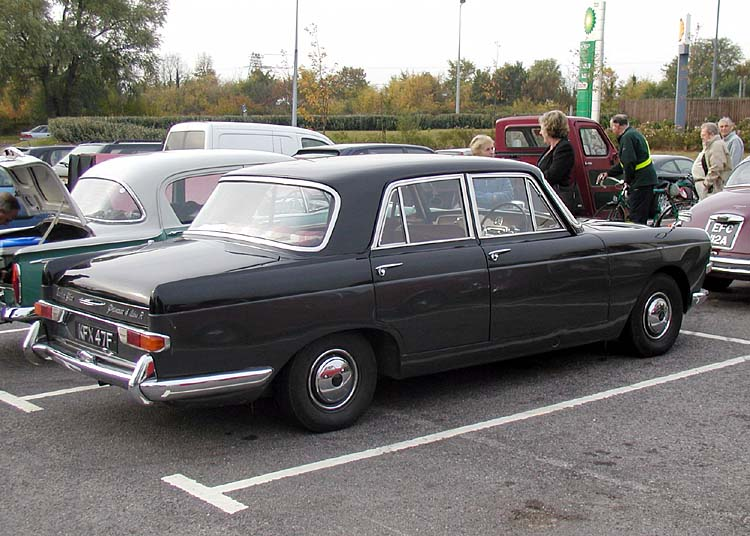
Vanden Plas Princess 4-Litre R 1967

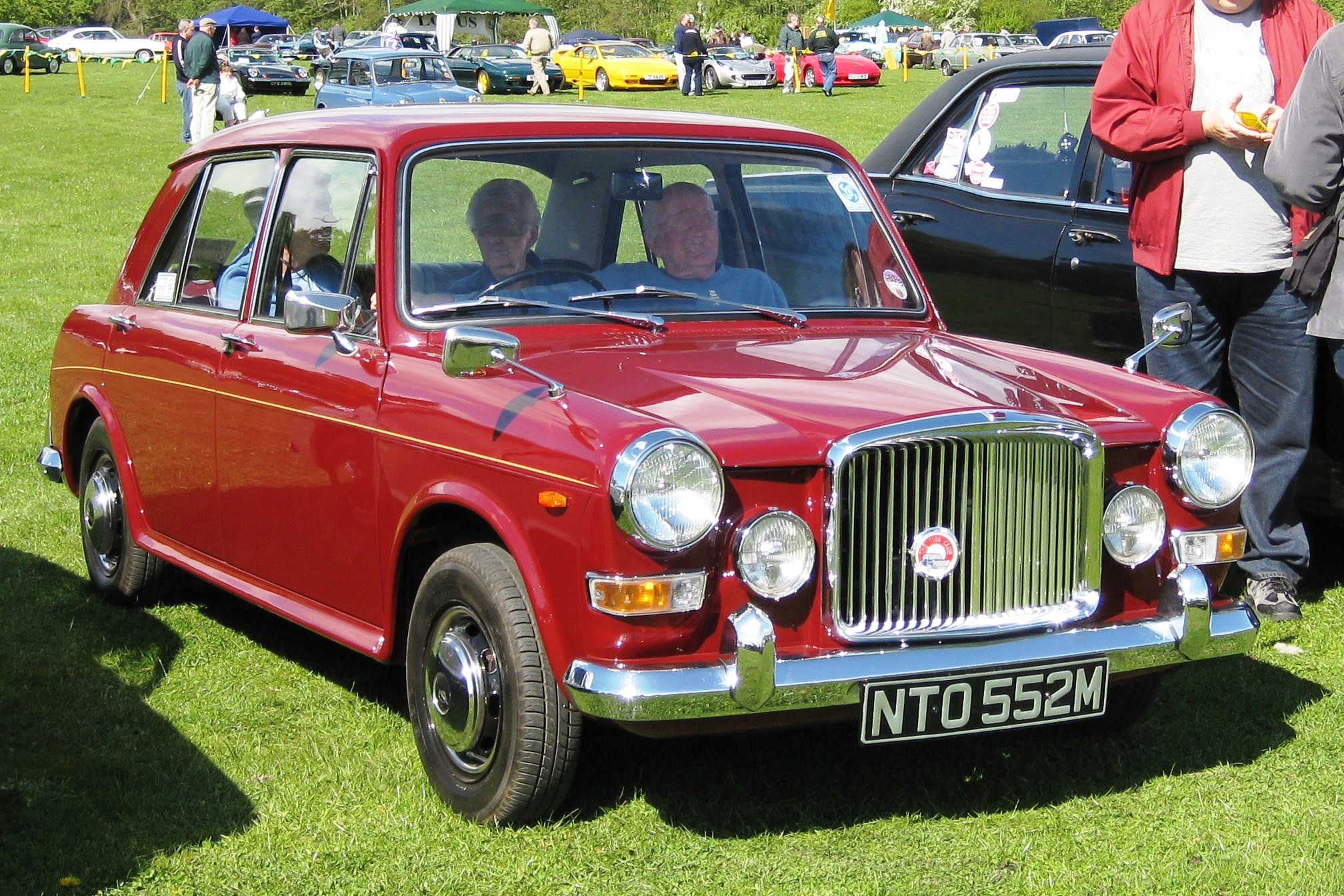
Vanden Plas Princess 1300 1973

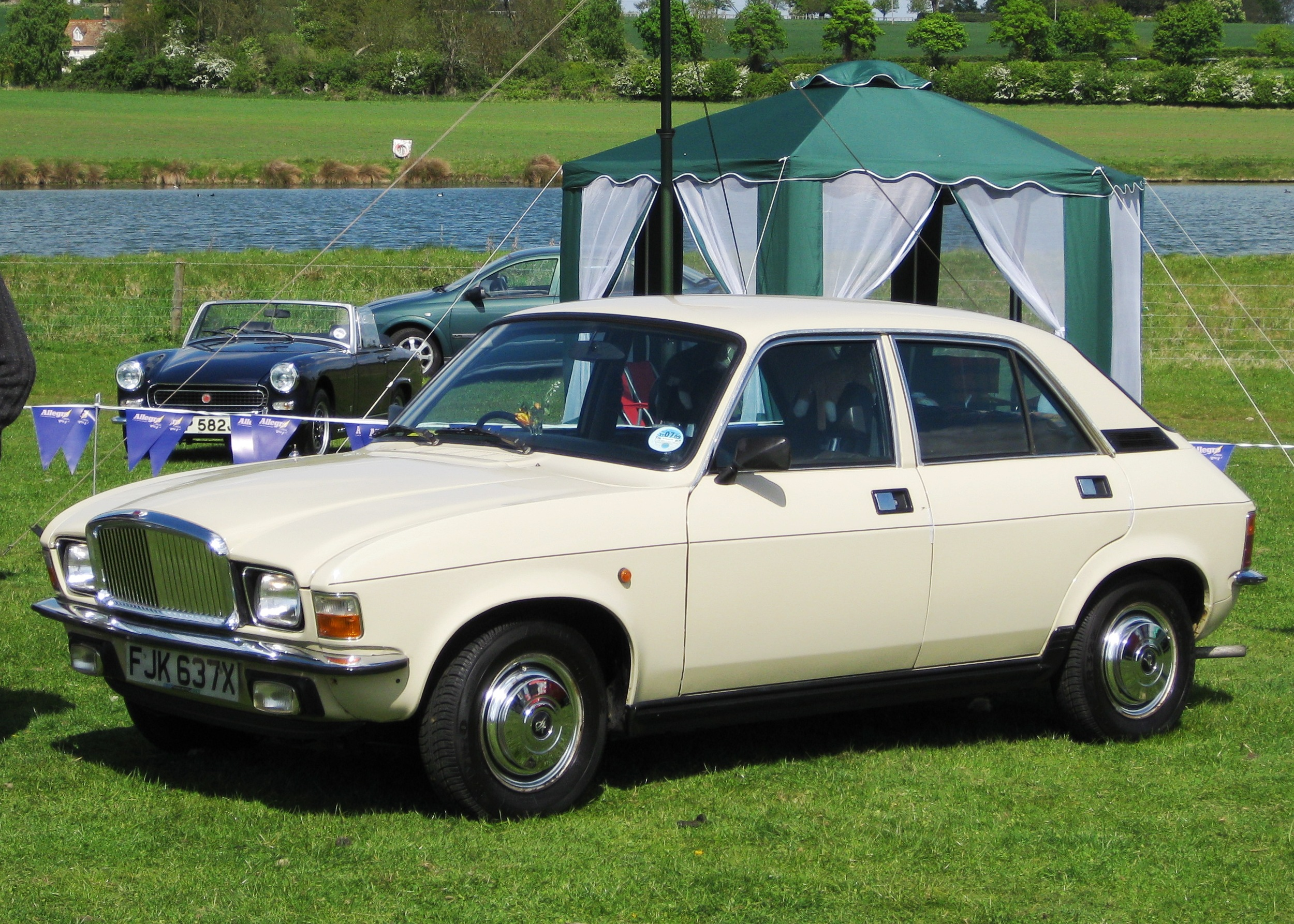
Vanden Plas 1.5 1980

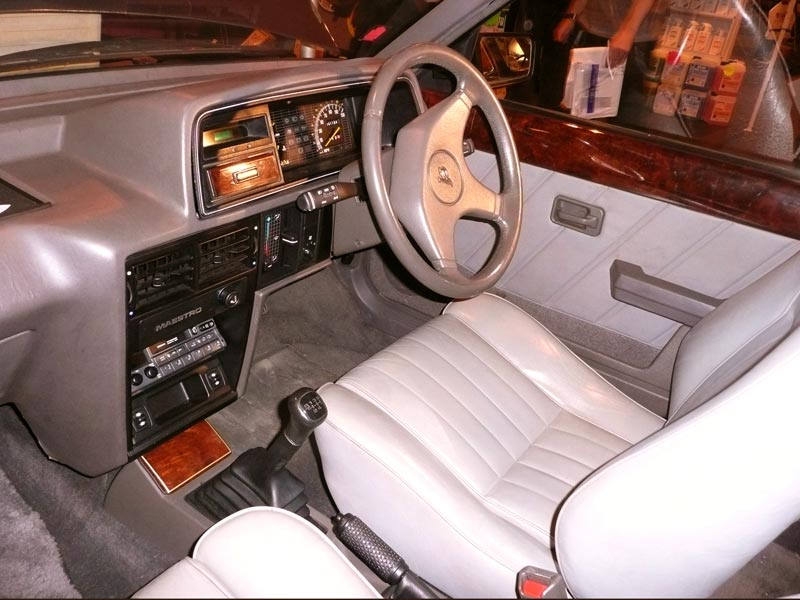
Maestro Vanden Plas interior

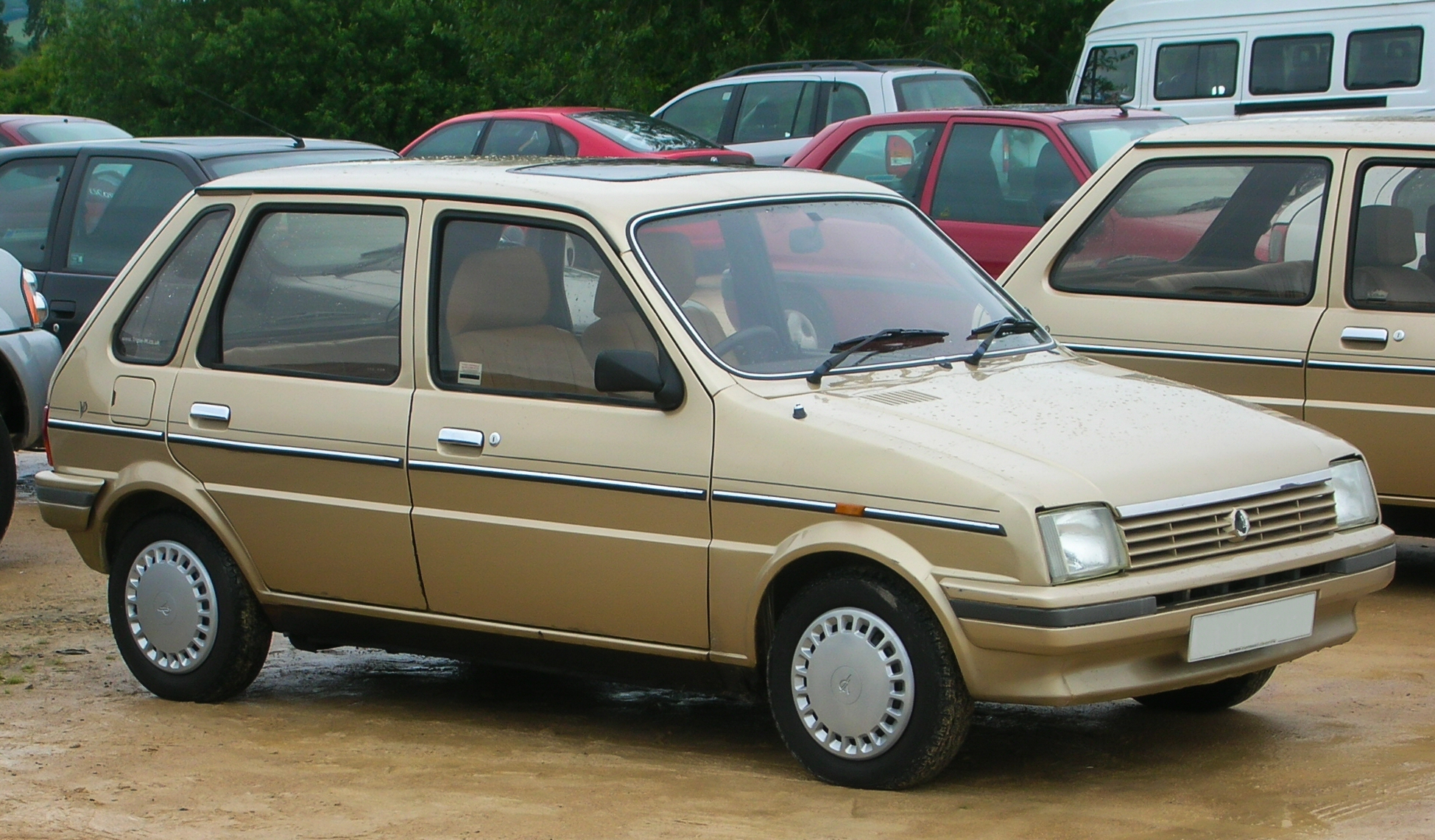
Metro Vanden Plas 1985

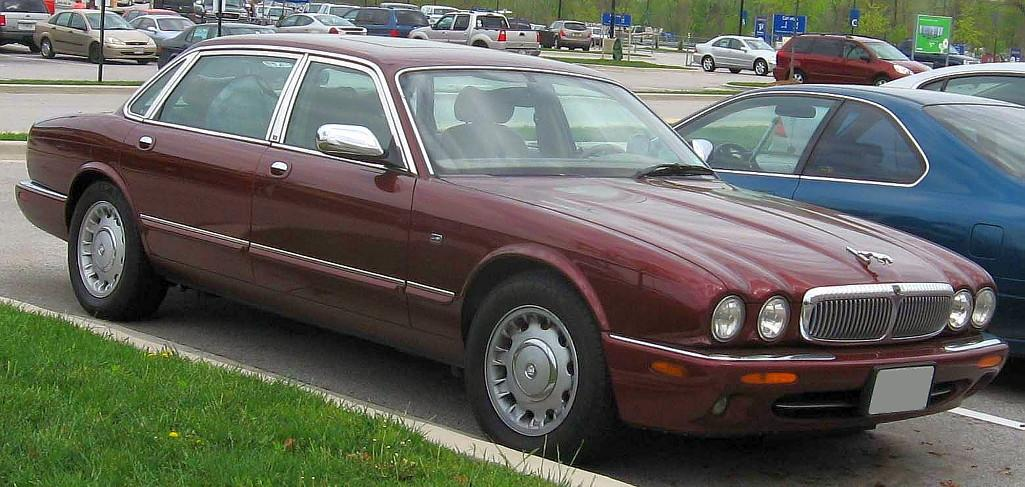
Daimler Super V8 badged Vanden Plas

In 1992, a Japanese company recreated the Vanden Plas 1100/1300 look on the Nissan Micra K11. This involved replicating the front and rear of the Vanden Plas, complete with two tone paint scheme as sported by the original model in the 1960s.

The last UK market British car to bear the Vanden Plas name was the Rover 75 at the beginning of the 21st century.

== China ==
The rights to the design of the Rover 75 cars and the MG Group (which had formerly been MG Rover) were purchased by a Chinese firm, Nanjing Automobile. Ford purchased the Rover name from the Rover Group's previous owner BMW to protect the Land Rover brand from Shanghai Automotive, who wanted the Rover name for their 75-based car (Ford was at this time owner of Land Rover and Jaguar). The Vanden Plas name (for outside North America) and many other Leyland names were purchased by Nanjing Automobile.

== See also ==
- Austin Sheerline
- Austin Princess
- List of car manufacturers of the United Kingdom
- Vanden Plas Owners Club
