= Charlesworth Bodies =

English coachbuilding business

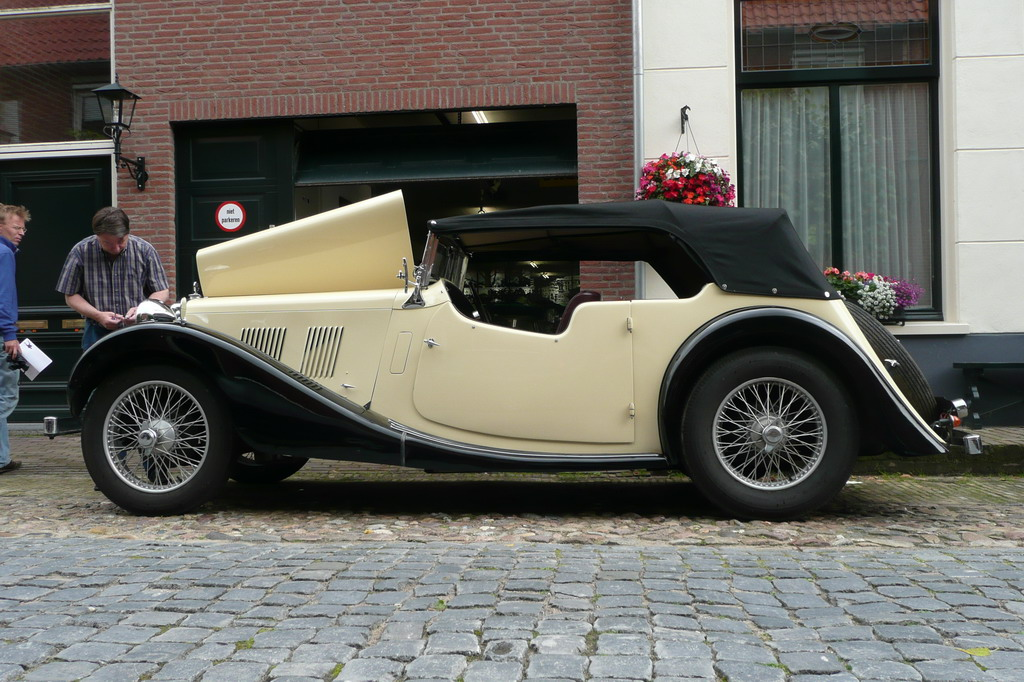
MG VA tourer 1938

Charlesworth Bodies Limited of Much Park Street, Coventry, owned a coachbuilding business that had been founded in 1907 by Charles Gray Hill and Charles Steane.

== Principal product ==
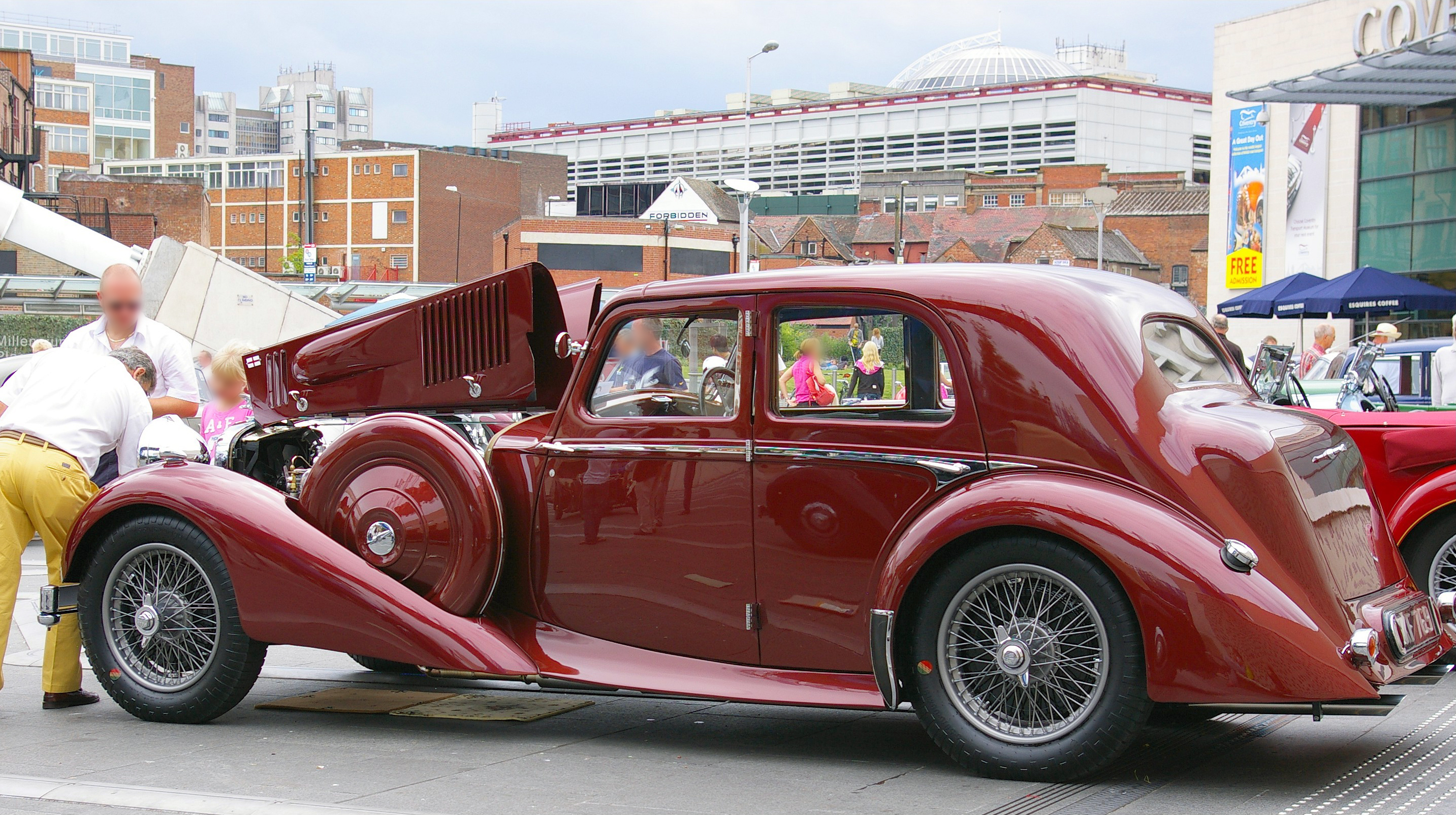
Alvis Speed Twenty-Five 1939

The company manufactured bodies in short runs for low-volume manufacturers including MG, Alvis, Armstrong Siddeley (at Parkside by Charlesworth), Brough Superior and Lea-Francis as well as on mass-market chassis from Hillman and Singer. They also made bespoke bodies on chassis such as Daimler, and light commercial bodies such as vans.

== Burlington Carriage ==
The Burlington Carriage Company Limited, (associated with Siddeley-Deasy) although independent, operated from an office in Charlesworth's premises at Parkside around the time of the First World War, then became an Armstrong Siddeley subsidiary.

== Sale ==
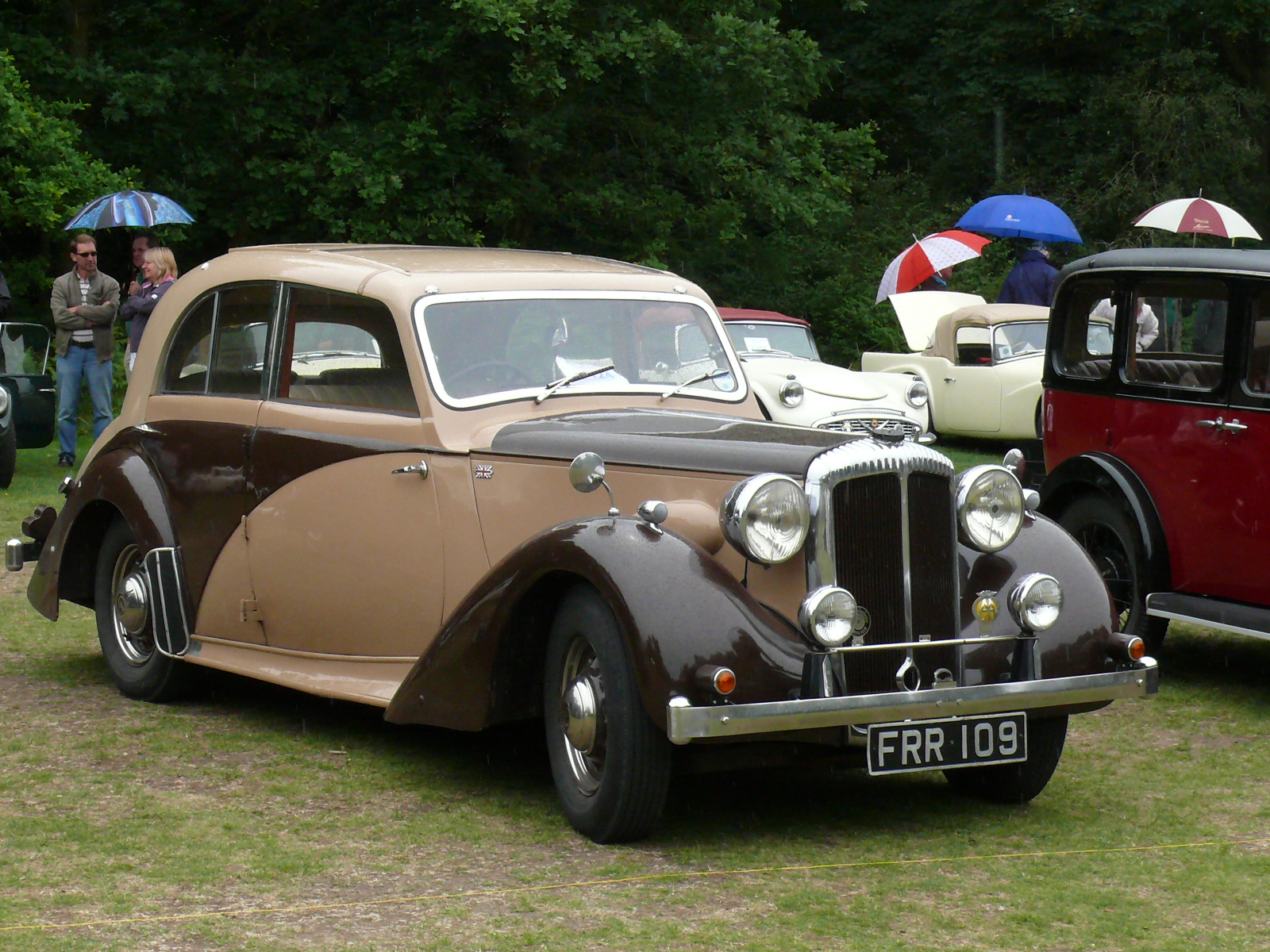
Bespoke body on Daimler Dolphin, 1940

When fabric bodies were in fashion in the 1920s and early 1930s they held a licence from Weymann The business was advertised for sale "as a going concern" in April 1927 "due to the death of a director". The description states that the premises are freehold and contain approximately 6,000 square yards in the heart of the city, equipped with all modern machinery for carrying on the trade. "The business shows substantial profits over a considerable period." In 1931 the company was liquidated and a new owner of the business incorporated, Charlesworth Bodies (1931) Limited, which soon was permitted to drop the (1931).

The Charlesworth house style of the early 1930s was low rooflines with compound curves and deep moulded waistlines.

== Second World War ==
During the Second World War Charlesworth manufactured aircraft components; their operations included a factory in Gloucestershire and Cecil Kimber was then among their staff. In early 1946 a series of small display advertisements offered "Superior Car Renovation" in the light of the postwar car shortage.

Charlesworth continued to make bodies after the Second World War, including Daimlers of various sizes. It appears the company's records have been destroyed since it went out of business in about 1950.
