= Cross & Ellis =

British coachbuilder

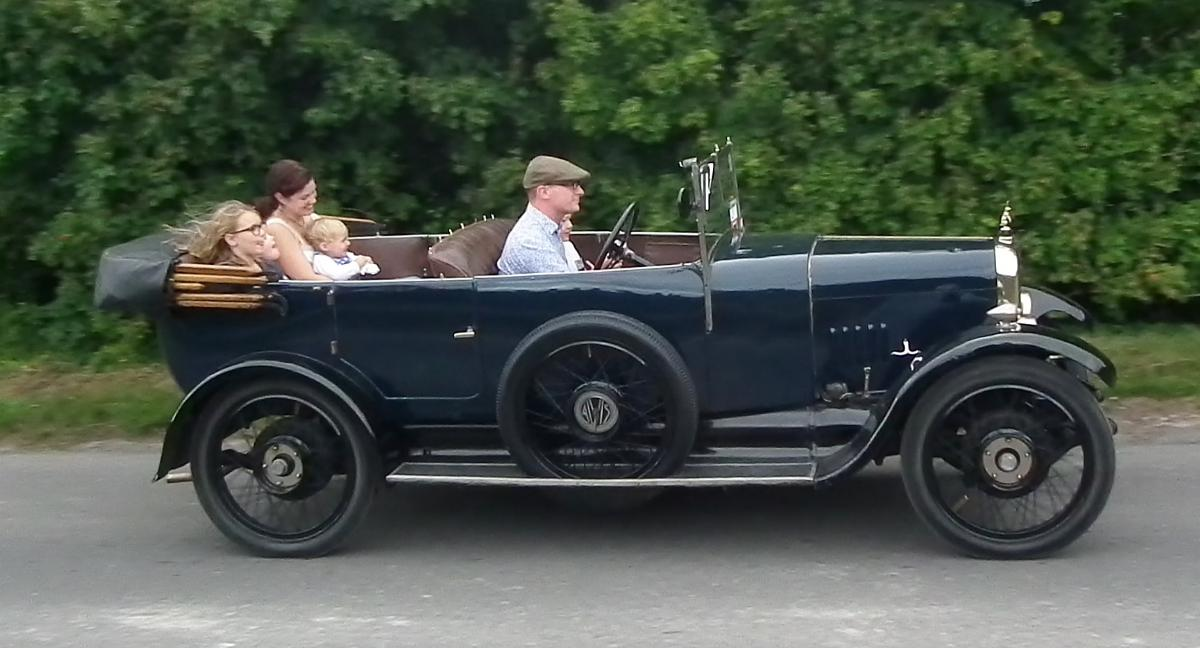
Cross & Ellis coachwork on an Alvis 12/50

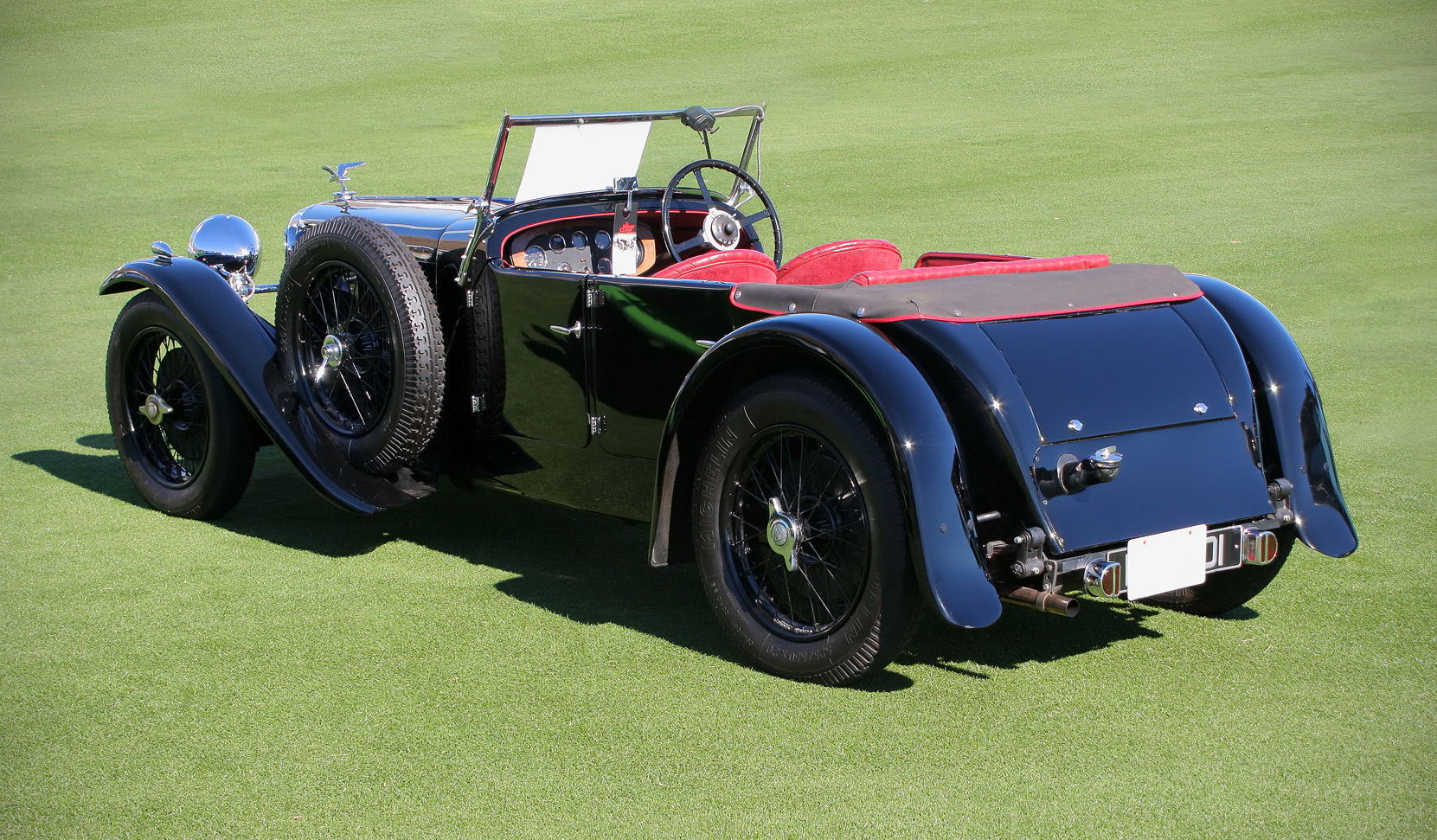
Cross & Ellis coachwork on an Alvis Speed 20A Sport Tourer

Cross & Ellis was a British vehicle coachbuilder. It was founded in Coventry in 1919 and continued in operation until 1938.

Harry Cross and Alf Ellis worked together in the bodyshop at the Daimler Company factory in Coventry during World War I. In 1919 they went into business together in a works in Stoke Row, Coventry making motor cycle sidecars at first before also making commercial vehicle bodies and then car bodies.

They were major suppliers to the Coventry companies Alvis making their first car body for their 10/30 model in 1921 and Lea-Francis.

In 1934 they were trying to widen their customer base and took their own stand at the London Motor Show and exhibited a coupe built on a Triumph Gloria chassis. This was followed by saloon bodies on Hillman, Humber and Wolseley chassis.

In the mid-1930s falling sales and a squeeze on prices led Cross and Ellis to start taking losses and in 1938 they went into liquidation.
