= Mayfair Carriage Co =

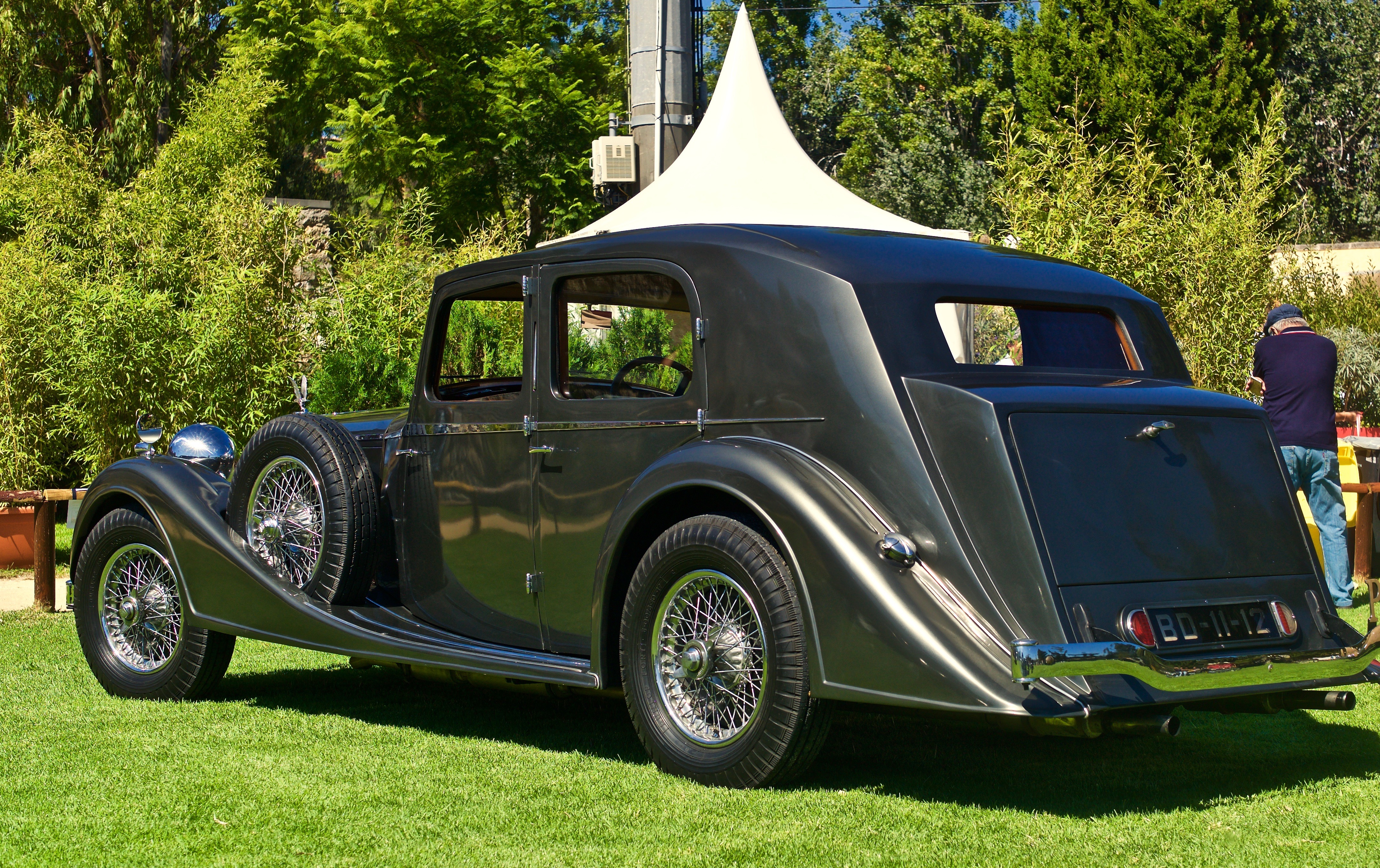
1935 sports saloon on an Alvis chassis

Mayfair Carriage Co Limited owned a London coachbuilder and dealer in second hand large cars in Kilburn then, from 1934, at The Hyde, Edgware Road NW9.

Mayfair entered business in 1925 using the name Progressive Coach and Motor Co Limited changing to Mayfair Carriage in 1929. Its origins were in a firm called Motor Car Industries which split in the early 1920s. One partner began this business and the other began a different business that became Carlton Carriage Co.

Early Mayfair bodies were built on imported Buick and Minerva chassis then, after the onset of the Great Depression, locally made Humber and Wolseley chassis.

Alvis became very important to Mayfair's business and Mayfair designed and built many elegant Alvis saloons, limousines, sports saloons and drophead coupés. By the outbreak of war in 1939 Mayfair had dropped building bodies for cars but continued building commercial bodies into the 1950s. The business closed in the 1970s.
