= Alvis TD 21 =

Alvis Three Litre Series II TD 21
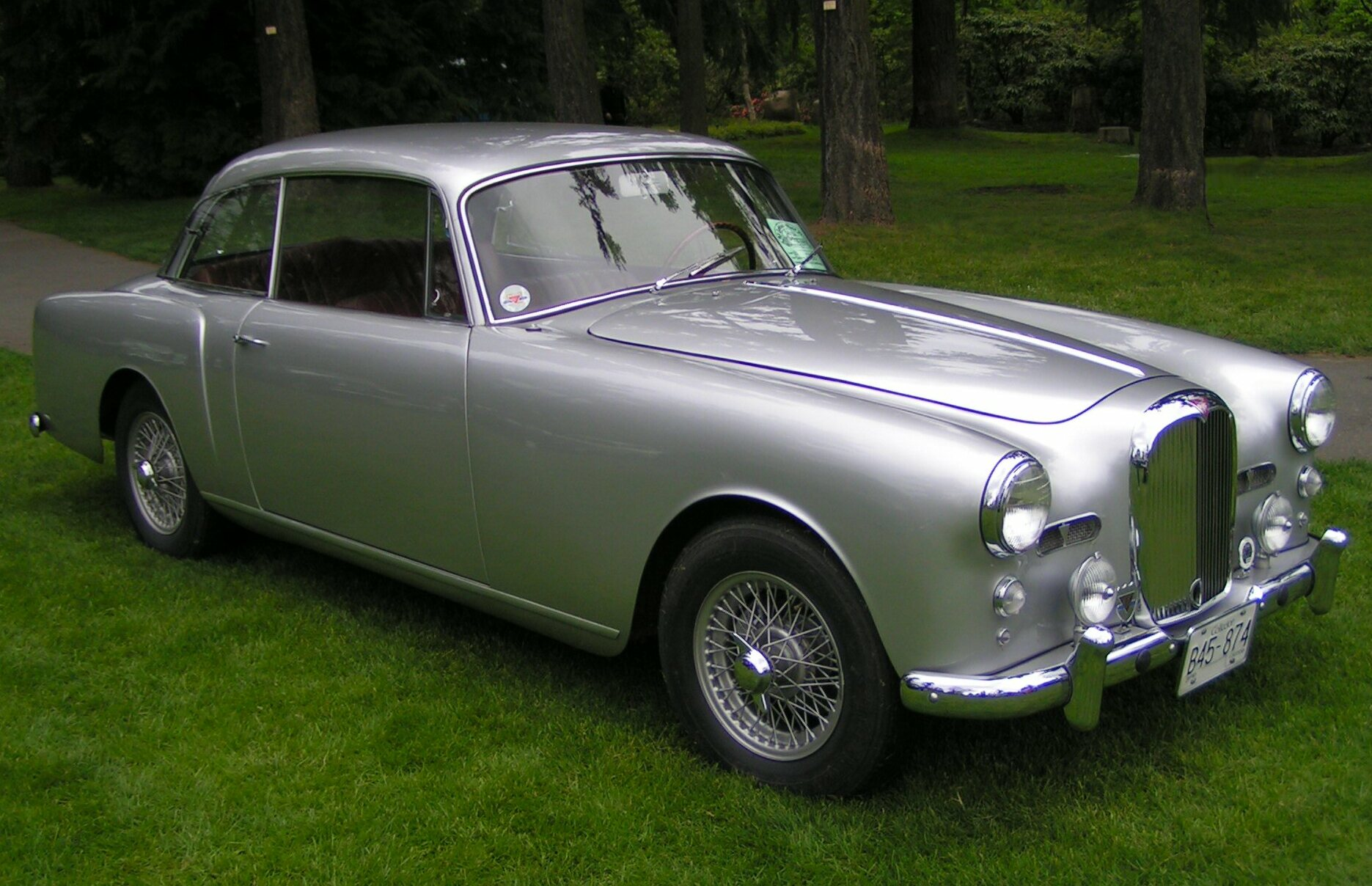
- Three Litre TD 21 fixed head coupé or 2-door sports saloon

Overview
- Manufacturer: Alvis Cars
- Production: Series I: 1958–1961; 784 built Series II: 1962–1963; 285 built
- Assembly: United Kingdom: Coventry, England

Body and chassis
- Body style: 4-seat fixed head or drophead coupé
- Layout: FR layout

Powertrain
- Engine: Alvis 3.0 L Straight-6
- Transmission: 4 speed manual, automatic

Dimensions
- Wheelbase: 111.5 in (2,832 mm)
- Length: 188.5 in (4,788 mm)
- Width: 66 in (1,676 mm)
- Height: 57 in (1,448 mm)

Chronology
- Predecessor: Alvis TC 108G
- Successor: Three Litre series III

The Alvis Three Litre Series II, also known as TD21, was a British sports saloon or coupé made by Alvis Car between the end of 1958 and October 1963. It was a revised version of the TC 108G, the body was made by Park Ward who were better able to supply them to the quantity, quality, and price required. The cars were slightly taller and a drop-head coupé was added to the range. They were both lighter.

The 2993 cc engine was again uprated, now producing 115 bhp (86 kW) mainly by an improved cylinder head and increasing the compression ratio from 8.0:1 to 8.5:1. A new four speed gearbox from the Austin-Healey appeared and Borg Warner three speed automatic transmission was offered. Overdrive was available on the manual transmission from late 1960 to 1962. Suspension was similar to the TC 21, independent at the front using coil springs with leaf springs at the rear but the track was increased by 1 in (25 mm) to 55.5 in (1,410 mm) and a front anti roll bar added. Wire spoked wheels became an option. From 1959 the all drum brake set up was changed to discs at the front retaining drums at the rear.

A car with manual transmission was tested by the British magazine The Motor in 1960 and had a top speed of 103 mph (166 km/h) and could accelerate from 0-60 mph (97 km/h) in 13.5 seconds. A fuel consumption of 20.2 miles per imperial gallon (14.0 L/100 km; 16.8 mpg_{‑US}) was recorded. The test car cost £2827 including taxes.

== Series II ==
In April 1962 the car was upgraded with four wheel Dunlop disc brakes in place of the disc/drum combination and named Series II. Door frames were now constructed of aluminium for lightness as well as being panelled in aluminium to alleviate persistent problems with the Park Ward body's wooden door pillar.

The previously stand-alone fog lamps were built into the front of the car, recessed in the middle of new circular air intakes, one for the heater, the other for the carburettors. The rear number plate and the various lamps and reversing lights were re-arranged.

In October that year there was a switch to a five speed manual, all syncromesh ZF gearbox; the Borg-Warner automatic remained available as an option.

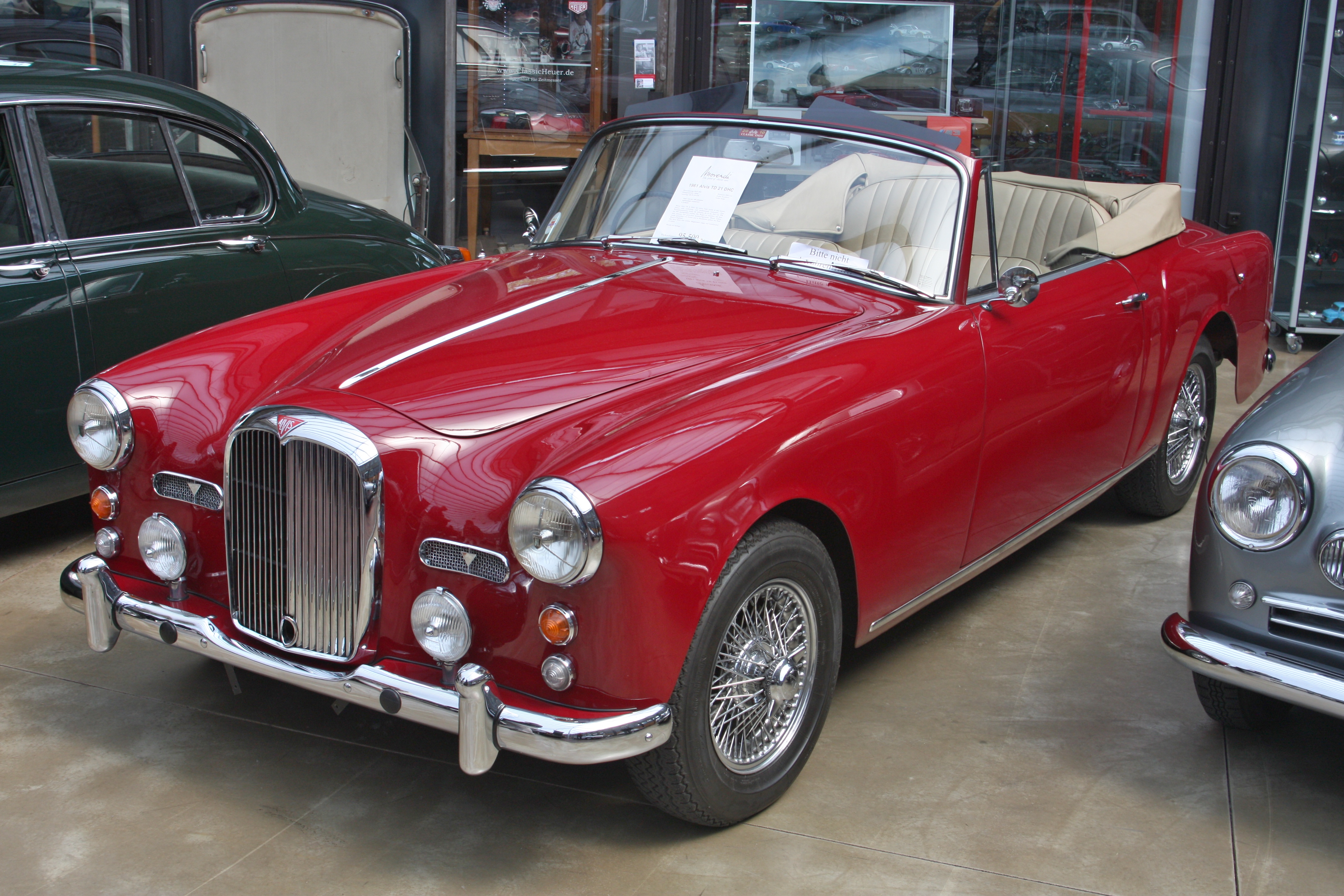
series I

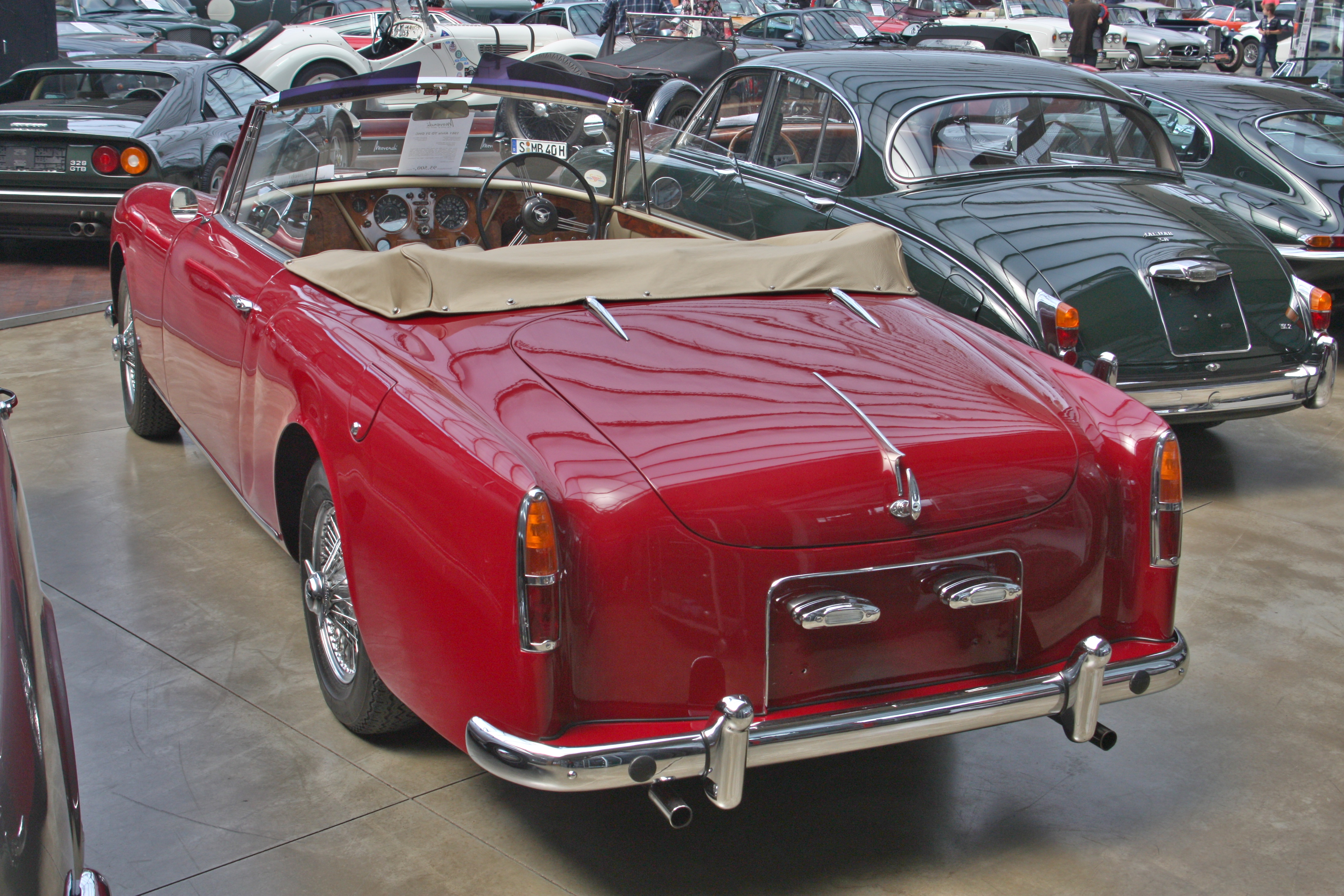
series I

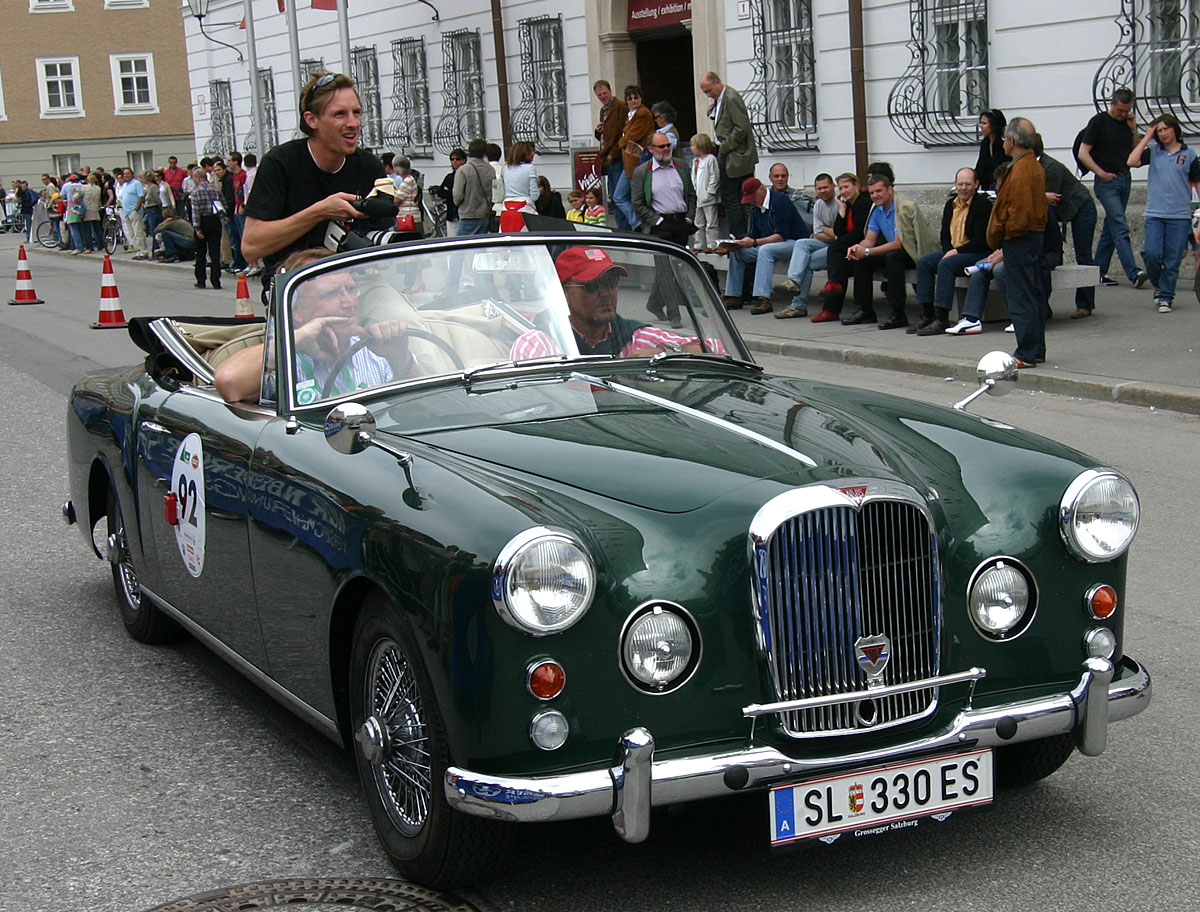
series II

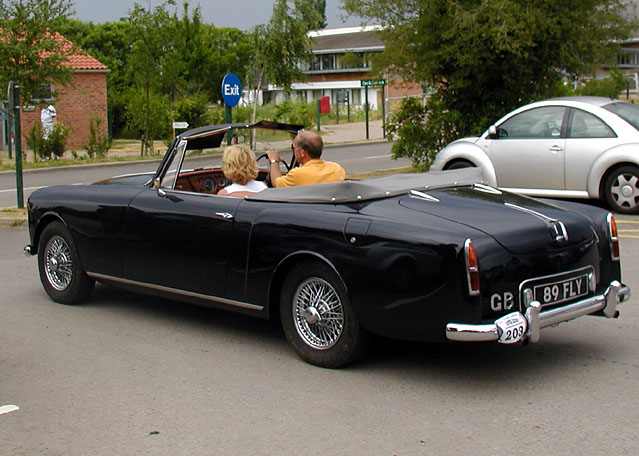
series II

== Graber Switzerland ==
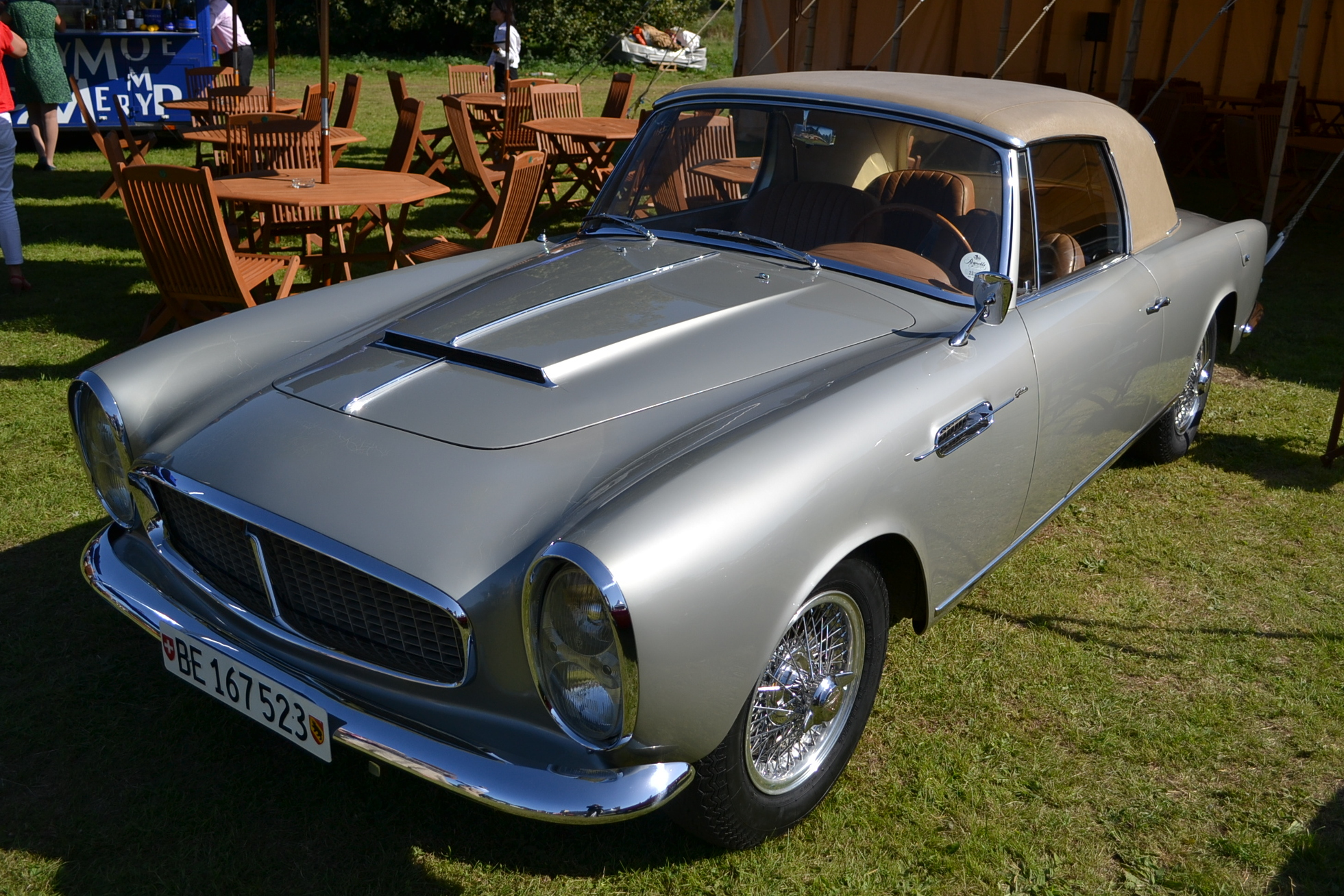
1963 Three Litre Series II TD21 cabriolet by Hermann Graber

Graber continued to mount their own bodies on the Alvis chassis.

== In popular culture ==
A Series II Alvis TD21 features heavily throughout the historical crime novel set in 1973 The Nicholas Duncan Mysteries : Everyday by Stuart Tidman (2022, ISBN 978-1-80074-321-2 ), as the vehicle of choice of the afore-named lead character, a Detective Sergeant in the Coventry Police.

A sky blue 1959 Series I Alvis TD21 is the vehicle in which former spy Jim Prideaux, now a teacher, instructs one of his students William to drive, claiming it to be "the best car in England", in the 2011 film 'Tinker Tailor Soldier Spy'.
