= Alvis TE 21 =

Alvis Three Litre Series III TE 21
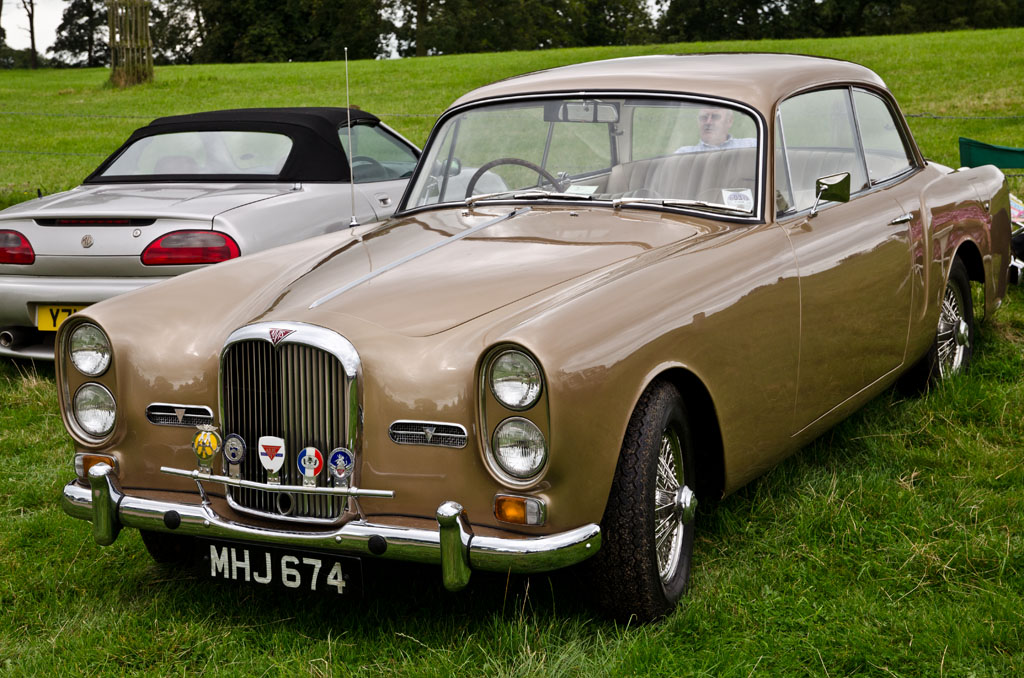
- Three Litre series III 1963

Overview
- Manufacturer: Alvis Cars
- Production: 1963–1966; 352 produced
- Assembly: United Kingdom: Coventry, England

Body and chassis
- Body style: 2 door saloon 2 door drophead
- Layout: FR layout
- Related: Chassis continued to be sold to Graber Switzerland for Graber's own bodies

Powertrain
- Engine: Alvis 3.0 L Straight-6

Dimensions
- Wheelbase: 111.5 inches (2832 mm)
- Length: 189 inches (4800 mm)
- Width: 66 inches (1676 mm)
- Curb weight: 3,250 pounds (1,470 kg) (approx)

Chronology
- Predecessor: Three Litre series II
- Successor: Three Litre series IV

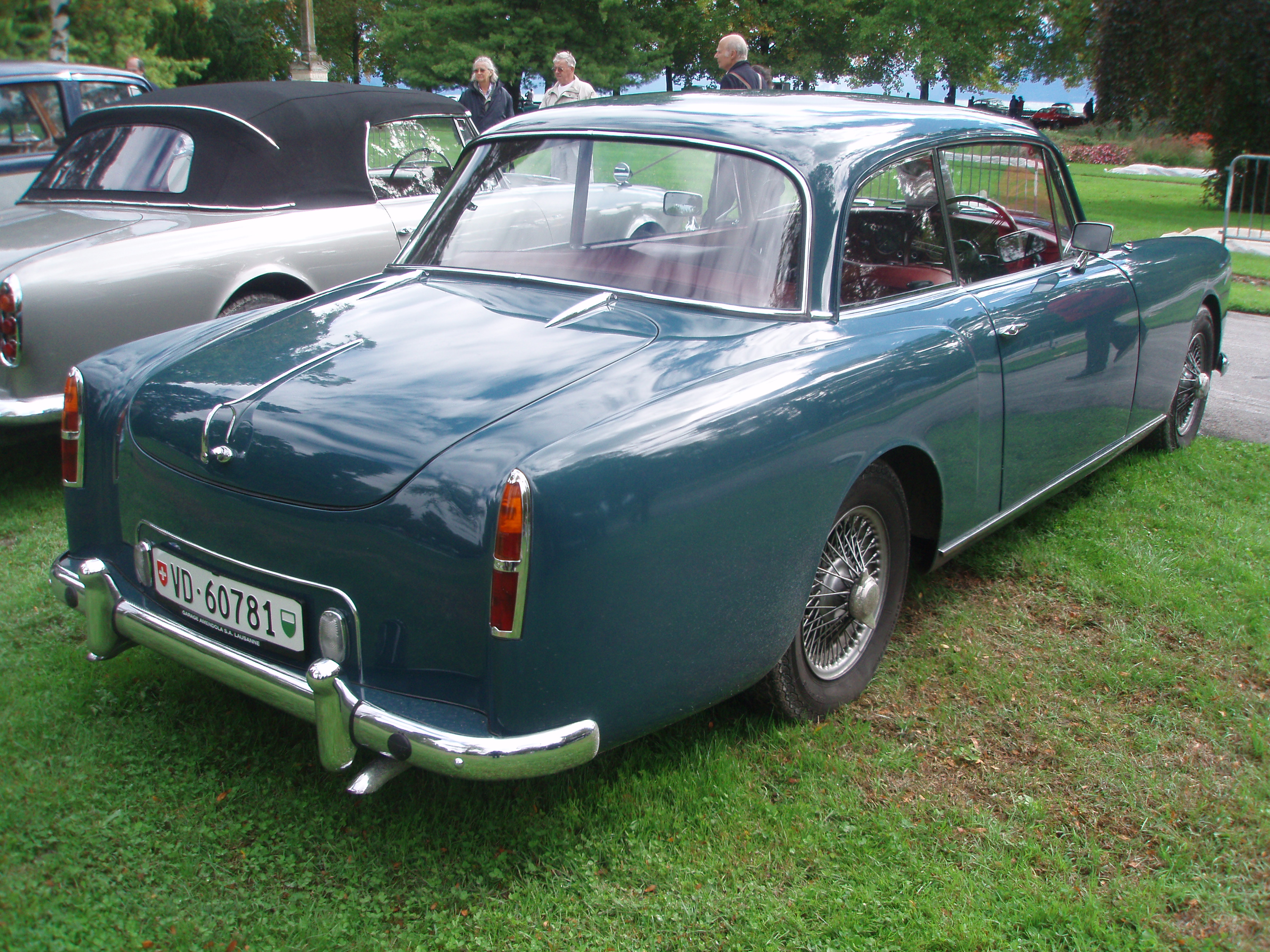
Swiss registered Park Ward bodied car

The Alvis Three Litre Series III sports saloon or drophead coupé, also known as TE 21, is a luxury automobile produced by British manufacturer Alvis between 1963 and 1966 with a body built by Mulliner Park Ward. It was an updated version of the 1958 TD21.

== Description ==
The body was a modified version of the TC 108G styled by Graber of Switzerland but built by Mulliner Park Ward and distinguished by having twin headlights mounted one above the other. Saloon and drophead versions were available. The design was noted for its lack of bright side trim or creases moulded into the body parts. The windshield was one-piece, curved, and not too highly sloped.

The 2993 cc engine, first used in the 1950 TA 21, received a modified cylinder head and manifold which increased power to 130 bhp (97 kW) at 4000 rpm giving the car a top speed of 107 mph (172 km/h). A choice of automatic or five speed gearbox made by ZF was available. Suspension was independent at the front using coil springs, with leaf springs at the rear. Disc brakes were fitted to all wheels.

Recirculating-ball-type steering gear was fitted to reduce effort and power steering became optional in late 1964.

Although the car was replaced by the TF 21 in 1966, the TE 21 was still in stock and "available to special order" until 1967.

== Specifications (1966 Model 3-litre Series III Saloon) ==
Engine Engine: six-cylinder, 2993 cc, 8.5 compression ratio, rated at 130 bhp (97 kW; 132 PS). Maximum speed: over 100 mph (160 km/h)

Chassis/body Overall length: 15.708 ft (4.788 m)
Overall width: 5.500 ft (1.676 m)
Height: 5.000 ft (1.524 m)
Turning circle: 39.000 ft (11.88 m)
Wheelbase: 9.292 ft (2.832 m)
Front track: 4.635 ft (1.413 m)
Rear track: 4.510 ft (1.375 m)
Fuel tank capacity: 14.3 imp gal (65 L; 17 US gal)
Empty weight: 2,900 pounds (1315 kg) approximately

== Graber Switzerland ==
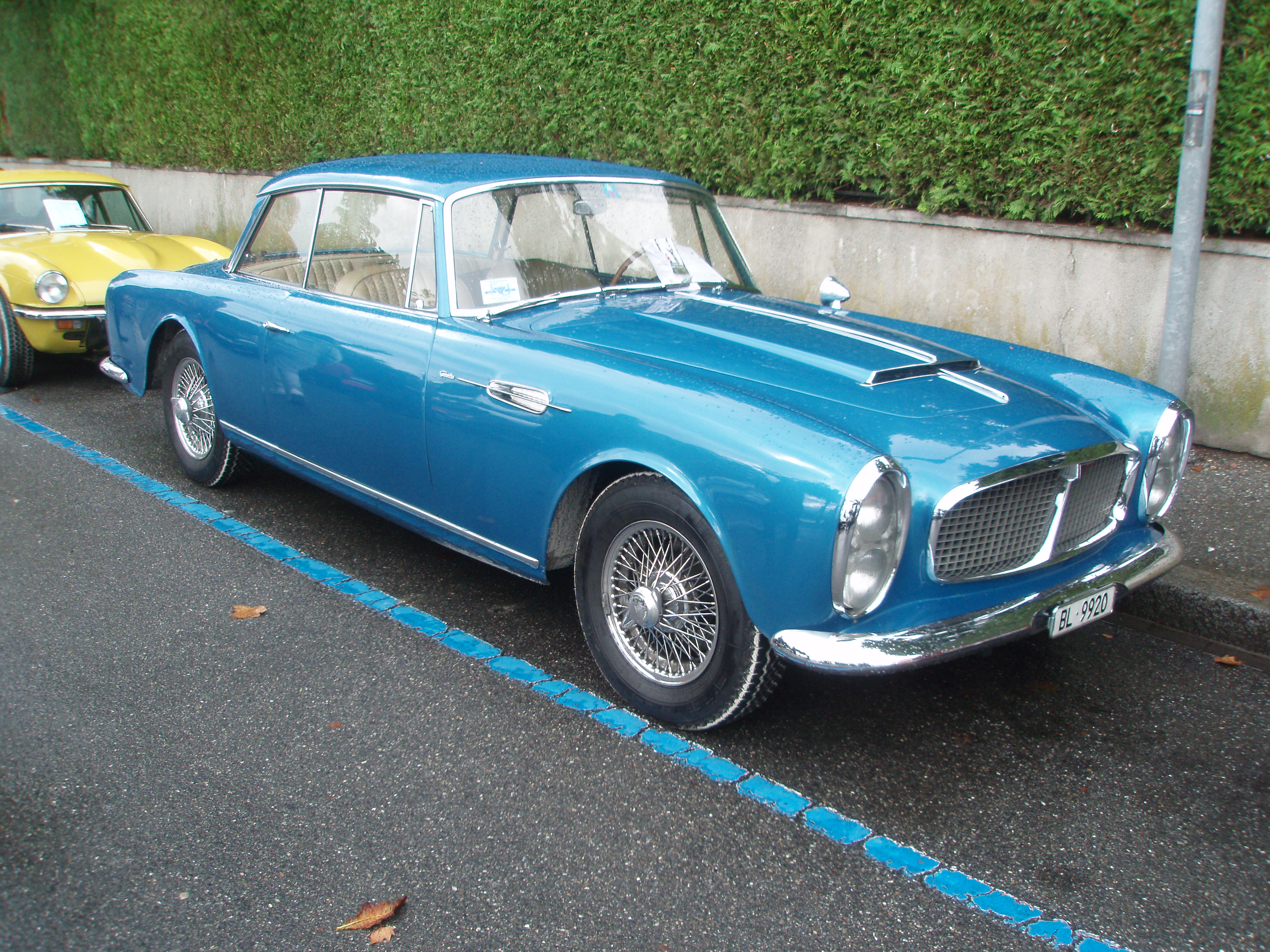
Graber's body on a TE 21 chassis 1964

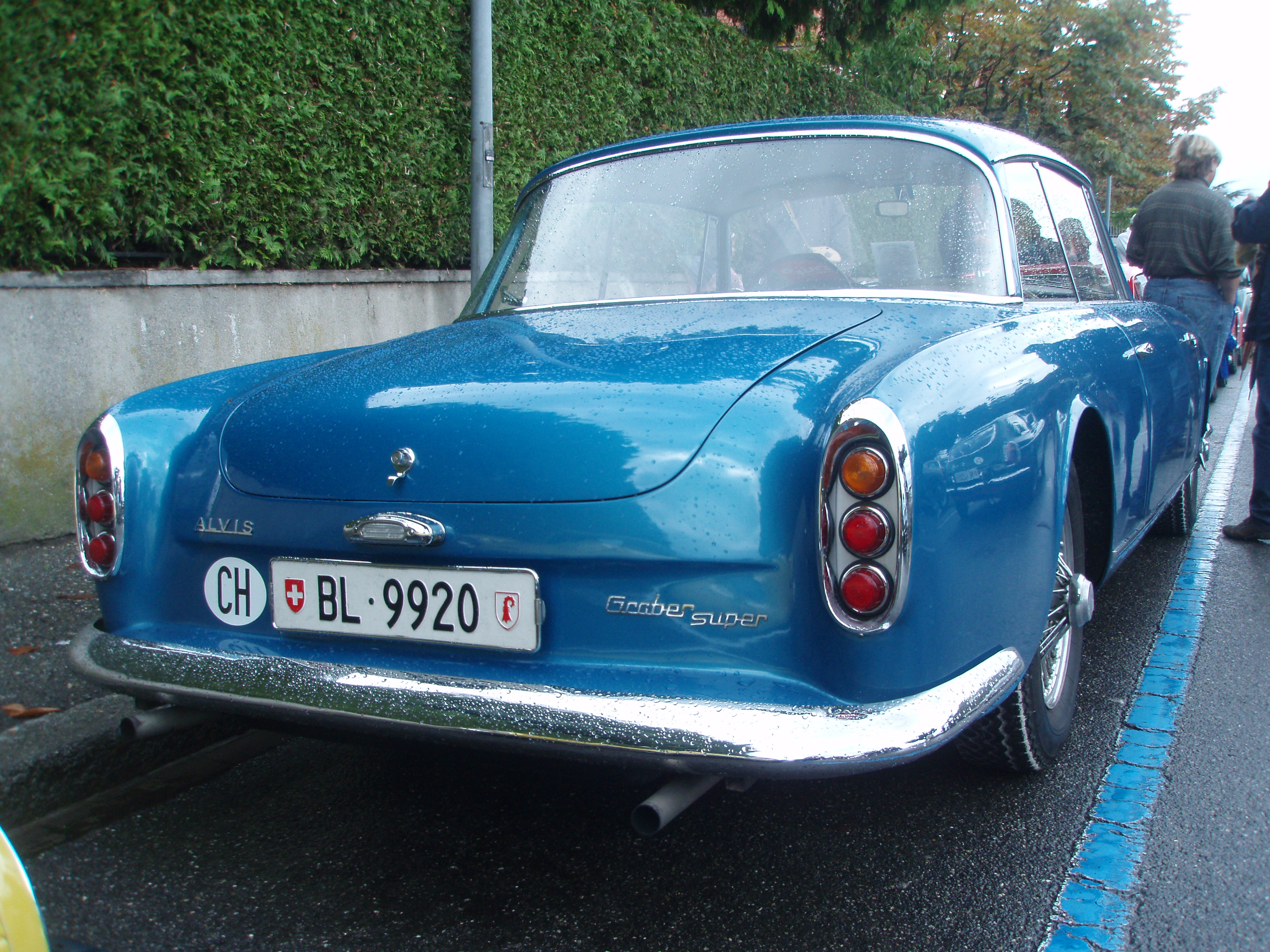

Carrosserie Hermann Graber continued to build their own bodies on the Alvis chassis.
