= Alvis TC 108G =

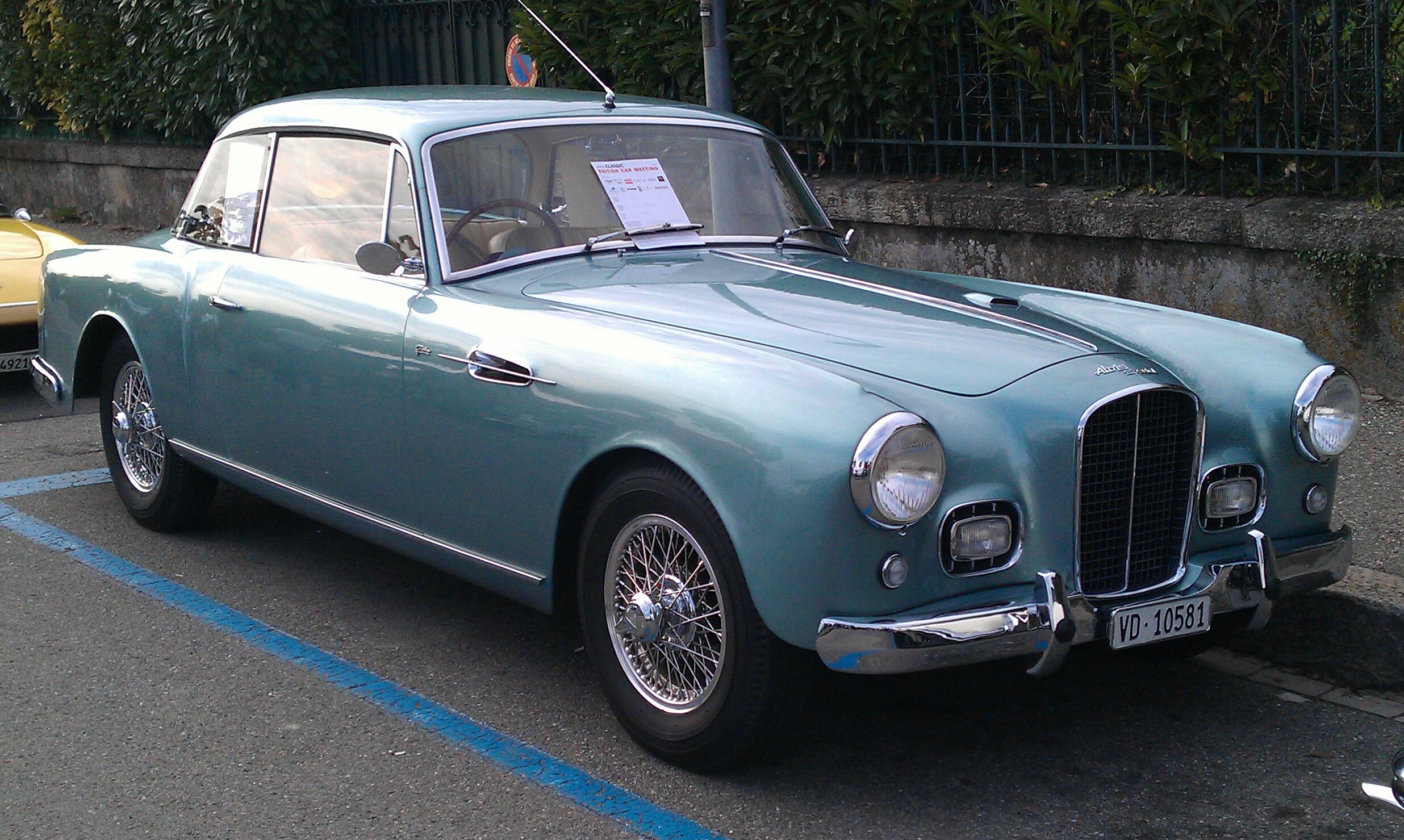
- A 1957 car with body by Graber

Overview
- Manufacturer: Alvis Cars
- Production: 1956–1958; 35 produced; 37 produced
- Assembly: United Kingdom: Coventry, England

Body and chassis
- Body style: 2 door saloon
- Layout: FR layout

Powertrain
- Engine: Alvis 3.0 L Straight-6
- Transmission: 4 speed manual

Dimensions
- Wheelbase: 111.5 in (2,832 mm)
- Length: 189 in (4,801 mm)
- Width: 66 in (1,676 mm)
- Height: 62.5 in (1,588 mm)

Chronology
- Predecessor: Alvis TC 21
- Successor: Alvis TD 21

The Alvis TC 108G is a British sporting car made by Alvis cars between 1956 and 1958. Coachbuilders Graber of Switzerland had produced some bodies for the TC21 that were much more up to date than the standard offering built for Alvis by Mulliners (Birmingham).

Mulliners production was becoming devoted to Standard Triumph —which purchased them in 1958— and Alvis's body supply had been getting difficult. Alvis's supplier of expensive drop head bodies was Tickford and they had been bought in 1955 by David Brown and his Aston Martin and Lagonda bodies had priority.

== New English body ==
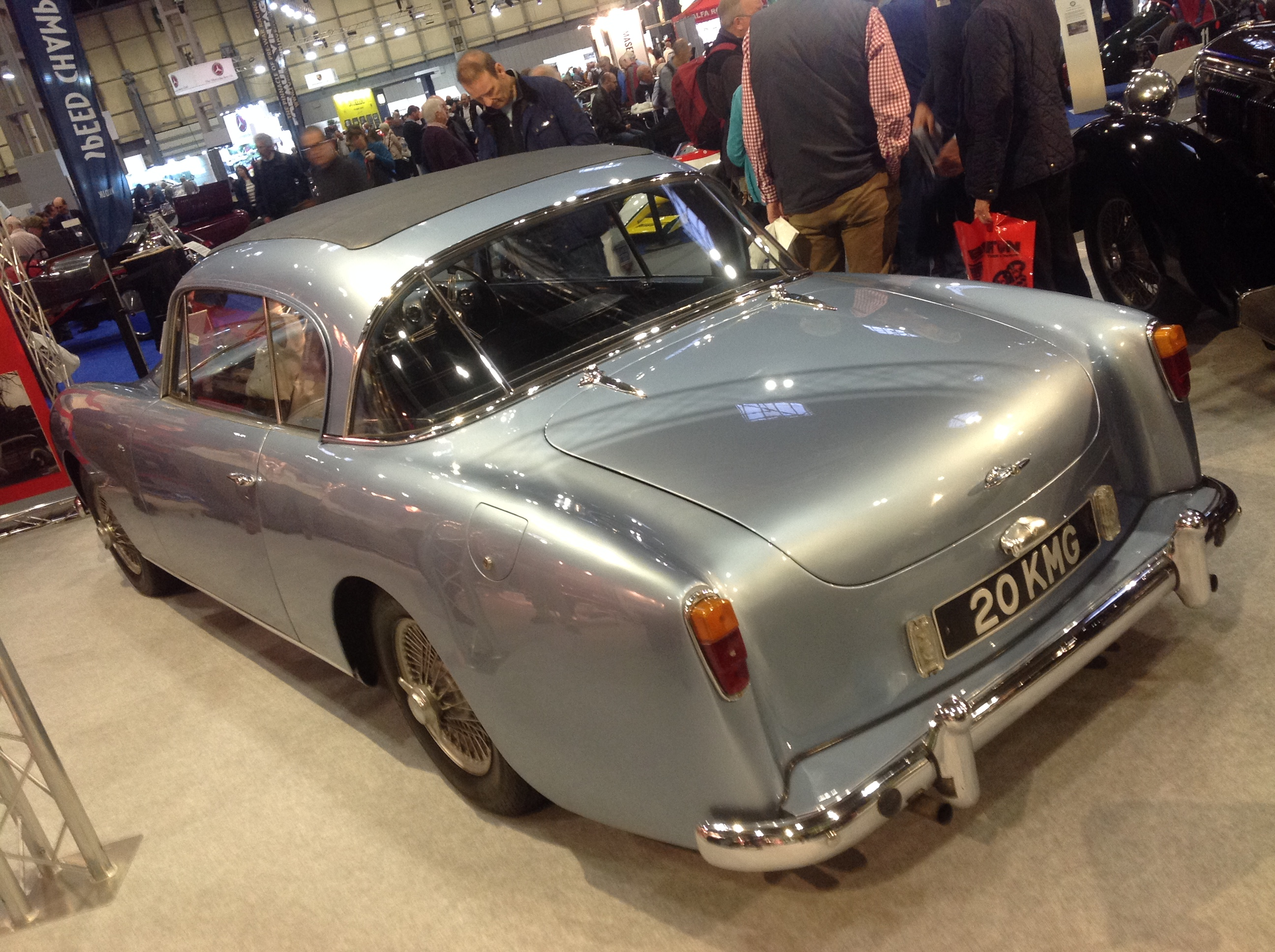
A 1957 car with body by Willowbrook

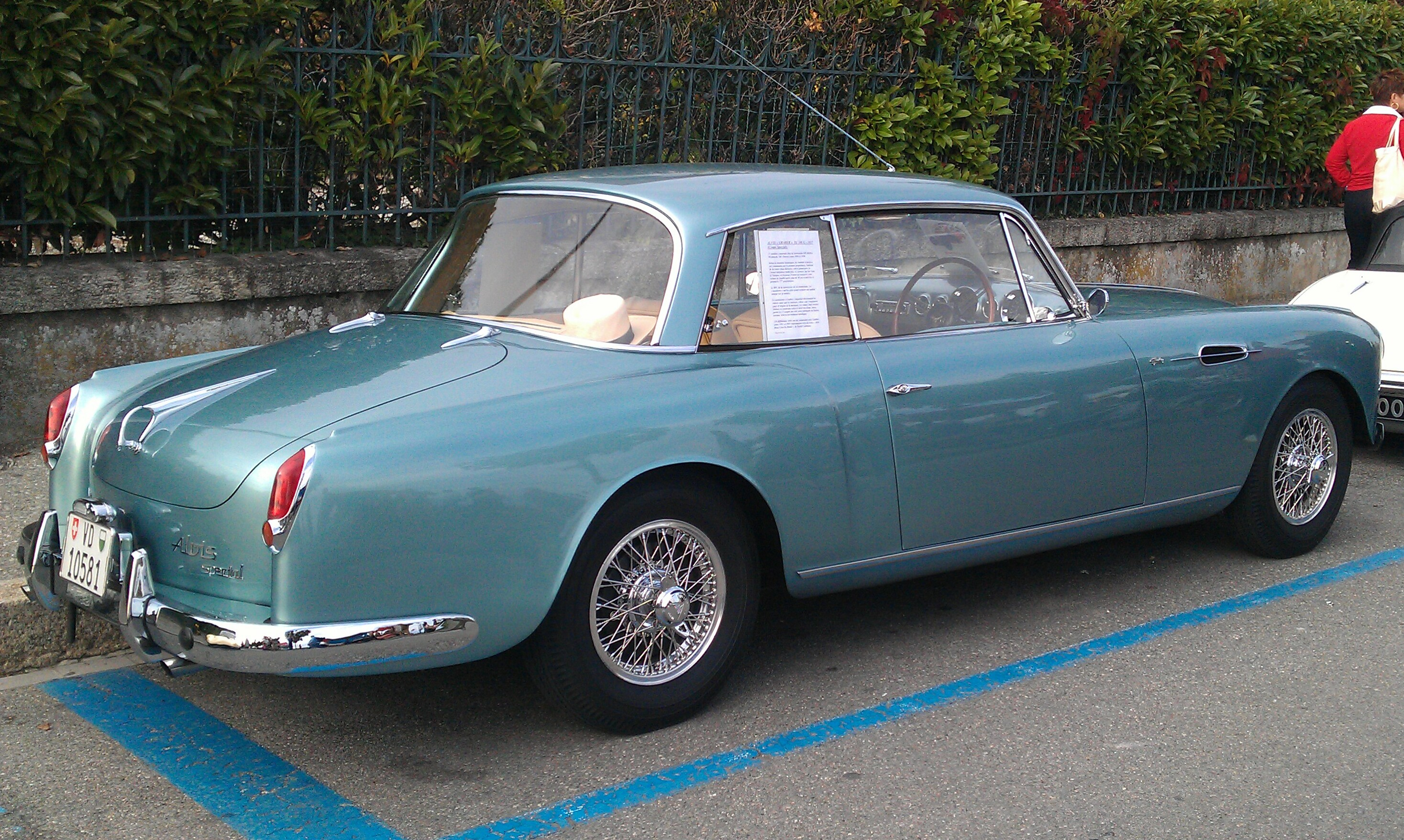
1957 Alvia TC 108G by Graber (rear)

It was therefore decided to make the Graber style (October 1955 Paris Motor Show car) the basis of a new model and the rights were bought resulting in the TC 108G. A contract to build the new bodies was placed with bus builder Willowbrook of Loughborough. The car was only available as a two-door, four-seat saloon made by forming metal around a traditional wooden frame. Graber later resumed production —probably at the request of Alvis— but modified the shape of their subsequent bodies.

The Willowbrook body proved to be too expensive and few were sold. The deal was terminated and a new contract placed with Park Ward Alvis having bought Graber's drawings, jigs etc. The new car was designated the TD21 and it entered production in October 1958.

The 2993 cc engine was uprated slightly to produce 104 bhp (78 kW) at 4,000 rpm by modifying the cylinder head and fitting twin SU carburettors. Suspension was the same as the TC 21, independent at the front using coil springs with leaf springs at the rear.

== Production ==
Chassis — 31 produced. Chassis numbers 25909-25945 (31 made -- some of these chassis numbers were not used).
Bodies — Willowbrook: 16

Graber: 8 (1955), 11 (1957)
