= Alvis TF 21 =

Alvis Three Litre series IV TF 21
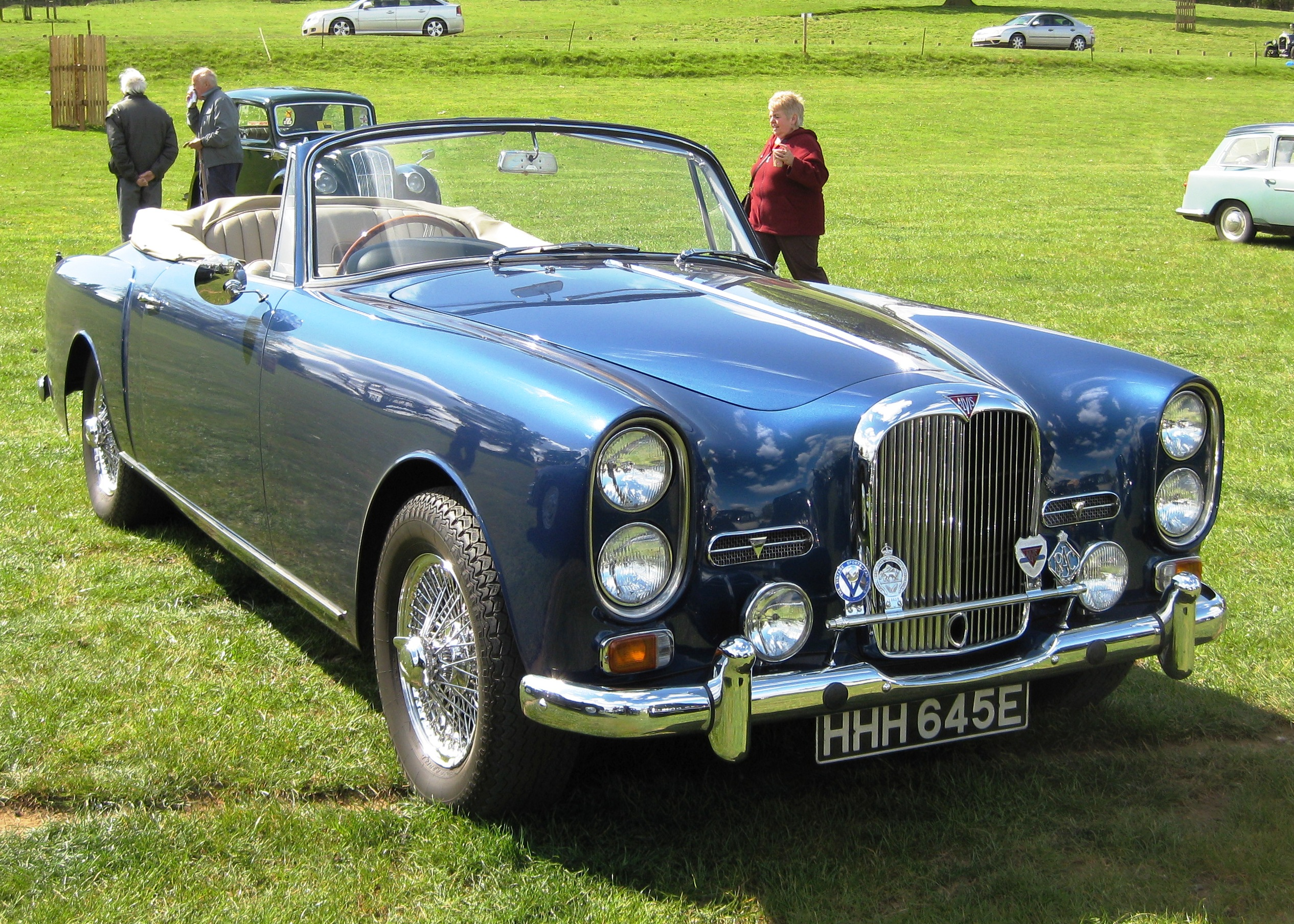
- Drophead coupé

Overview
- Manufacturer: Alvis Cars
- Production: 1966–1967; 106 produced
- Assembly: United Kingdom: Coventry, England

Body and chassis
- Body style: 2 door saloon 2 door drophead
- Layout: FR layout

Powertrain
- Engine: 3.0 L I6

Dimensions
- Wheelbase: 111.5 in (2,830 mm)
- Length: 189 in (4,800 mm)
- Width: 66 in (1,700 mm)
- Curb weight: 3,250 pounds (1,470 kg) (approx)

Chronology
- Predecessor: Three Litre series III
- Successor: none

The Alvis Three Litre Series IV, also known as TF21, an updated version of the 1963 TE21, was the last car produced by Alvis Cars. Having been announced at the Geneva Motor Show in March 1966 it remained in production until 1967.

Externally, the car was identical to the TE21, but there were some changes to the suspension, and, inside, the instruments were better organised.

The 2993 cc engine, first used in the 1950 TA21, had its power increased to 150 bhp (112 kW) at 4750 rpm by fitting triple SU carburettors, giving the car a top speed of 120 mph (193 km/h). A choice of automatic or five-speed gearbox made by ZF was available.

The chassis and suspension continued with front coil springs and leaf springs at the rear. Disc brakes were fitted to all wheels and recirculating ball-type steering gear was used with power assistance optional.

Although this car was an update of the TE21, the TE21 remained available to special order until 1967. In August 1967, it was announced that production of the Park Ward bodied Alvis 3-litre had ceased.

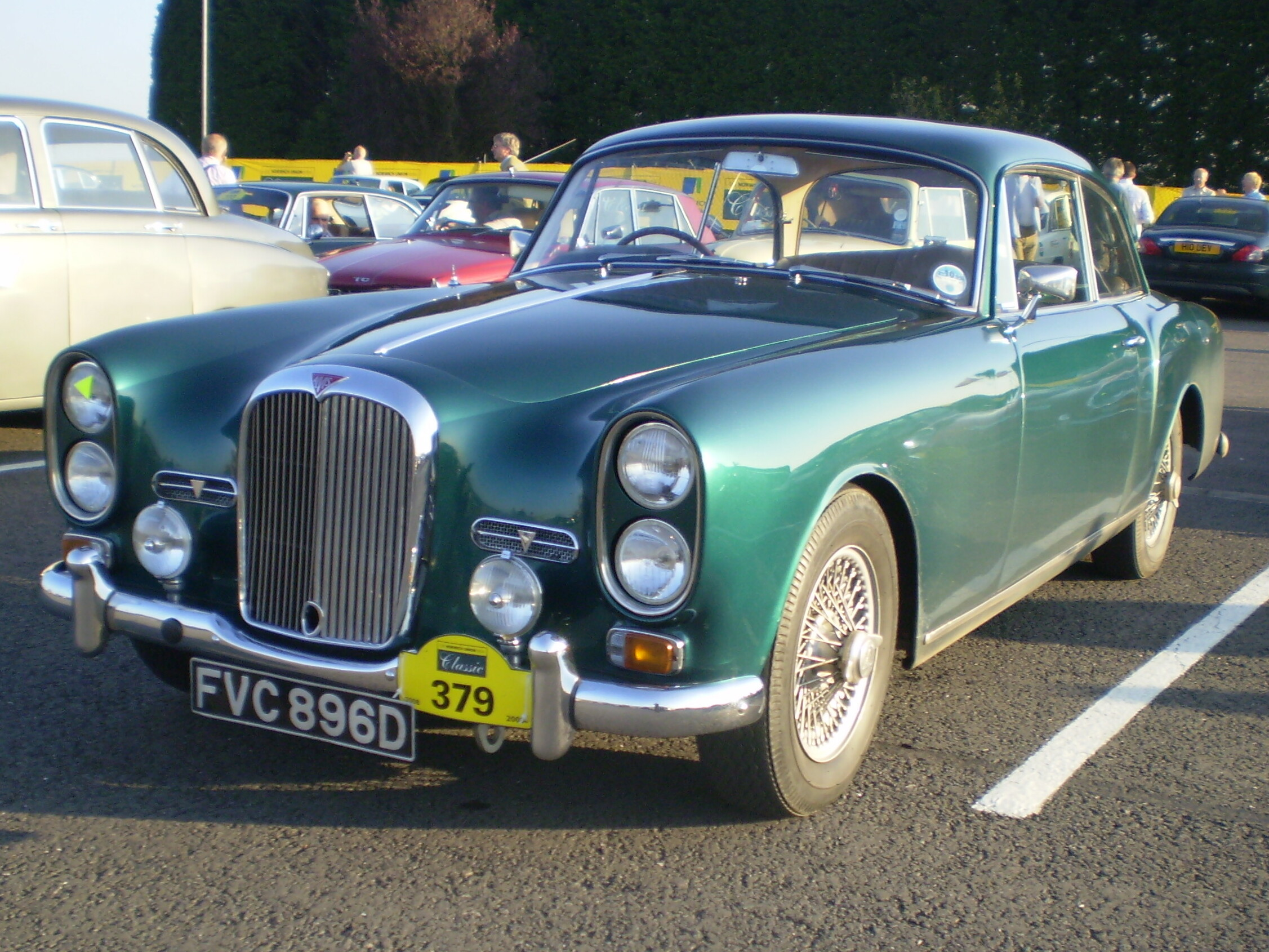
Fixed head coupé, the second car built

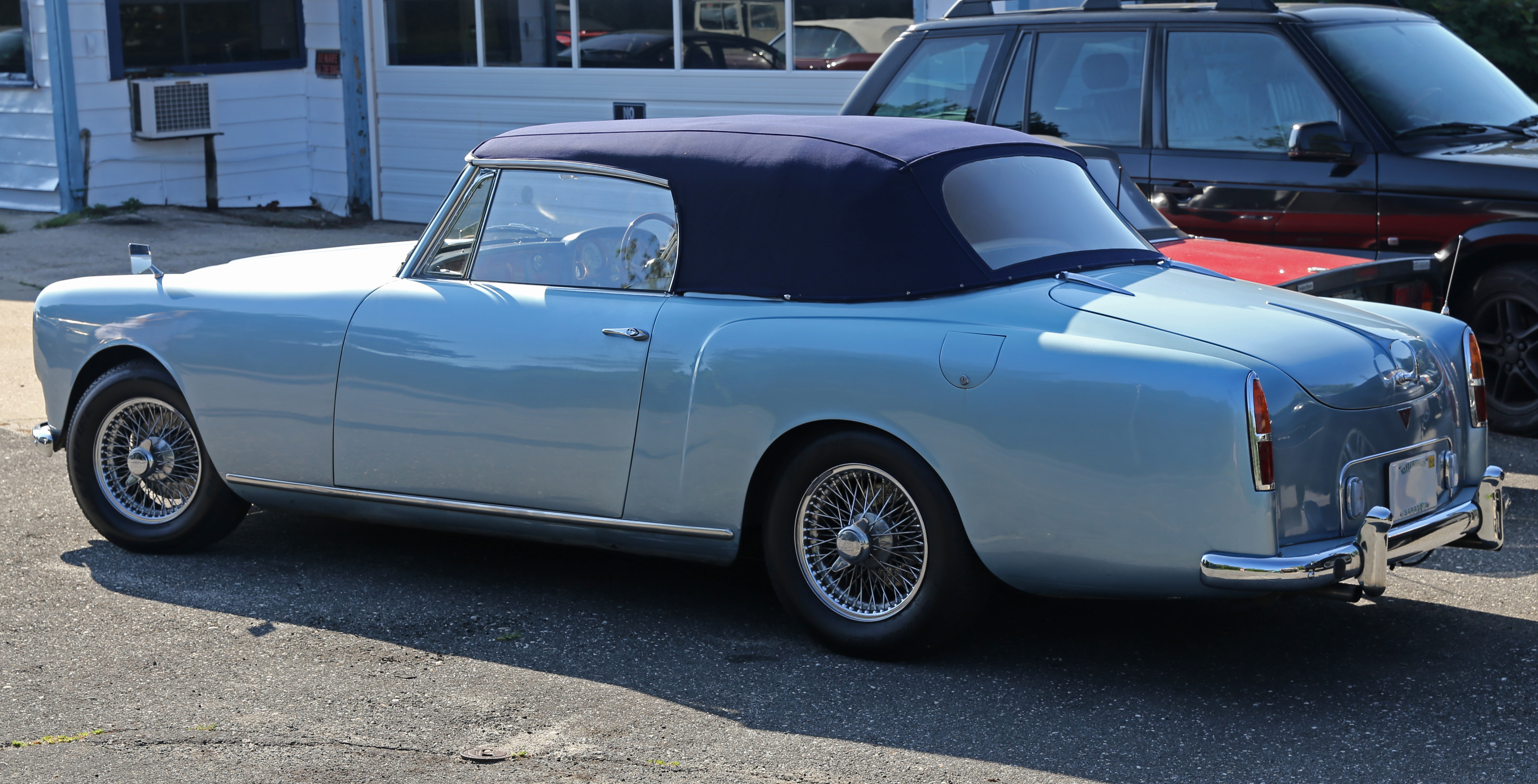
Rear view of a Drophead coupé (#27372, the first TF21 built)
