= ZF S6-650 transmission =

6-speed manual transmission

The ZF S6-650 is a 6-speed manual transmission manufactured by ZF Friedrichshafen AG. It is designed for longitudinal engine applications, and is rated to handle up to 705 N⋅m (520 lb⋅ft) of torque.

General Motors used the S6 as RPO ML6.

Gear ratios:

1	2	3	4	5	6	R
5.79	3.31	2.10	1.31	1.00	0.72	5.23

== Applications ==
- 2001–2006 Chevrolet Silverado 2500HD and 3500
- 2001–2006 GMC Sierra 2500HD and 3500
- 1999–2010 Ford Super Duty F-250, F-350, F-450 & F-550 (with diesel engines)
- 2002–2010 Ford Super Duty F-250, F-350, F-450 & F-550 (with gas engines)

== Bellhousing variants ==
- 7.3 Powerstroke (same as 7.3/6.9 IDI bellhousing)
- 6.0 Powerstroke (larger bellhousing than automatic variant)
- 6.4 Powerstroke (ZF S6-750)
- 5.4/6.8 Triton (same bellhousing as automatic 6.0/6.4 Powerstroke)
- 6.6 Duramax
- 8.1 Vortec V8

== Significance ==
ZF introduced the S6-650 in 1998 on the Ford Super Duty. GM started using the ZF S6-650 in 2001 with some alterations, making this transmission different from the Ford version.

The S6-650 will likely be the last manual transmission GM and Ford will use in their heavy pick ups, due to advancements in automatic transmission technology and low consumer demand for manual transmissions. However, Ford did offer the Tremec TR-4050 transmission until 2019.

== Issues ==
The gasoline version of the ZF6 and ZF5 is known to have poor casting issues, especially around the transmission mounts. This can lead to the mounting ears breaking off. Other issues include the older version of the shift fork not being as strong as the updated variant.

=== Construction ===
The ZF S6-650 – Heavy Duty 6 speed manual transmission has an aluminium alloy main gear case and tail housing with the bell housing integral to the case. It is built in two-wheel drive and four-wheel drive versions. The model used in the Ford trucks has an internal oil pump to circulate and cool the lubricant, which is uncommon in manual transmissions. The GM versions are not equipped with an oil pump. All gears are synchronized. There is a dual cone synchronizer on 2nd and 3rd gears with an input torque rating of 710 N⋅m (520 lb⋅ft).

== See also ==
- List of ZF transmissions
