= Willowbrook (bus manufacturer) =

Former British bus body manufacturer

- Industry: Automotive
- Founded: 1927
- Defunct: 1983
- Headquarters: Loughborough, England
- Products: Bus bodies
- Owner: Duple Coachbuilders

Willowbrook was an English bus bodybuilder. Founded in 1927, it acquired the business of Stokes & Holt, Leicester. In 1952 it acquired a patent from Brush Traction to build metal-framed bodies. While buses where their core business, they also built bodies for Alvis TC 108G cars in the mid 1950s.

The company was sold to Duple Coachbuilders in September 1958, and then in a management buyout in 1971, it ceased in 1983.
