= Alvis TA 21 =

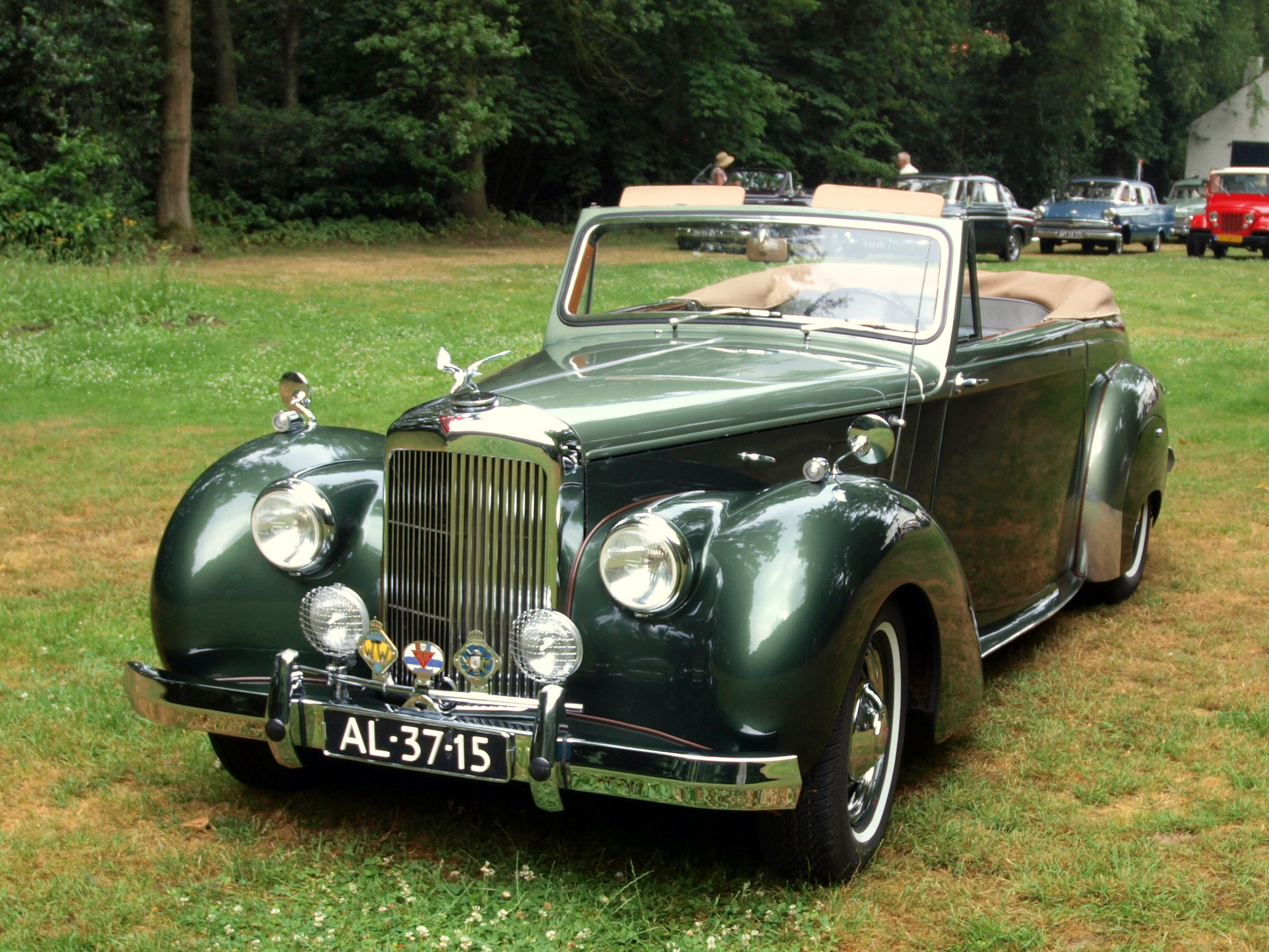
- Three Litre TA 21 drophead coupé by Tickford Limited

Overview
- Manufacturer: Alvis Cars
- Production: 1950–1953; 1316 produced
- Assembly: United Kingdom: Coventry, England

Body and chassis
- Body style: 4-door saloon 2-door drophead coupé
- Layout: FR layout

Powertrain
- Engine: Alvis 3.0 L Straight-6 ohv

Dimensions
- Wheelbase: 111.5 in (2,832 mm)
- Length: 182 in (4,623 mm)
- Width: 66 in (1,676 mm)
- Height: 62.5 in (1,588 mm)

Chronology
- Predecessor: Fourteen
- Successor: Three Litre TC 21

The Alvis Three Litre TA 21, is an luxury car which was produced by Alvis Cars between 1950 and 1953. It was announced at the opening of the Geneva Motor Show 16 March 1950.

Reports noted that the larger new three-litre engine had an equal bore and stroke, (Note: Tax regimes had encouraged long-stroke engines but when the tax system changed manufacturers were able to supply engines with more or less equal (square) bore and stroke which produced a more even flow of torque to the wheels) to provide flexibility in top gear, and the independent front suspension replaced transverse leaf springs with coil springs. Free-standing headlamps became semi-recessed, and rear wheels gained aprons.

== Bodies ==
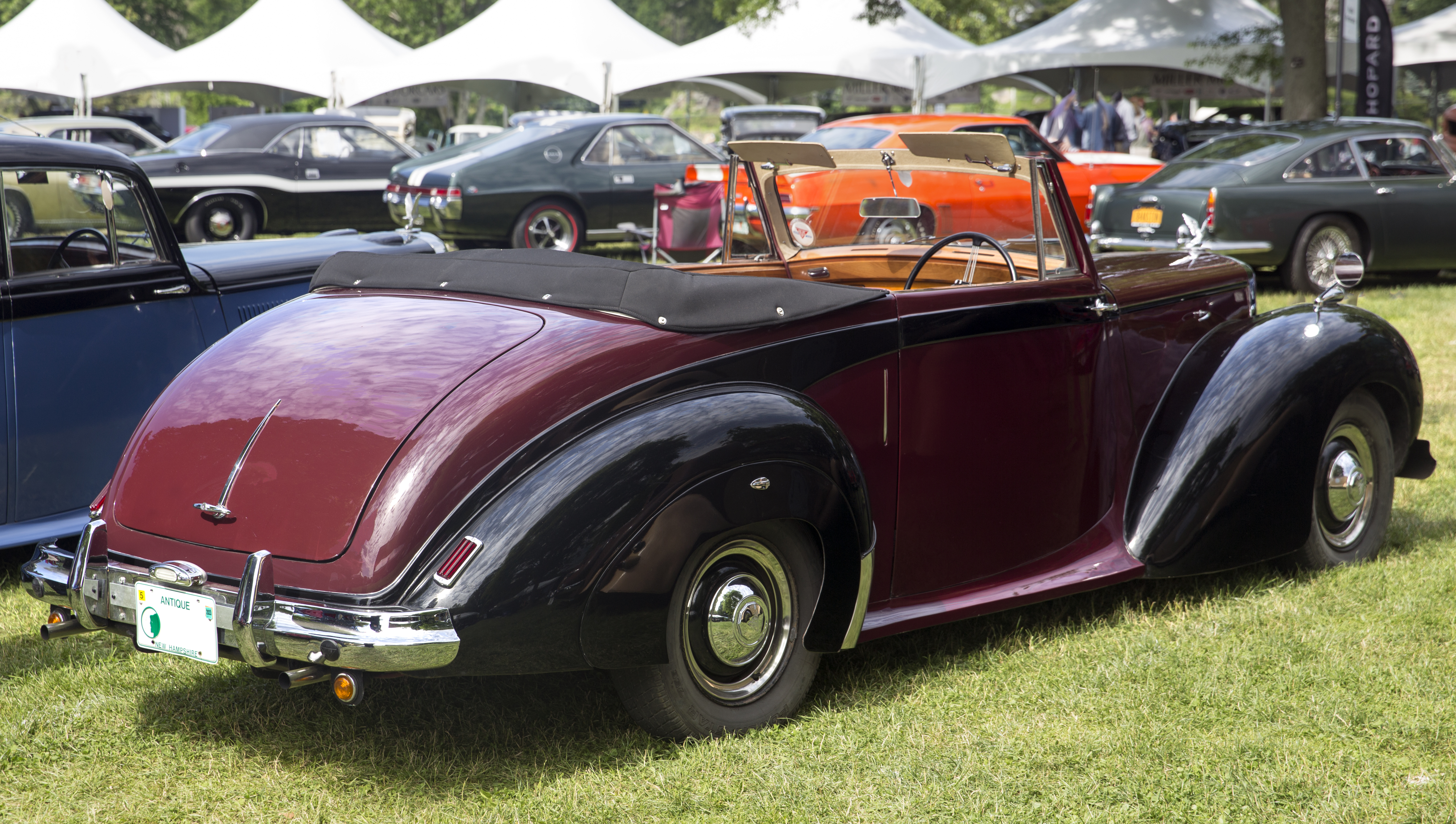
Rear view of the Tickford-bodied drophead coupe

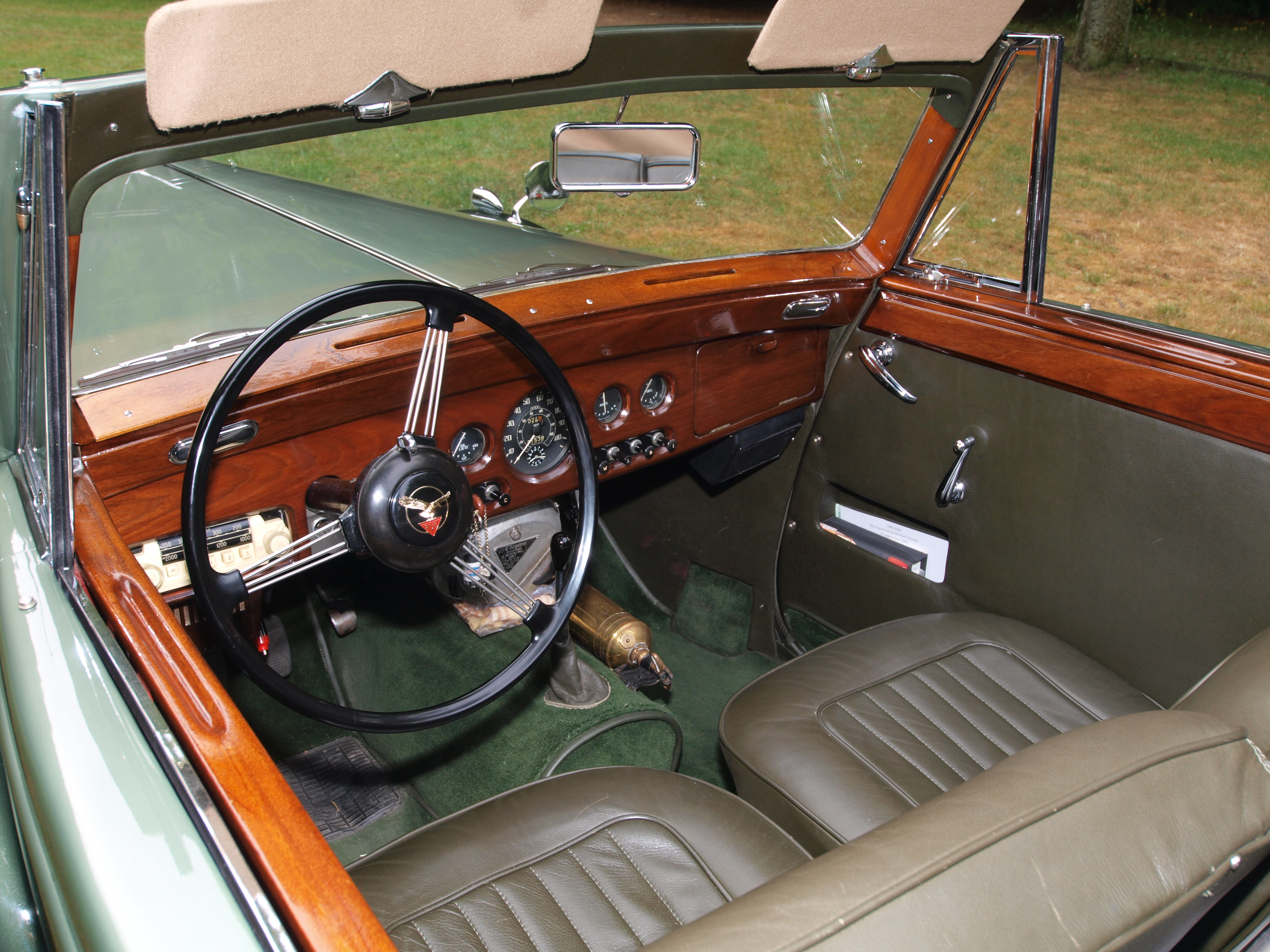
1953 Alvis TA 21 drophead coupe interior

The car was available in a four-door Mulliners-bodied saloon and Tickford drophead coupe. 302 dropheads were made. The centre section of the body was carried over from the earlier TA 14 with minor changes, but the engine and luggage compartments were new and accounted for the extra length. The front doors remained rear hinged, and the wooden dashboard carried over. Seats and interior trim were leather, with separate front and a rear bench fitted with a fold-down centre armrest.

== Engine ==
The 183 cu in (2,993 cc) engine was new and produced 83 bhp (62 kW) fitted with a single Solex carburettor and a compression ratio of 7.0:1. Unusually, the engine incorporated timing gears at the rear of the cylinder block, and a 7-bearing crank to increase smoothness.

This was the first appearance of the engine that would power Alvis cars until the manufacturer withdrew from passenger car production in 1967. Modifications when branded petrol returned to the market in 1953 (and higher octane fuels became available) allowed increasing the compression ratio, and output was progressively raised to 150 bhp (110 kW) in a triple SU carburetter version in 1965.

== Chassis ==
The suspension was independent at the front, using coil springs, with leaf springs fitted at the rear. Hydraulic 11 in (279 mm) drum brakes using a Lockheed system were used, a first for Alvis.

== Test ==
A saloon version tested by The Motor magazine in 1952 had a top speed of 88.7 mph (142.7 km/h) and could accelerate from 0-60 mph (97 km/h) in 15.5 seconds. A fuel consumption of 19.5 miles per imperial gallon (14.5 L/100 km; 16.2 mpg_{‑US}) was recorded. The test car cost £1945 including taxes.

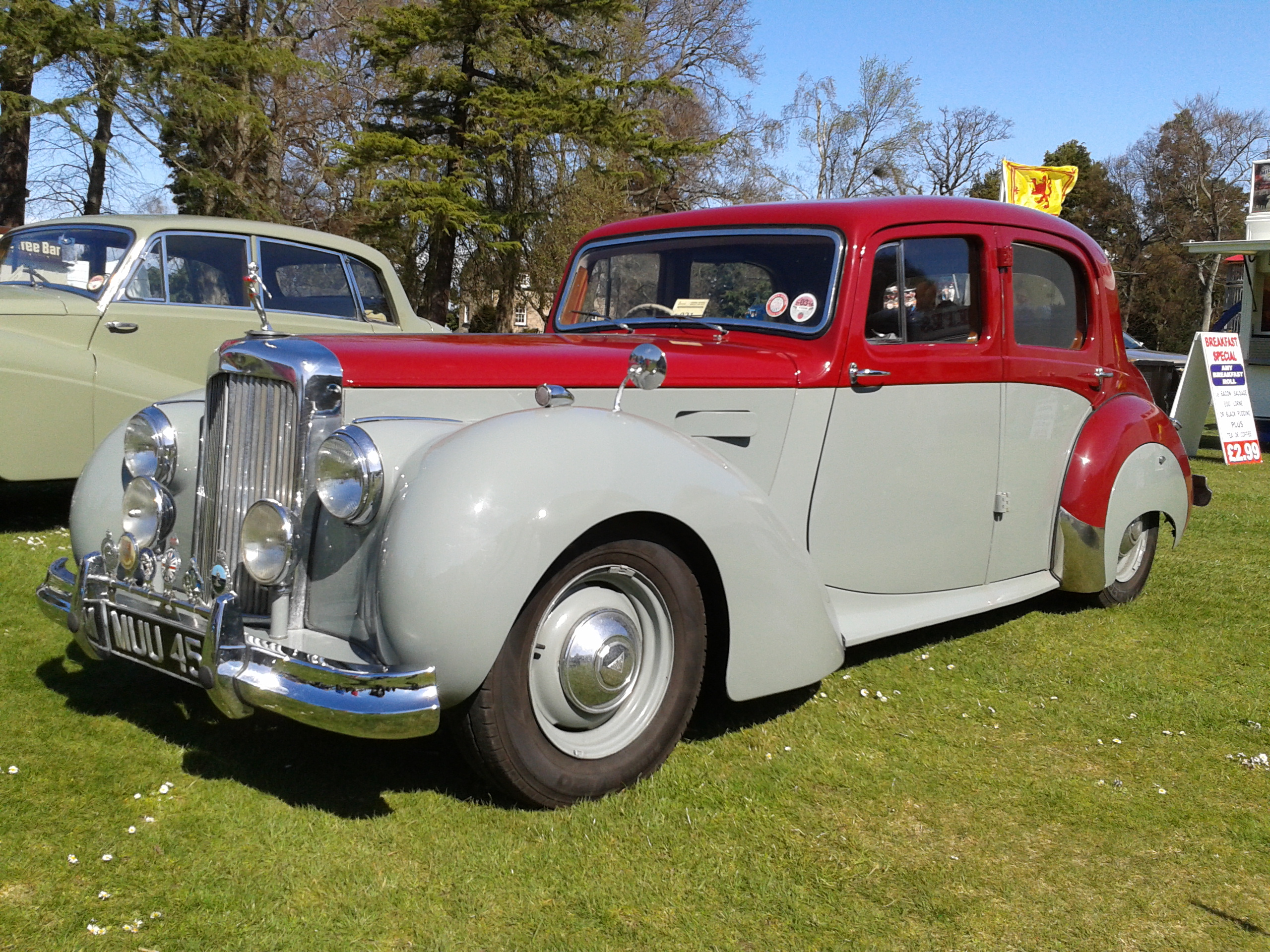
Three Litre TA 21 4-door saloon
