= Alvis TC 21 =

Alvis Three Litre TC 21
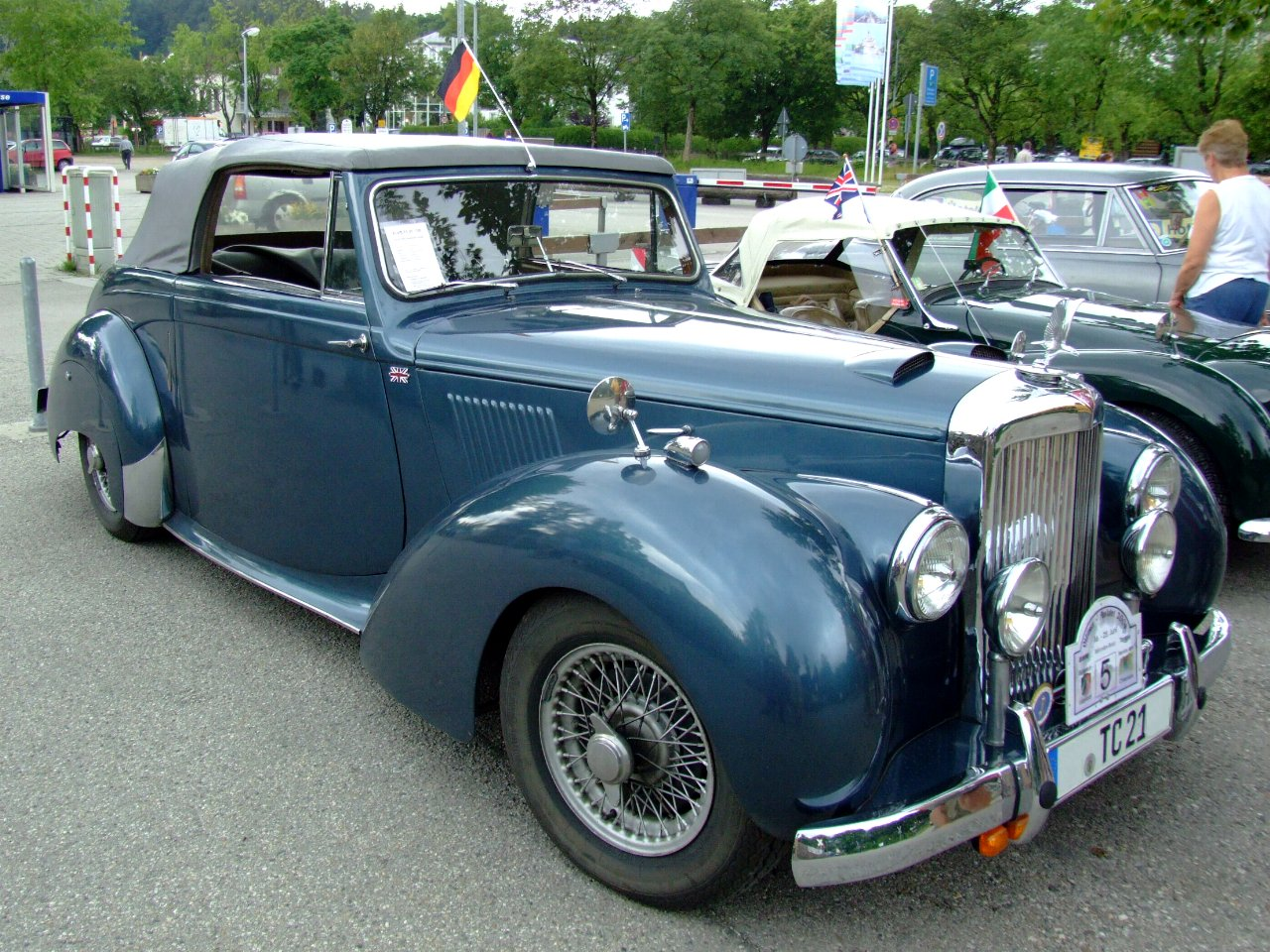
- TC 21 100 Grey Lady drophead coupé

Overview
- Manufacturer: Alvis Cars
- Production: 1953–1955; 757 produced
- Assembly: United Kingdom: Coventry, England

Body and chassis
- Body style: 4-door saloon 2-door drophead coupé
- Layout: FR layout

Powertrain
- Engine: 3.0 L I6
- Transmission: 4-speed manual

Dimensions
- Wheelbase: 111.5 in (2,832 mm)
- Length: 182 in (4,623 mm)
- Width: 66 in (1,676 mm)
- Height: 62.5 in (1,588 mm)

Chronology
- Predecessor: Three Litre TA 21
- Successor: Alvis TC 108G

The Alvis Three Litre, also known as TC 21, is a luxury car produced by British manufacturer Alvis between 1953 and 1955. An updated version of the Three Litre TA 21, it was available as a 4-door saloon and, in its later TC 21/100 form, also as a 2-door drophead coupé.

== TC 21 ==
=== Body ===
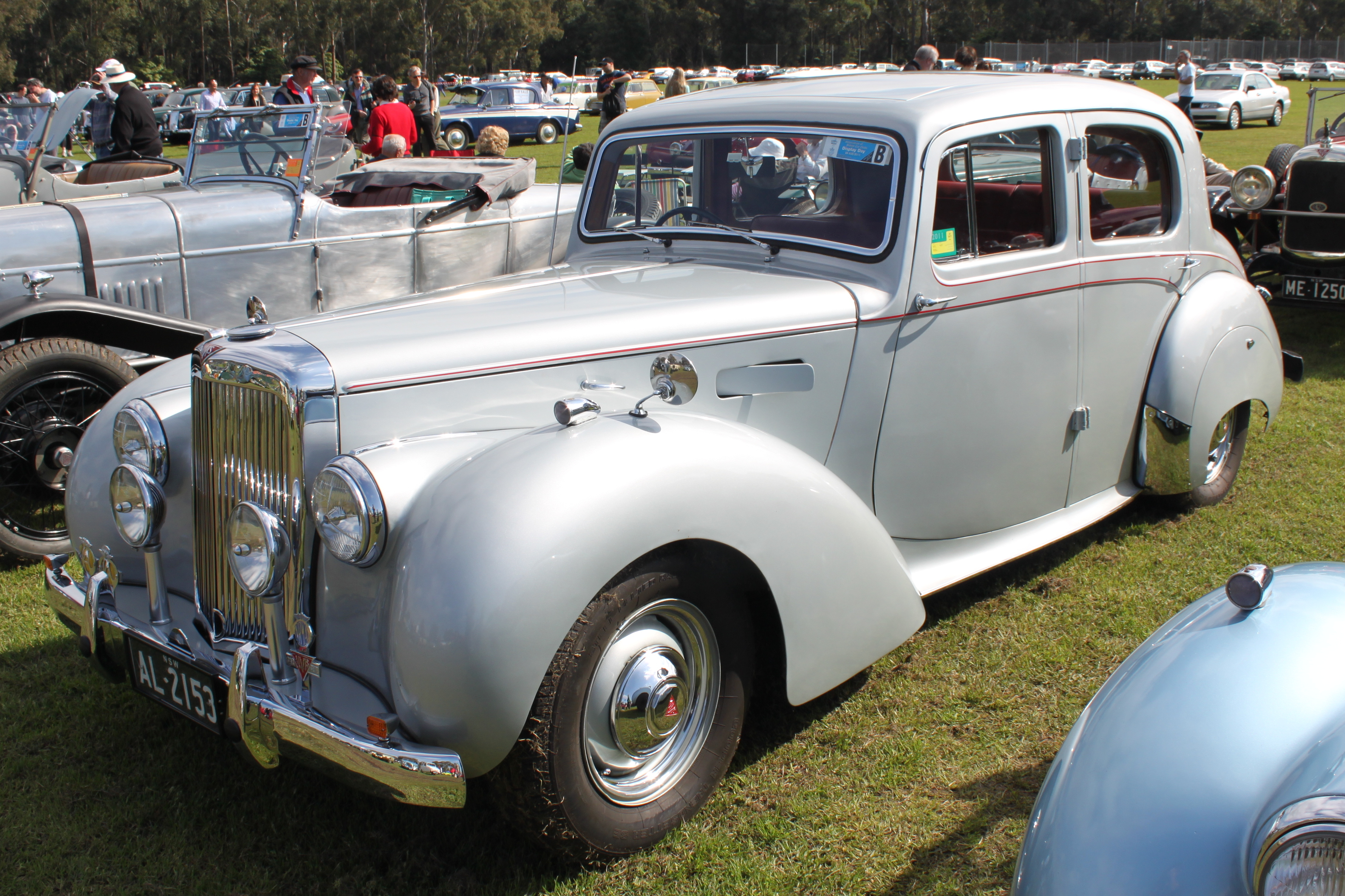
Alvis TC 21 Saloon

The TC 21 was available as four-door saloon but, unlike its TA 21 predecessor, no drophead version was offered. The bodies were again made for Alvis by Mulliners in Birmingham. A sunshine roof remained standard, as did "separately adjustable front seats; heater and air-conditioning unit; Trico windscreen washers" drawing the comment from Autocar "In detail fittings . . . this car leaves little to be desired".

Later TC 21s have chromium-plated window frames.

=== Engine ===
The 2,993 cc engine was upgraded to produce 100 bhp (75 kW) by modifying the cylinder head and fitting twin SU carburettors. Suspension was the same as the TA 21, independent at the front using coil springs with leaf springs at the rear. The 11 in (279 mm) drum brakes using a Lockheed system were also retained.

However this update found few buyers during a very difficult year for the British Motor Industry and though it remained in the catalogue and continued to be advertised it was in practice replaced by the TC.21/100 Grey Lady.

== TC.21/100 Grey Lady ==
The TC.21/100 or Grey Lady announced 20 October 1953 came with a guaranteed 100 mph (160 km/h) top speed, resulting from an improved exhaust system and an engine compression ratio raised from 7:1 to 8:1 to take advantage of newly restored availability of higher octane petrol. The final drive ratio was raised from 4.09:1 to 3.77:1. A paired front fog lamp and matching driving lamp became a standard fitting. The bonnet gained air scoops and wire wheels were fitted as standard equipment to try to enliven the car's image. A heater came standard, but a radio remained an expensive option.

Four door saloon and drophead coupé versions were offered.

A saloon version tested by The Motor magazine in 1954 had a top speed of 100.1 mph (161.1 km/h) and could accelerate from 0-60 mph (97 km/h) in 15.4 seconds. A fuel consumption of 20.6 miles per imperial gallon (13.7 L/100 km; 17.2 mpg_{‑US}) was recorded. The test car cost £1,821 including taxes.

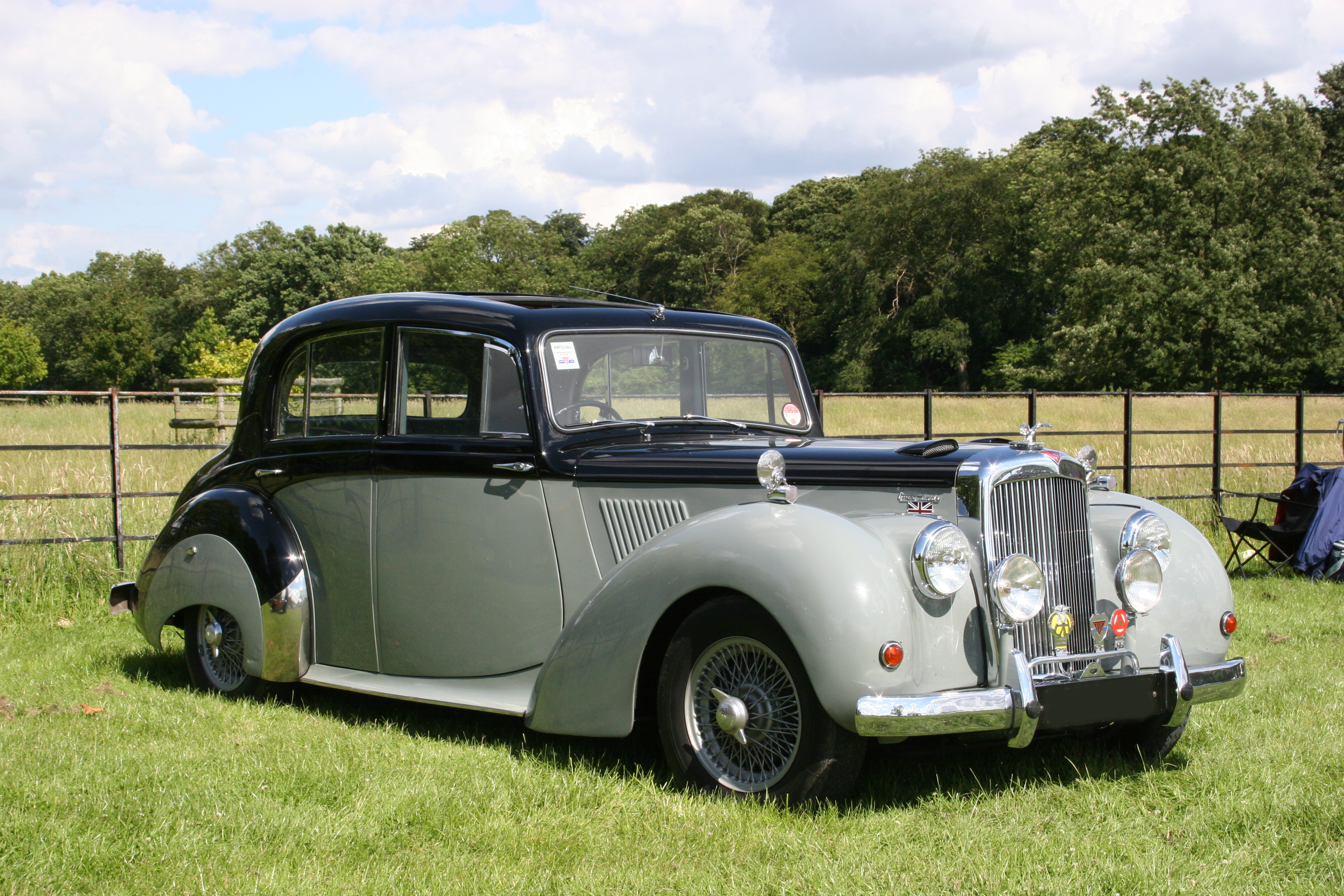
Alvis TC 21/100 Grey Lady Saloon, manufactured in 1953

=== Styling ===
In July 1955 the Times' Motoring Correspondent tested and reported on the Grey Lady under the headline "Few Concessions to Fashion Trends". He observed that this Alvis had become one of the few British cars that did not look American, adding that there was little concession to the cult of streamlining beyond the two air scoops in the bonnet. He wrote that spacious internal headroom and wire wheels completed that picture. It was noted the centre mounted instruments left the speedometer apt to be masked by the driver's left hand, but the front seats were comfortable and rear seat passengers received padding on the wheel arches surmounted by armrests. Leather upholstery, pile carpets and walnut facings for the dashboard and lower parts of the window frames completed the traditional picture. He was enthusiastic about the car's performance, saying that "the driver who is sensitive to the "feel" of his car will enjoy every moment of his motoring irrespective of the traffic", and reported that while the car's behaviour on corners was extremely stable though potholes like those caused by recessed manhole covers, the bumps proved very heavy going for the springing.

A Graber-bodied coupe on a TC 21/100 chassis was exhibited at the London Motor Show in October 1955. The similar TC 108G entered limited production the following year.
