= Carrosserie Hermann Graber =

Swiss coachbuilder

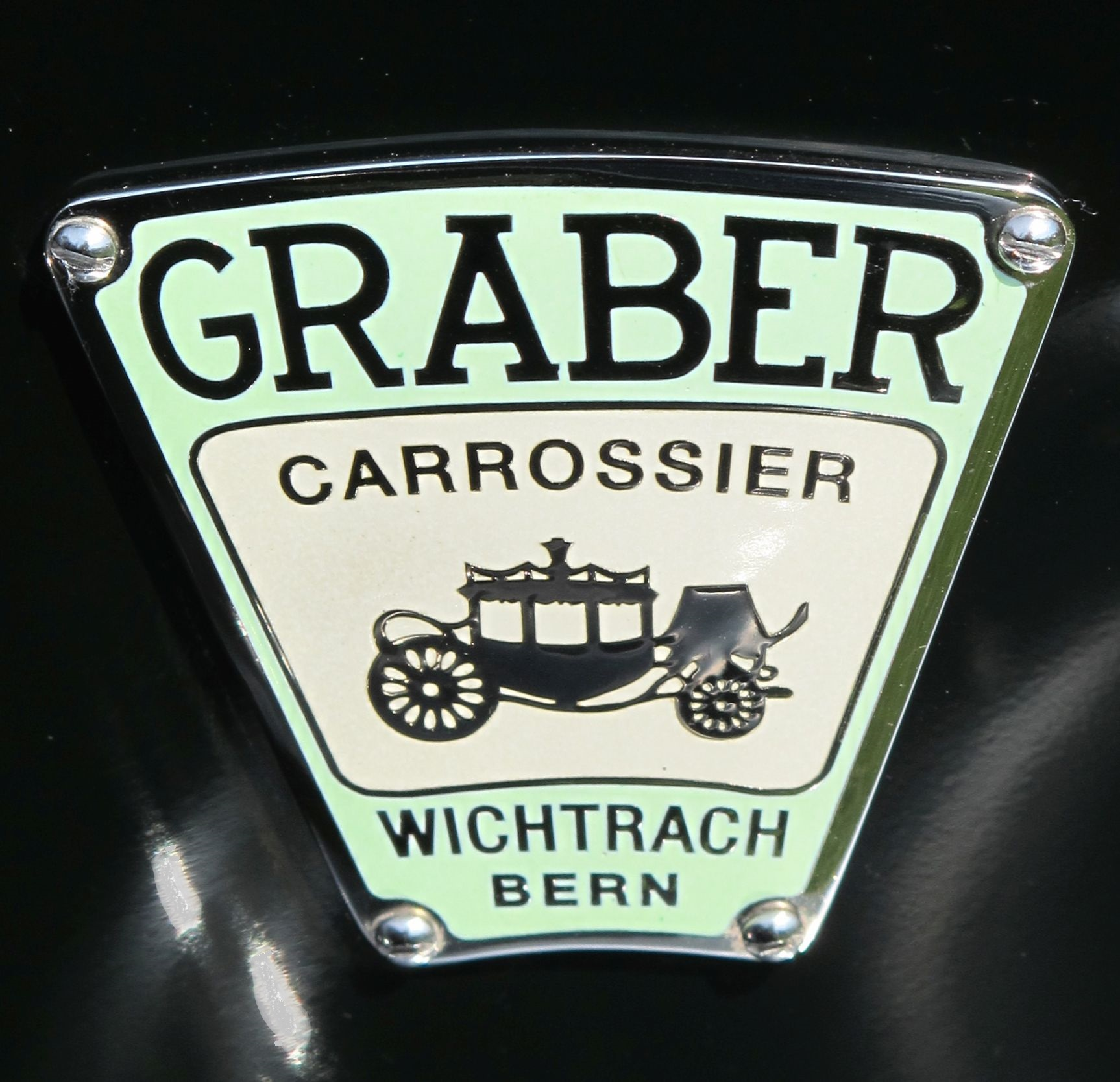

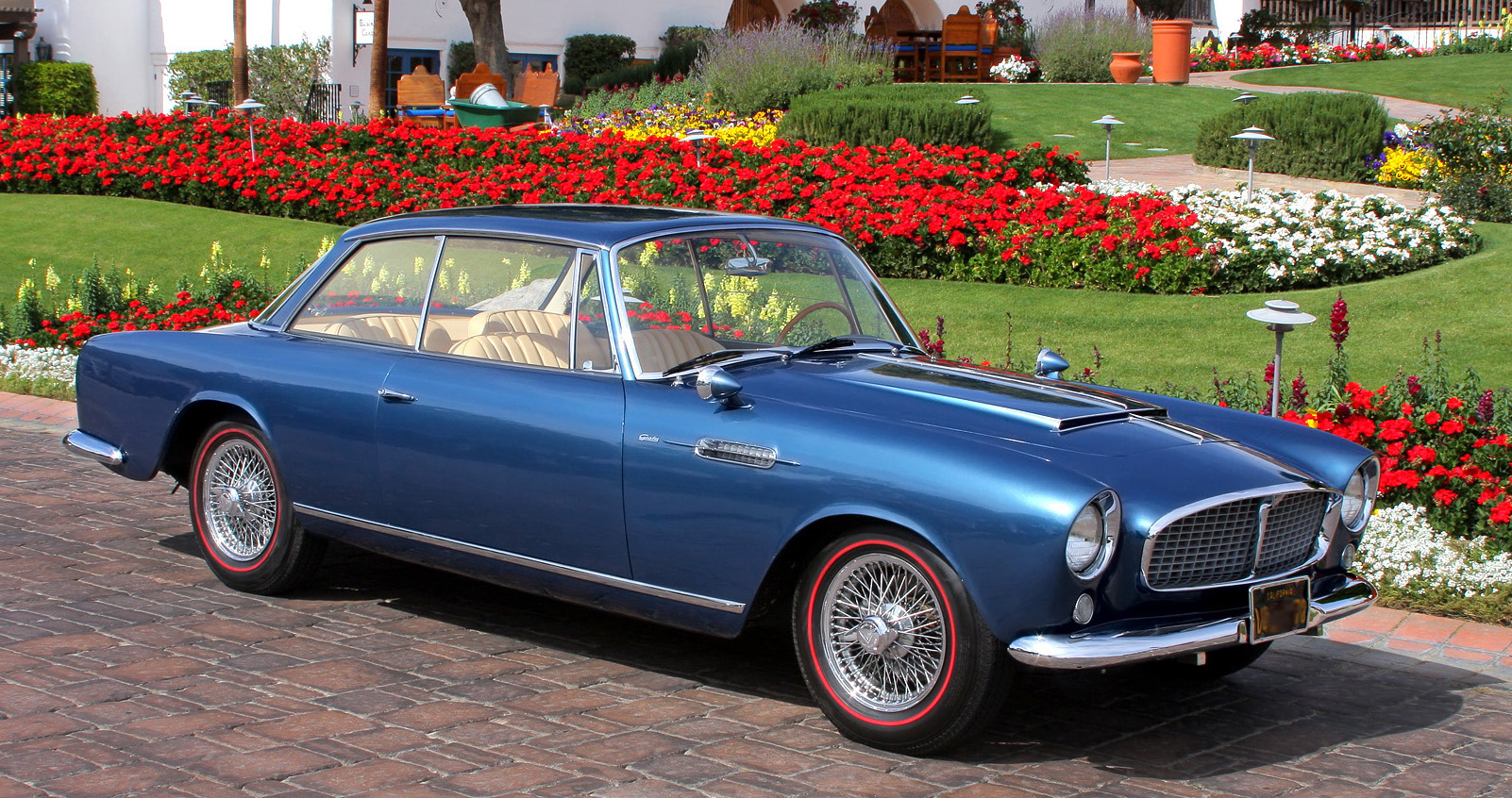
1967 Graber Alvis (front)

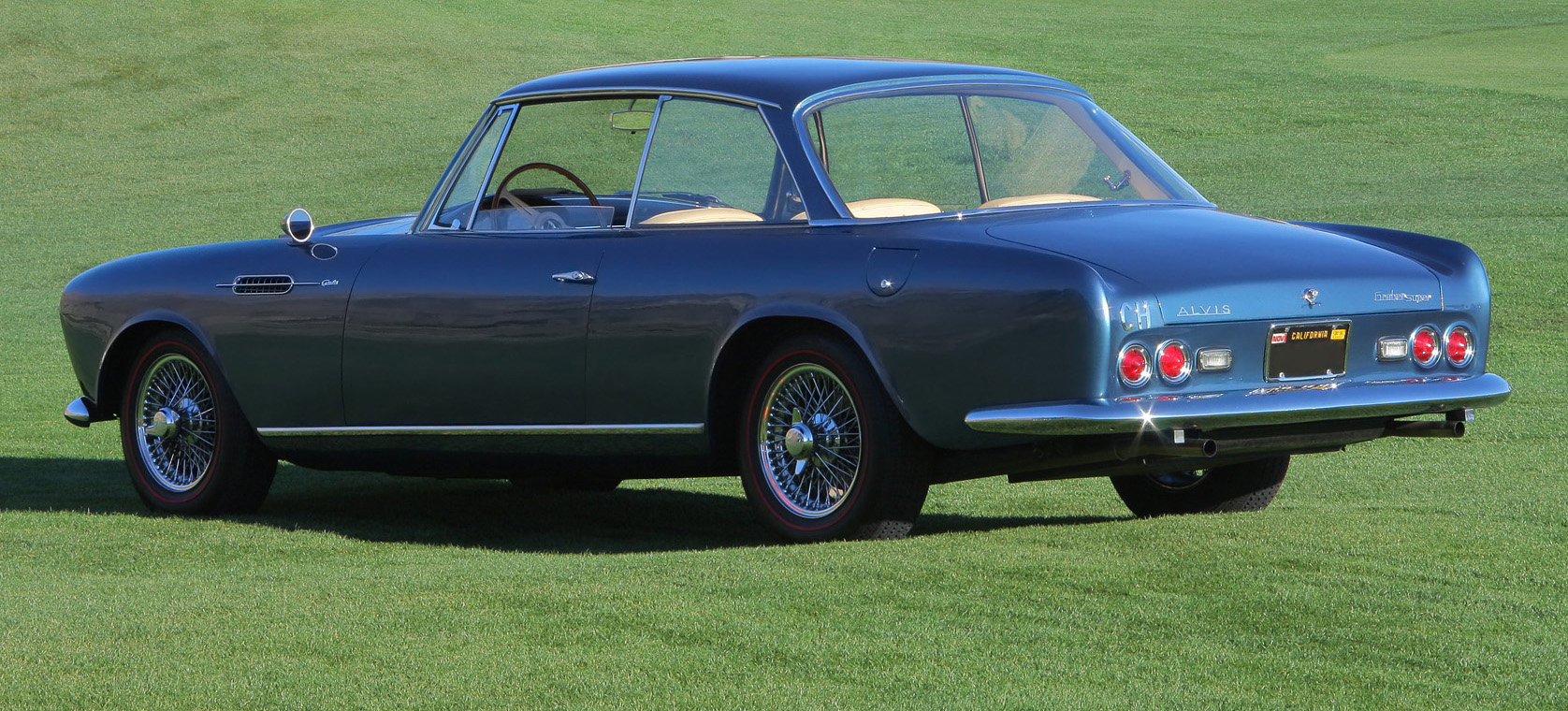
1967 Graber Alvis (rear)

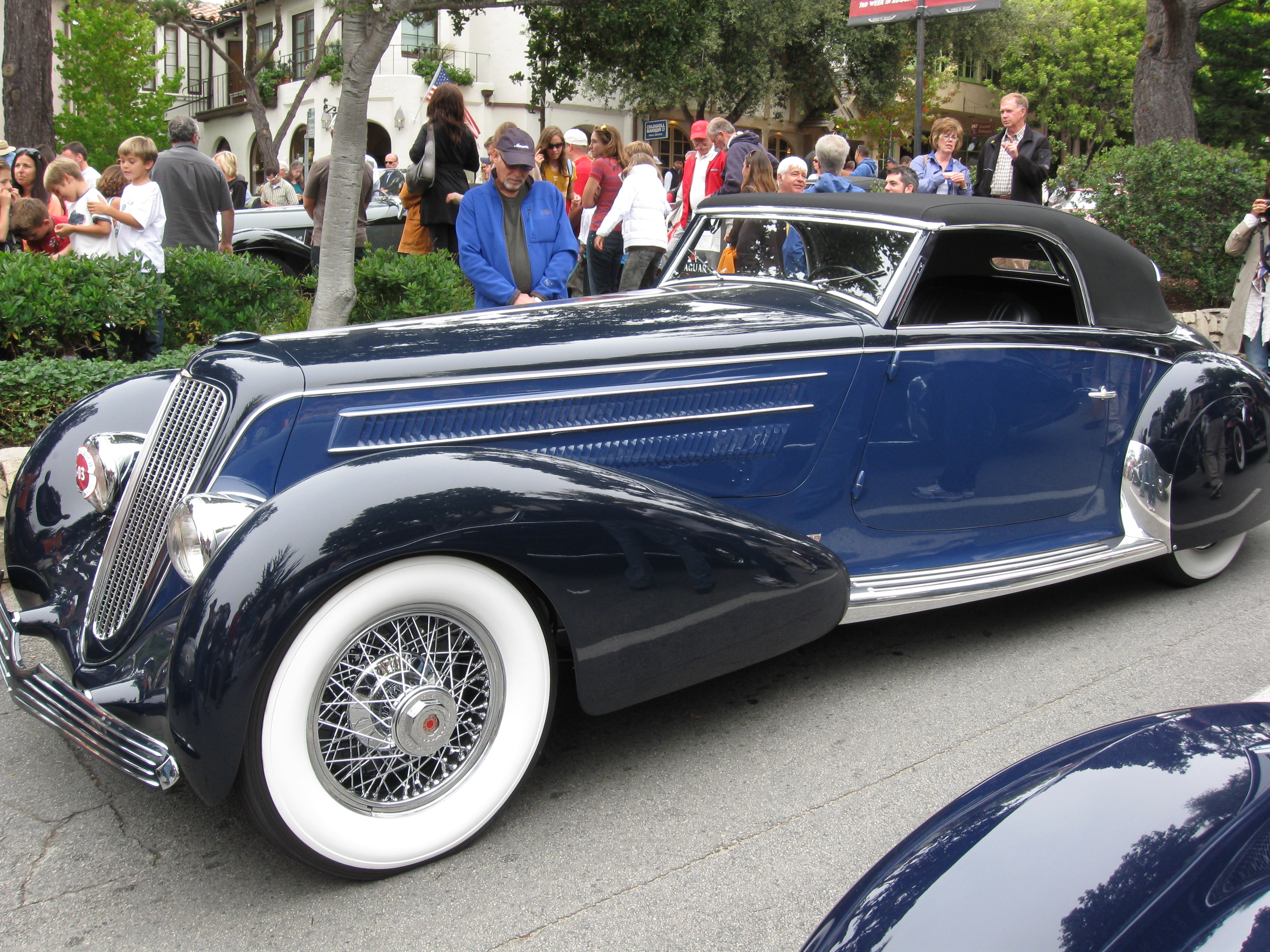
A Duesenberg Model J cabriolet with a custom body by Graber

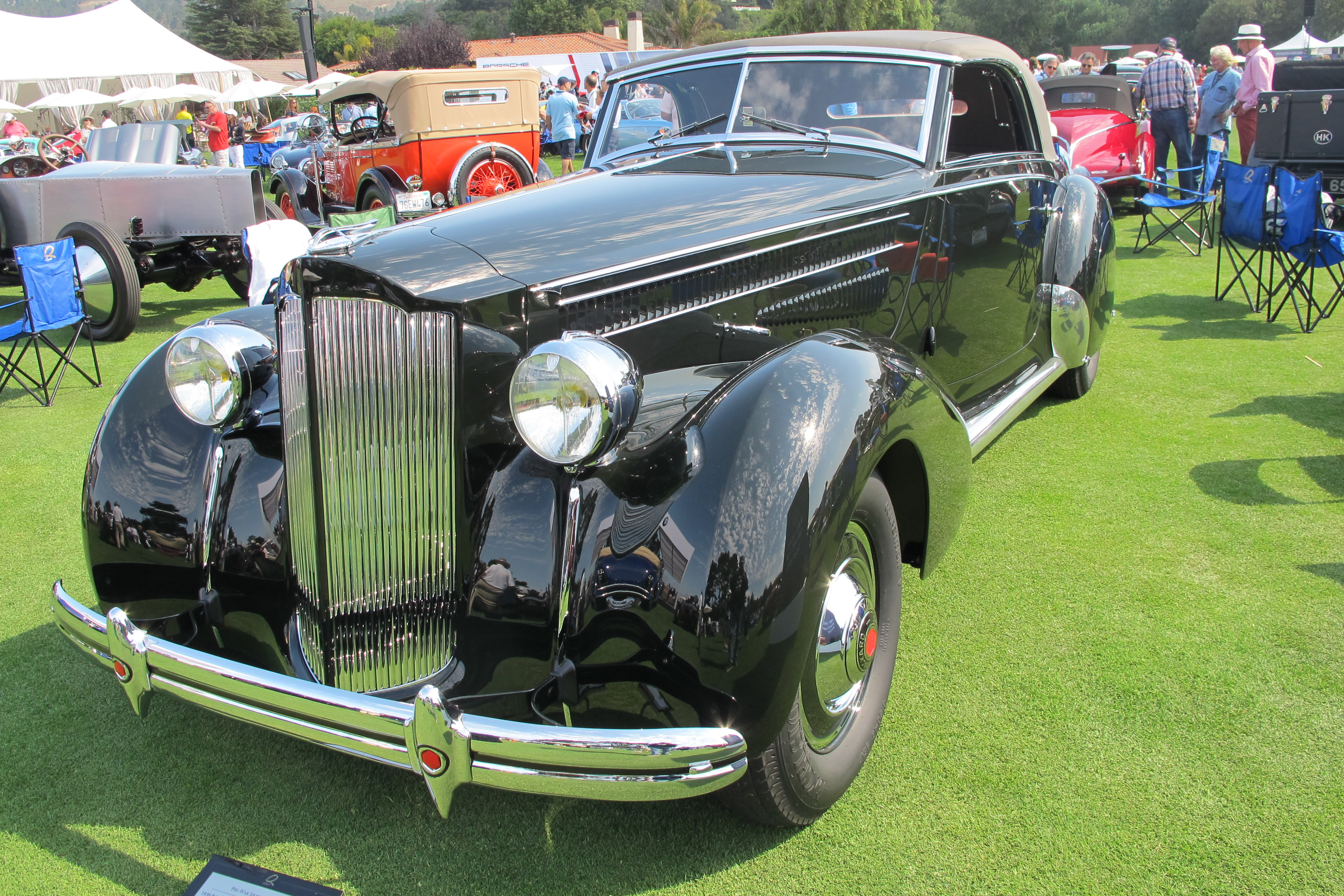
1938 Packard with custom coachwork by Graber

Carrosserie Hermann Graber, simply known as Graber was a Swiss coachbuilder based in Wichtrach (canton of Bern). Between 1927 and 1970 the firm supplied coach-built bodies for fitting on the chassis of various European and US auto-makers. Graber had a particularly close relationship with the British firm of Alvis, providing the manufacturer with bespoke and elegant if expensive bodies for almost twenty years, mostly during the 1950s and 1960s.

== History ==
The history of the business goes back to 1924 which was when Hermann Graber, then aged 21, took over his father's wheel making business and quickly reconfigured it for the production of car bodies.

The company's first car, a two-seater cabriolet bodied Fiat 509 was presented in 1927. Two years later a Graber bodied Panhard & Levassor 20 CV won the Concours d'Elegance at St. Moritz as a result of which the "Carrosserie Graber" business became known across Europe. During the 1930s the company built a number of special bodies on a range of chassis from Alfa Romeo, Bentley, Bugatti, Duesenberg and Packard.

In the early 1930s France had lost to Britain its position as Europe's largest automobile producer, and Britain would retain the top slot until the early 1950s so it made sense for Graber, after the war, to concentrate on special car bodies designed to complement some of the more exclusive chassis produced by the UK auto-industry, which they did, especially in respect of Alvis and Bentley, Aston Martin, Lagonda, Rolls-Royce and Rover as makers of cars with separate chassis

In 1946 Graber made his first Alvis body and by 1953 acquired the Swiss distribution rights for Alvis Cars. In 1955, in response to a customer order from Alvis, they produced what would turn out to be the first two of several Graber bodied prototypes on an Alvis chassis.

During the 1950s links between Graber and Alvis became close. After the long-time Alvis designer G.T. Smith-Clarke left the company, Graber presented in 1955 his Graber bodied Alvis TC 21/100 "Grey Lady" which somehow combined classical elegance with a thoroughly modern pontoon format body. The new Alvis bodies went into series production, under licence by the British firms firstly with Willowbrook and later Park Ward. Park Ward took the Swiss drawings and adapted them to produce a car with more interior space than the Graber original. All the subsequent Alvis TD TE and the very last TF21 followed Graber's basic blueprint. Meanwhile, in central Switzerland Graber continued to build to order special bodied cars based on Alvis chassis at a rate of not more than ten per year. These included four seater coupe bodied cars (sometimes described by the English as saloons), cabriolets, and four four-door specials. Graber's bodies were lower than the standard bodied Alvis cars with more steeply raked A and C pillars. When customers requested improvements, Graber was happy not merely to produce special bodies but also to redesign or adapt aspects of the chassis and running gear.

Hermann Graber died in 1970 and the production of special bodied cars at Wichtrach came to an end. About 800 Graber bodied vehicles had by now been produced. The business continued to operate under the control of his widow, specialising now in the repair and maintenance of car bodies. Between 1980 and 1996 the Graber business held a franchise as an official Ferrari importer. In 2001 the residuum of the business was acquired by a well-known Swiss classic car restorer named Markus Scharnhorst, and relocated to Toffen.

== Sources and further reading ==
- Emil Bohnenblust: Hermann Graber war der ungekrönte König der Schweizer Karosseriebauer. In: DrachePost Nr. 4, Juni 2005, S. 12 f.
- Kevin Brazendale: Enzyklopädie Automobil von Alfa Romeo bis Zagato. Die 600 schönsten Modelle. Weltbild, Augsburg 2000. ISBN 3-8289-5384-0.
- Dieter Günther: Swiss Connection. Modellgeschichte der Alvis TC21 bis TF21 in: Oldtimer Markt, Sonderheft 14 – Luxus, Leistrung und vier Sitze. Gran Tourismo: Die großen Reisecoupés
- Rainer W. Schlegelmich, Hartmut Lehbrink: Englische Sportwagen. Köln (Könemann) 2001, ISBN 3-8290-7449-2.
- Halwart Schrader, David Lillywhite: Klassische Automobile. Stuttgart (Motorbuch Verlag) 2005. ISBN 3-613-02552-3.
