= Park Ward =

British coachbuilder founded in 1919

Coordinates: 51.5290117°N 0.2400825°W

- Industry: Coachbuilder
- Founded: 1919; 107 years ago
- Founders: William MacDonald Park; Charles Ward
- Defunct: 1961
- Fate: Bought by Rolls-Royce (1939); merged with Mulliner (1961)
- Successor: Mulliner Park Ward
- Headquarters: London, United Kingdom
- Products: Motorcar bodies

Park Ward was a British coachbuilder founded in 1919 which operated from Willesden in North London. In the 1930s, backed by Rolls-Royce Limited, it made technical advances which enabled the building of all-steel bodies to Rolls-Royce's high standards. Bought by Rolls-Royce in 1939, it merged with H. J. Mulliner & Co. in 1961 to form Mulliner Park Ward.

== History ==
Park Ward was founded in 1919 by William MacDonald Park and Charles Ward; they had worked together at F.W. Berwick Limited, the makers of Sizaire-Berwick cars. They built their first Rolls-Royce body in 1920. After producing bodies for a variety of cars in the early 1920s, Park Ward became particularly associated with W O Bentley's new business, manufacturing their chassis nearby at Cricklewood.

In 1922, they were asked by Rolls-Royce to take part in a scheme to make standard bodies for their small Twenty model, but the project was abandoned, although they did build bespoke bodies for Rolls-Royce customers exhibiting a 40-50 model at the British Empire Exhibition in 1924. From the mid-1920s, the company started to concentrate on Bentley and Rolls-Royce models. By 1930, 90% of all of Park Ward's efforts were for Rolls-Royce.

After the Rolls-Royce take-over of Bentley in 1931, Rolls-Royce took a stake in Park Ward. Beginning in 1933, when they obtained patents, Park Ward developed a technically interesting all-steel saloon in conjunction with Rolls-Royce, and from 1936 offered it on the 4¼-litre Bentley chassis. These bodies were supported by Silentbloc rubber bushes to reduce road-shock engine-noise and vibration. The cars were produced in small batches, giving quite noticeable economies in manufacture, with a consequent reduction in selling price.

By 1937, as many as ten cars a week were passing through Park Ward's works, and in 1939, Rolls-Royce completed its acquisition of the business. After World War II, Park Ward continued to produce special coachwork, and the all-steel technology was used by Rolls-Royce to produce a standard body range on its cars, starting with the Bentley Mark VI. During the last half of the 1950s, Rolls-Royce switched to manufactured steel bodies for their Silver Cloud model, reducing their volume of coach built models. The manufacturing capacity thus released was used for manufacturing Alvis TD21 vehicles.

In 1961, Park Ward was merged with H. J. Mulliner & Co. to form Mulliner Park Ward. Mulliner Park Ward operations were centralised in the former Park Ward factory in Willesden. In 1971, the division was retitled Rolls-Royce Motors Ltd.

== Bugatti Royale coachwork ==
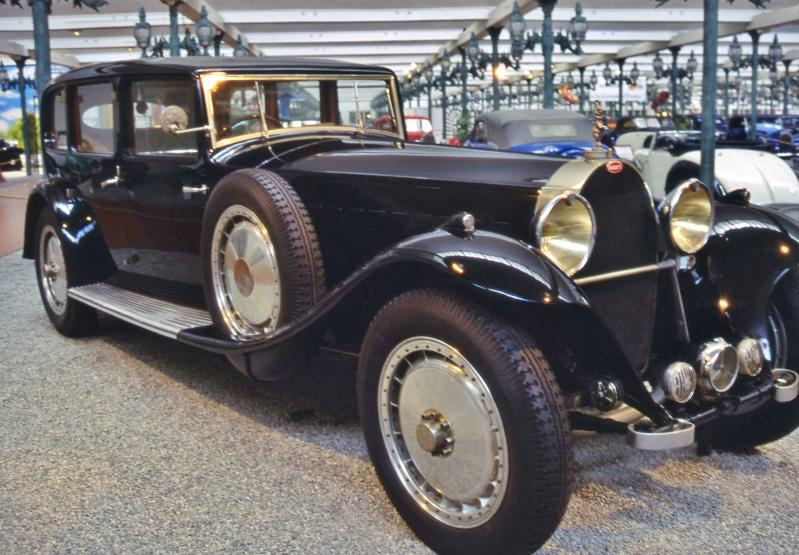
Captain Foster's Bugatti Royale

Captain Cuthbert W. Foster, heir to the Bird's Custard fortune, commissioned Park Ward to build a body onto his newly acquired Bugatti Royale, the fourth one built (chassis number 41-131). Fashioned on a favorite Rolls-Royce he had previously owned, the car is known as the Foster car or Limousine Park-Ward.

After being acquired in 1963 by Fritz Schlumpf from American Bugatti collector John Shakespeare, the car now resides at the Musée National de l'Automobile de Mulhouse in France, alongside Ettore Bugatti's personal Royale, the Coupé Napoleon.

== Gallery ==
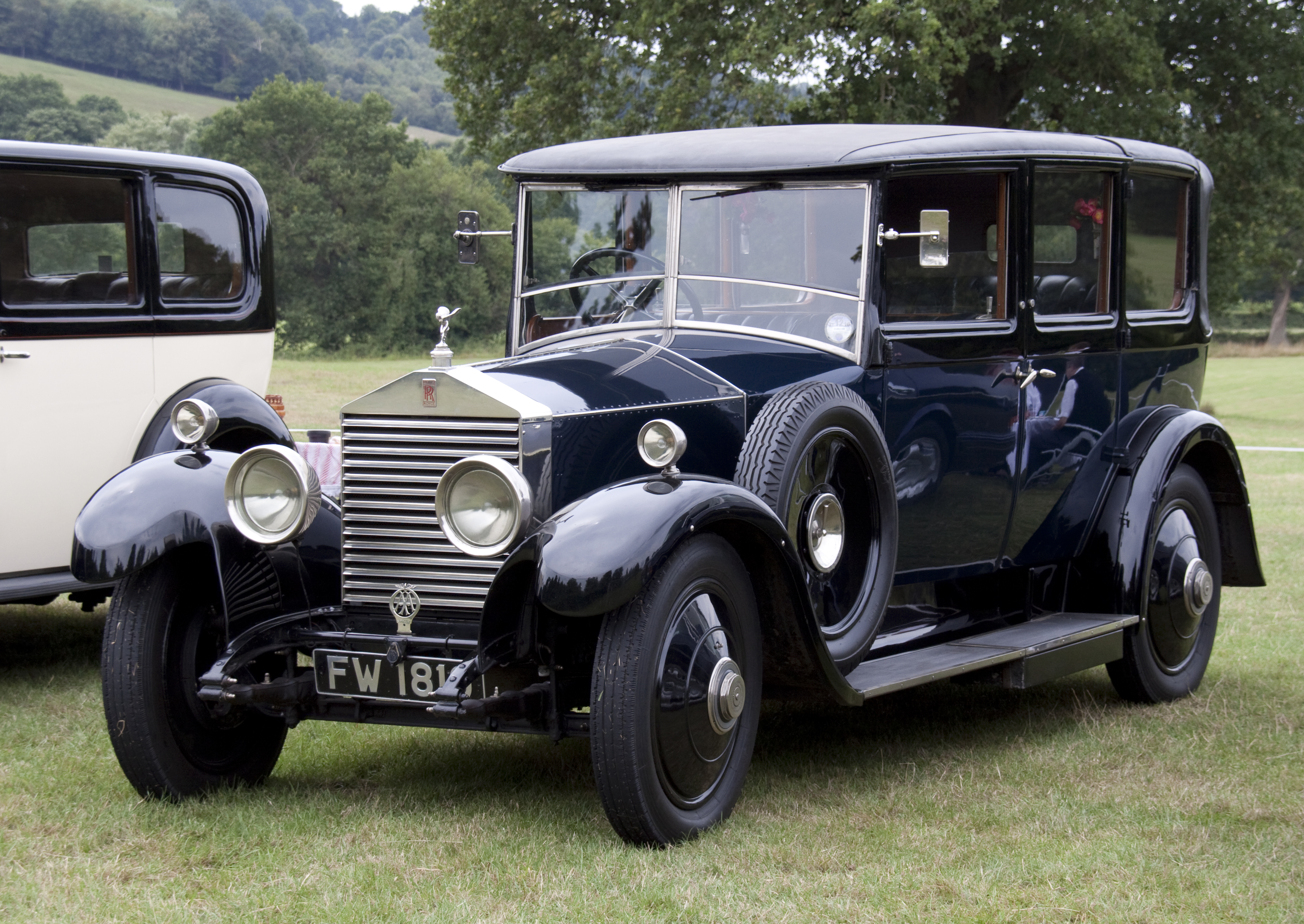
1928 Rolls-Royce Twenty landaulette

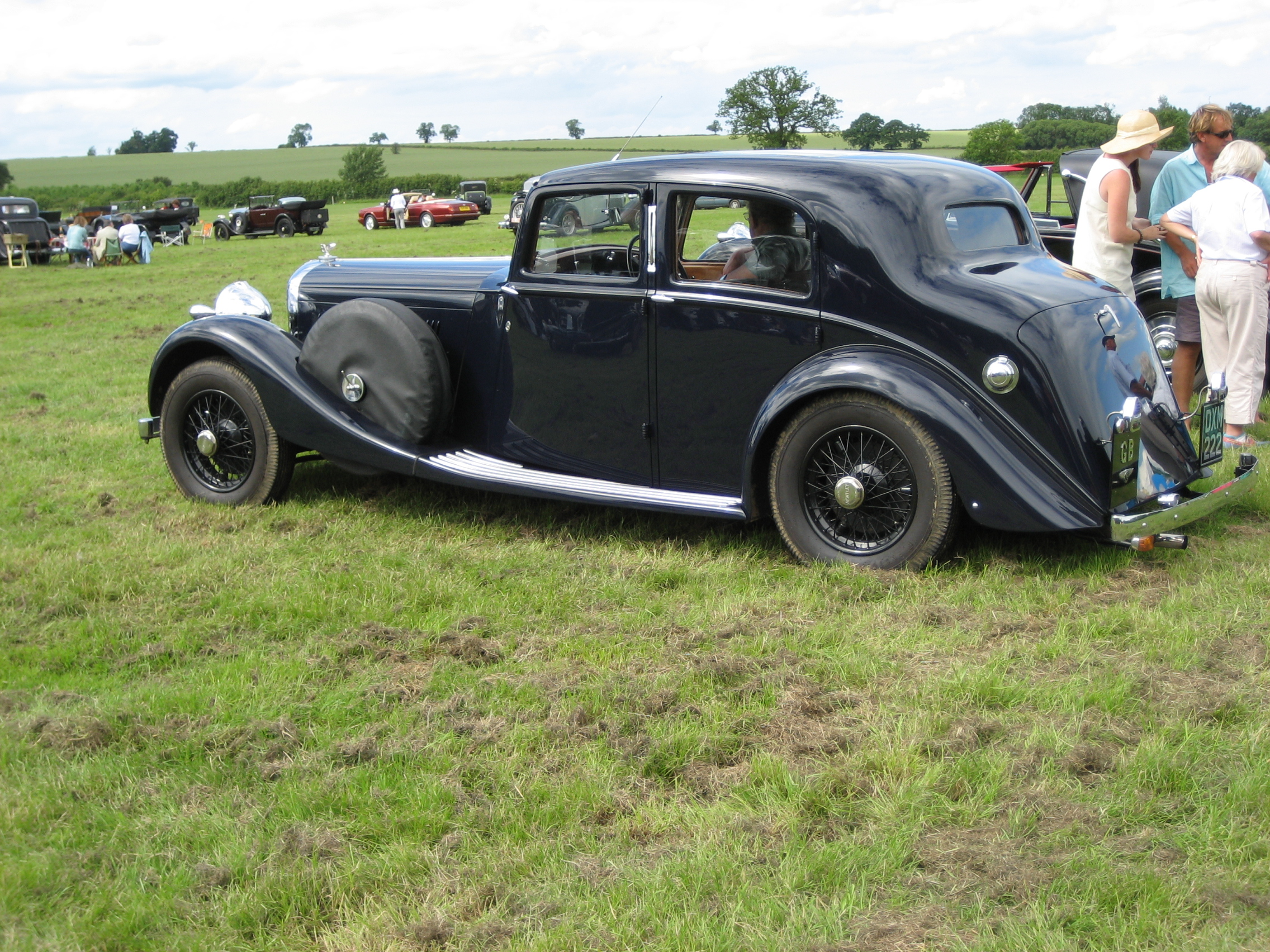
1937 4¼-litre Bentley sports saloon

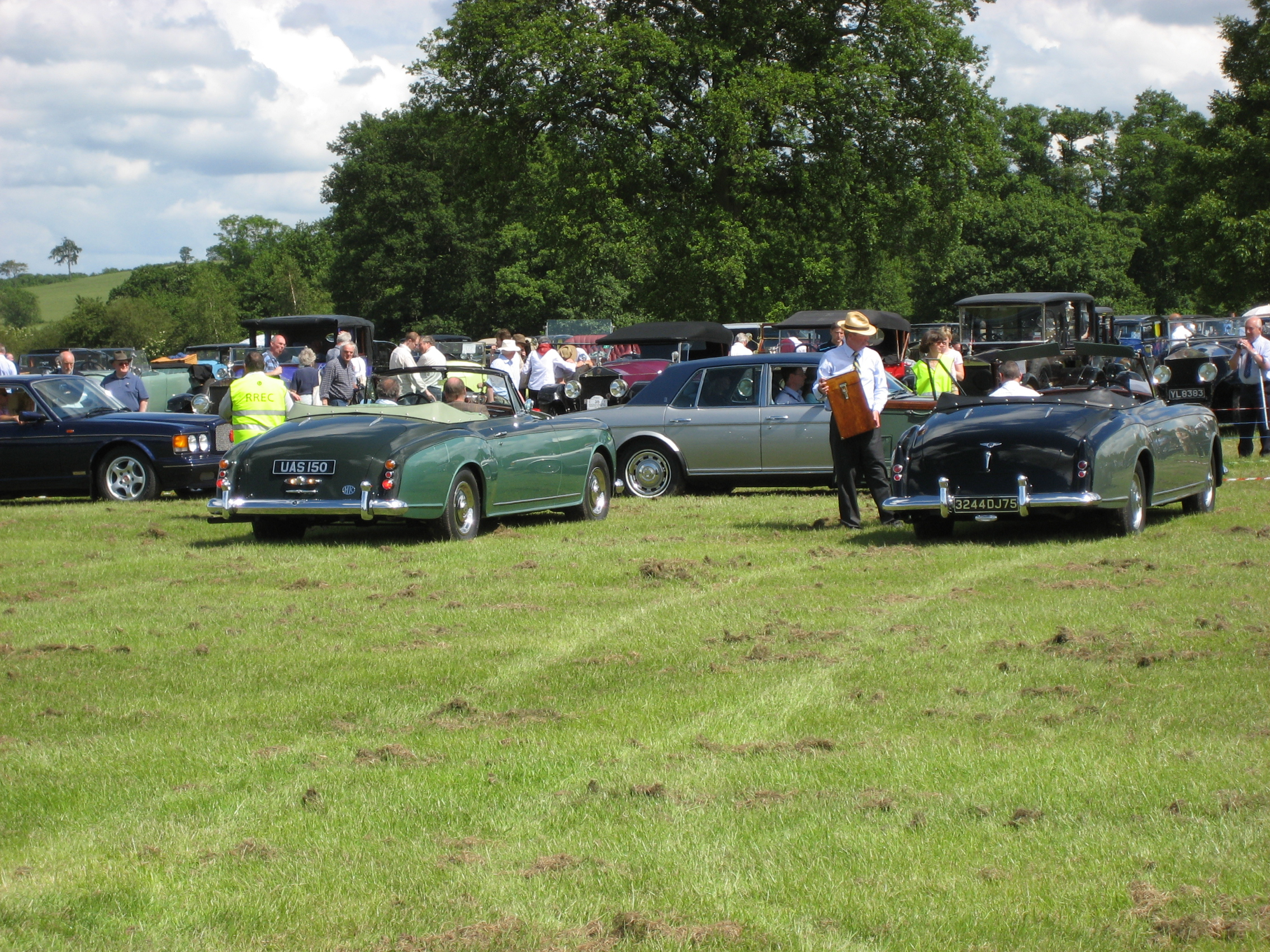
1956 and 1954 Bentley Continental drophead coupés

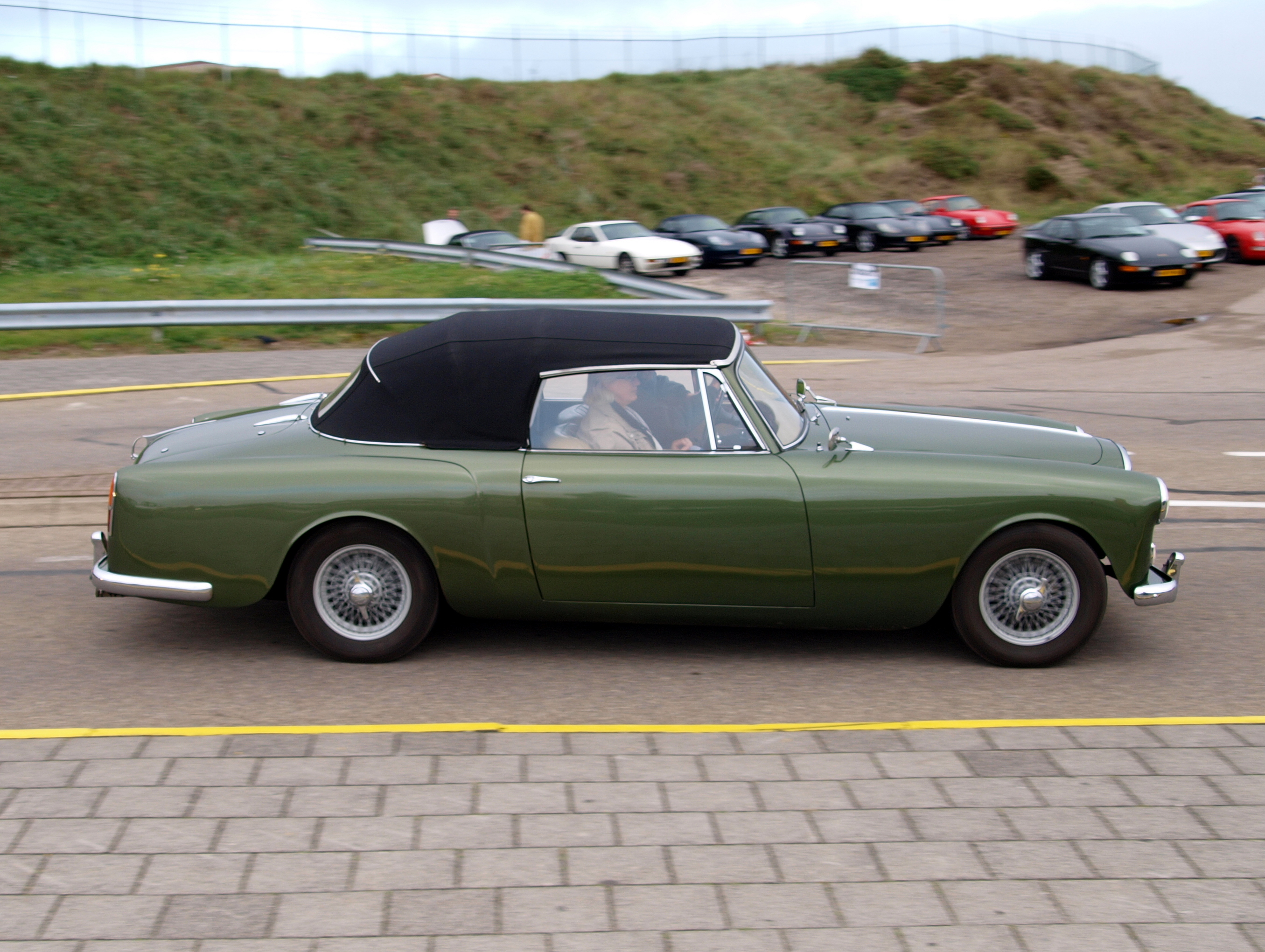
1960 Alvis TD21 drophead coupé
