= Alvis 12/70 =

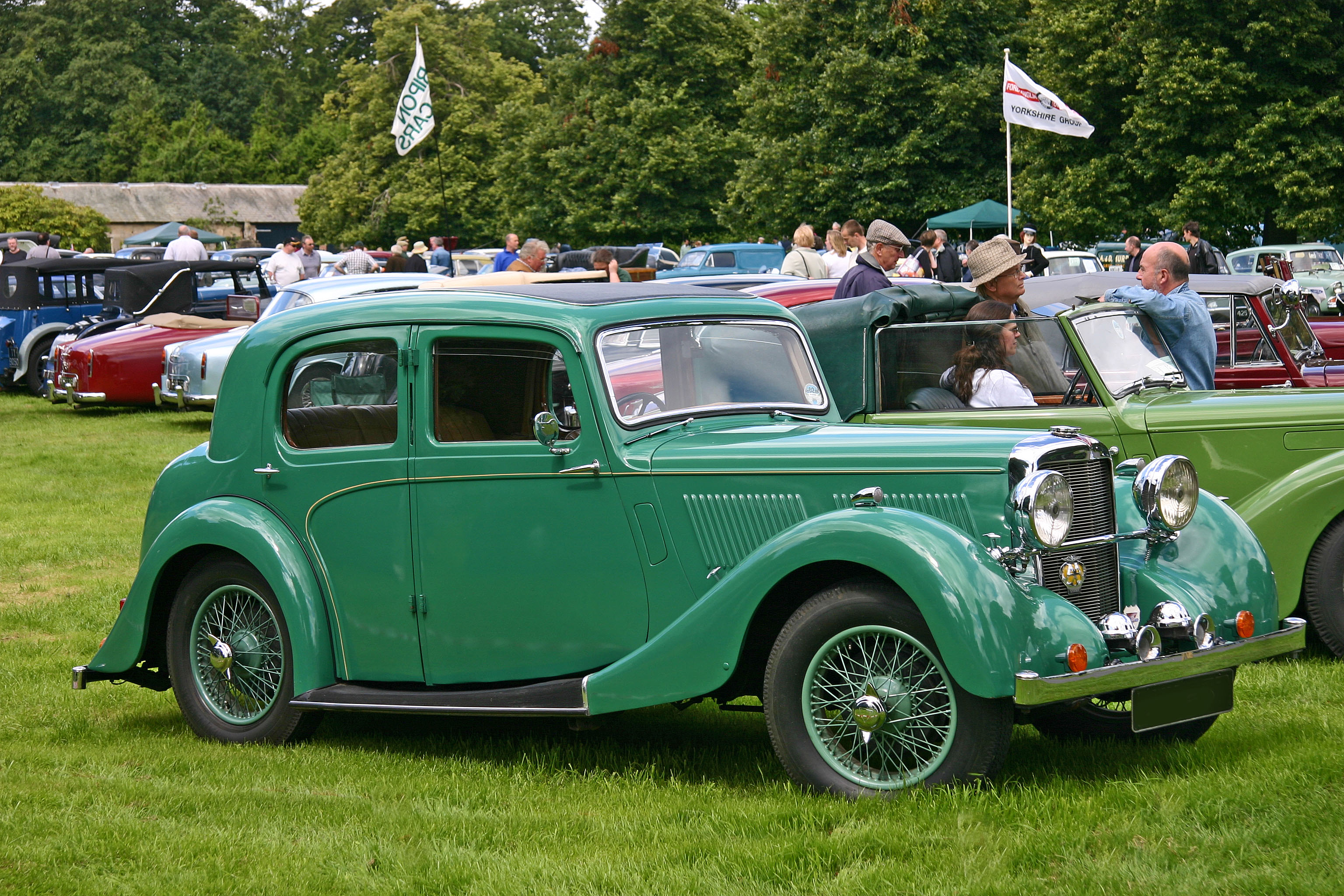
- Type II 12/70 sports saloon

Overview
- Manufacturer: Alvis
- Production: 1937–1940; 741 made
- Assembly: United Kingdom: Coventry, England

Body and chassis
- Body style: Sports saloon with luggage boot or 4-seater drophead coupé

Powertrain
- Engine: 1,842 cc OHV I4
- Transmission: Single plate clutch, 4-speed centrally changed by a short lever gearbox, synchromesh on 2nd, 3rd and top, half-floating spiral bevel driven axle

Dimensions
- Wheelbase: 106 in (2,692 mm) track 50 in (1,270 mm)
- Length: 170 in (4,318 mm)
- Width: 62 in (1,575 mm)
- Kerb weight: Saloon 25cwt

Chronology
- Predecessor: Alvis Firebird
- Successor: Alvis TA 14

Alvis 12/70 Engine

Overview
- Manufacturer: Alvis
- Production: 1937 to 1940

Layout
- Configuration: straight four
- Displacement: 1.842 L (112.4 cu in)
- Cylinder bore: 73 mm (2.9 in)
- Piston stroke: 110 mm (4.3 in)
- Cylinder block material: three bearing crankshaft pistons aluminium alloy
- Valvetrain: push-rod operated overhead valves with double springs camshaft driven by a triplex roller chain

Combustion
- Fuel system: single downdraught carburettor with an air silencer electrical petrol pump
- Fuel type: petrol
- Cooling system: forced water circulation thermostatically controlled

Output
- Power output: 63.5 bhp @ 4,250 rpm Tax rating 13.22hp

The Alvis 12/70 was announced by Alvis cars in 22 September 1937. It was a four-cylinder sports saloon or 4-seater drophead coupé related to the pricier six-cylinder Alvis Silver Crest.

Technical director and chief designer Smith-Clarke was fully occupied with a new factory to make Alvis's Gnome-Rhone radial engines so the 12/70 was designed by George Lanchester and it proved to be his last automobile design.

== Specification ==
=== Engine and gearbox ===
Alvis manufactured the four-cylinder 1,842 cc pushrod overhead valve engine which was similar to the engine of the Alvis Firebird but was, in fact, a new design. Its 63 hp (47 kW) was enough to propel the car to a top speed of about 80 mph (130 km/h). Alvis also designed and made the four-speed gearbox which had synchromesh on the top three speeds.

=== Steering brakes and suspension ===
Cam steering is by Marles and brakes by Bendix-Cowdrey. Suspension is by half-elliptic springs, those in the back are underslung, dampened by hydraulic shock absorbers. There is an easy jacking system.

=== Body ===
The standard catalogued four-door four-seater saloon or two-door four-seater drophead coupé bodywork was made for Alvis by Mulliners of Birmingham.

It was described by a motoring correspondent of The Times as follows:
The four-door body has four sidewindows and makes a comfortable four-seater; the doors have roll armrests and ashtrays and there is a central pull-down rest. The rear windows are "carried well back and allow a very fair view". The doors have slip pockets and glass louvres that conform to the body's lines. There is a cupboard in the instrument panel and the instruments and ashtray are centrally placed. There are two-way visors, independent wiper controls (left and right), a spring steering wheel and in its centre ignition, dip and switch (headlights), signalling and horn controls. There are ventilators in the scuttle, a sliding roof and a fully opening windscreen. The front seats are adjustable, the backrests will tip up and beneath them there are floor wells for the feet of the back passengers. A stabilising bumper and two horns are fitted at the front.

The whole of the back panel of the car was hinged at the bottom carrying the spare wheel on its inner side and it could be made to open just past the vertical. The correspondent reported "it does not make the most convenient arrangement for luggage.

== Road test ==
In a carefully worded brief portion of a full item about a 12/70 on test a Times correspondent reported in June 1938 that he considered the price high for a Twelve but that the value was there, the quietness and smoothness of running and the firmness yet gentleness of the controls. However he did comment that in view of the ordinary (sic) springing it travelled with remarkable evenness and held the road in a most stable way. 75 mph was the greatest speed in top gear. Price as tested £435, "a drophead coupé is also made at a rather higher figure".

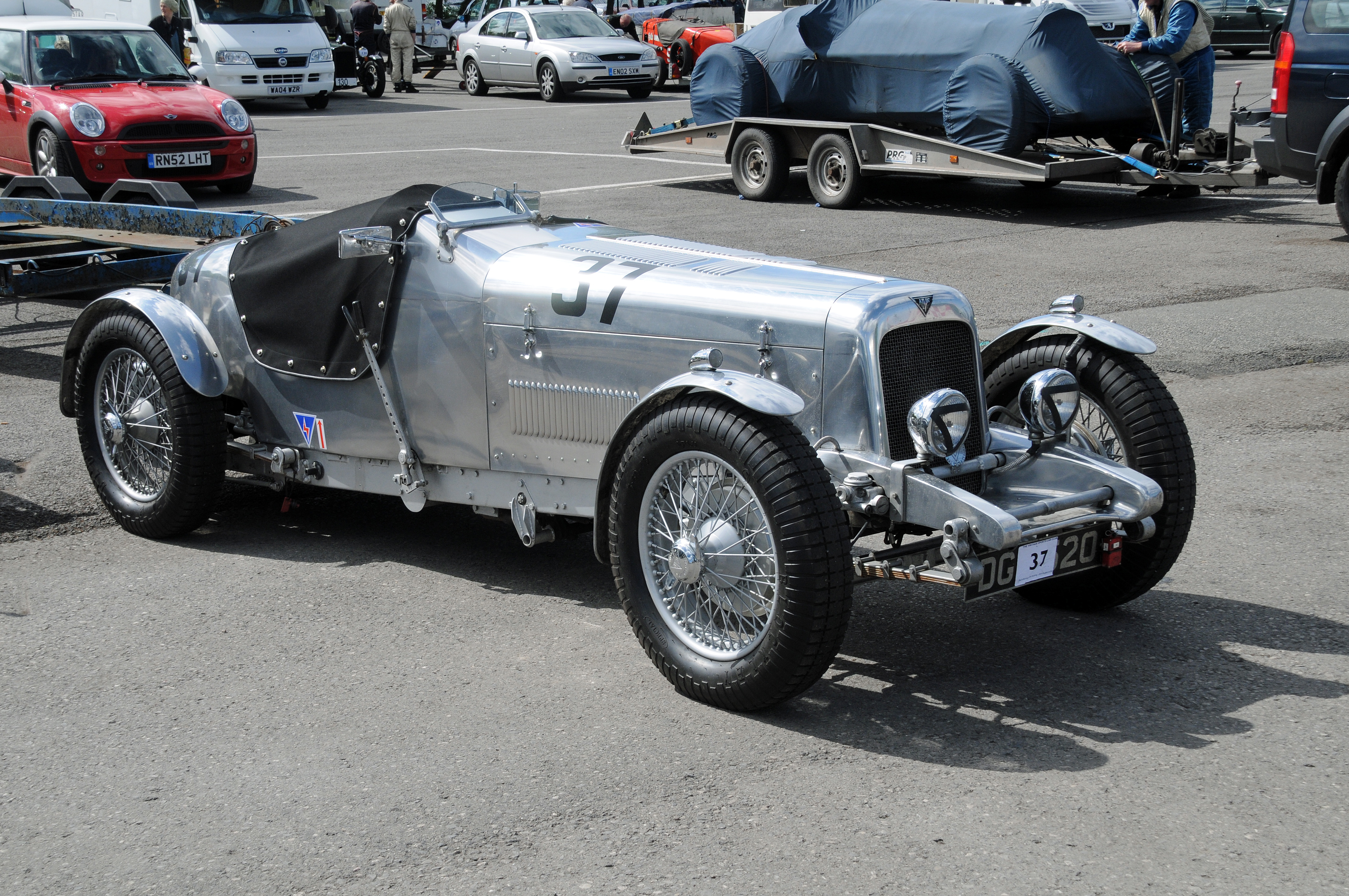
1938 car with sports-racing body

=== Production ===
A total of 741 cars were manufactured until 1940, with 121 still surviving. In 1945 the 12/70 was replaced by the modernized Alvis TA 14, but much of the 12/70 lived on in this post war model.

== Alvis Type II 12/70, roomier body ==
In September 1938 it was announced that more room and comfort had been given to the 12/70.

The lines of the car had been improved, the floor-level lowered and the body's extra length and width gave more head, leg and elbow room for driver and passengers. It was now easier to get into the back seat and all four seats had been redesigned to give better support. The spare wheel was moved outside the car and enclosed in a metal cover. Two handles were now provided to the boot door, one with a lock.

Otherwise the specification remained the same, as did the price at £435 and that of the drophead coupé was now £445. The chassis alone cost £315.

== Gallery ==
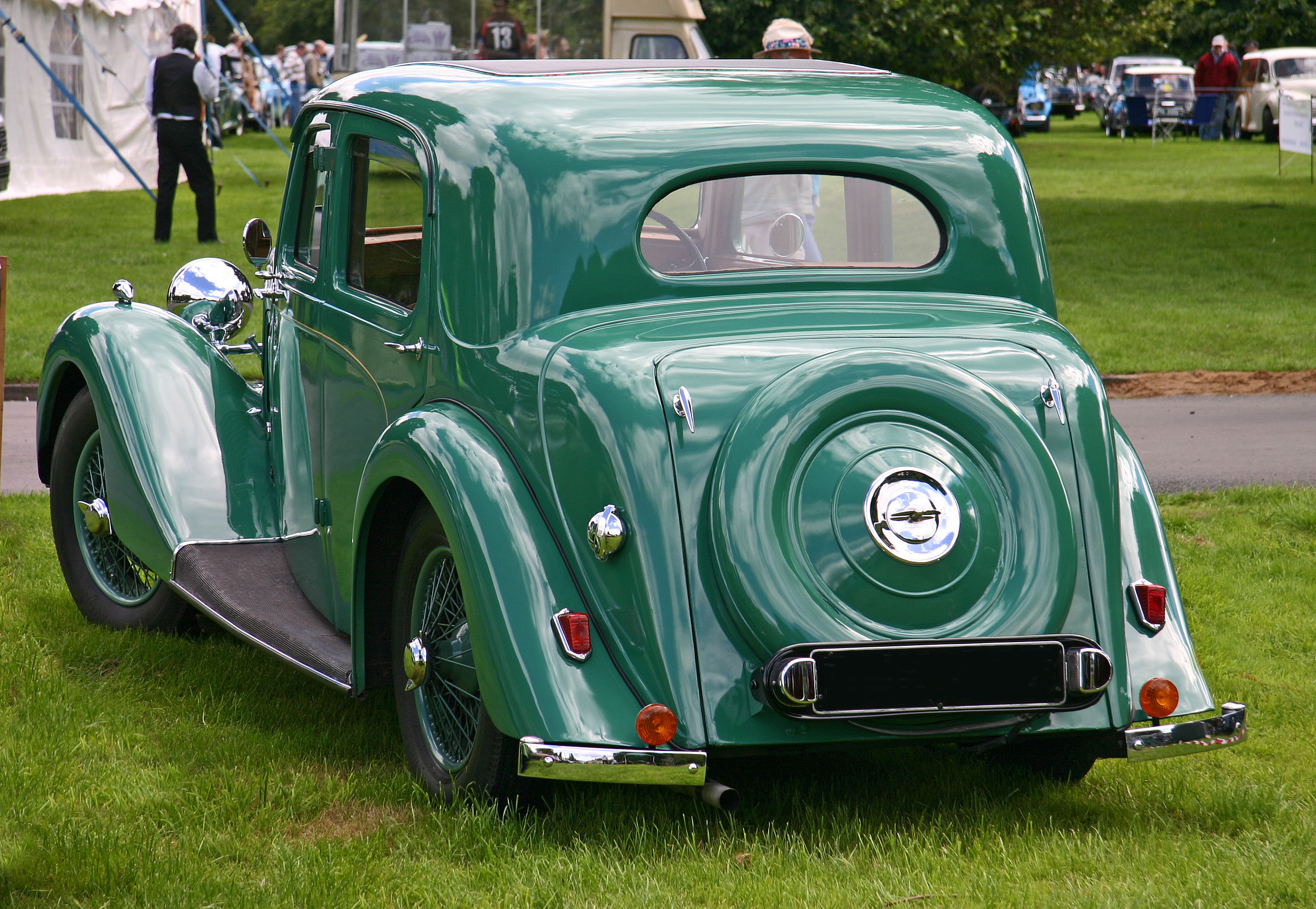
Type II 12/70 saloon rear

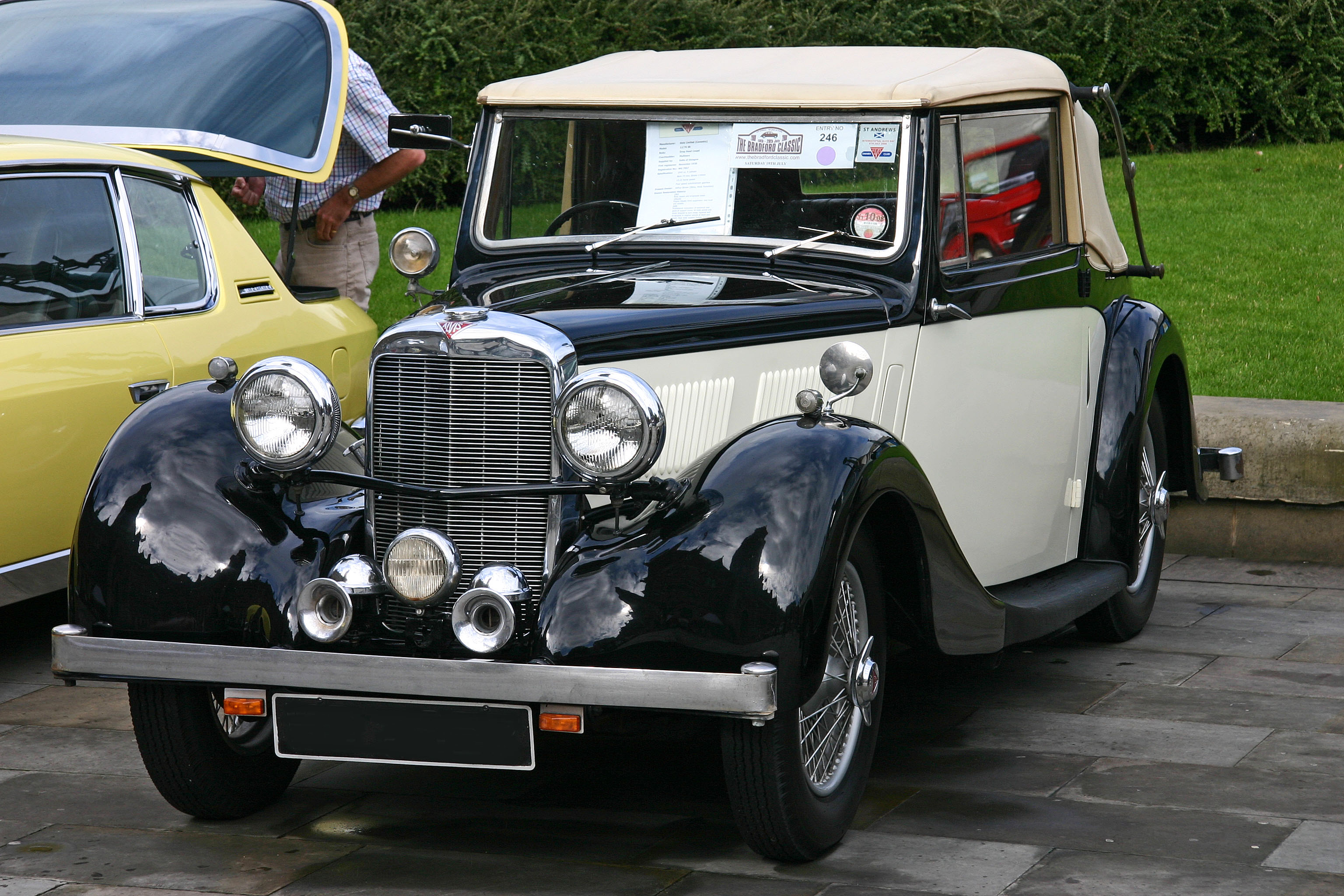
12/70 drophead coupé

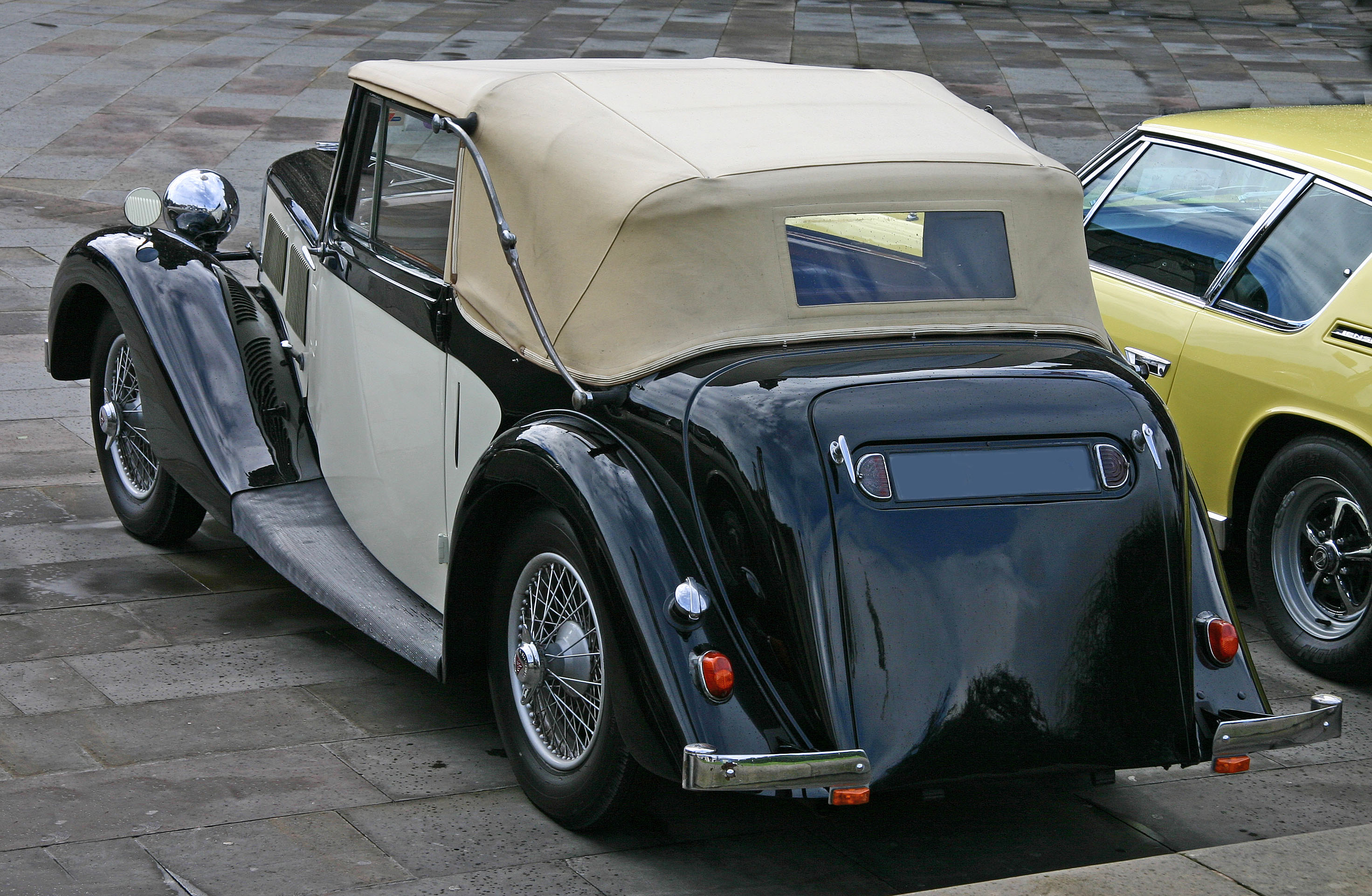
early 12/70 rear

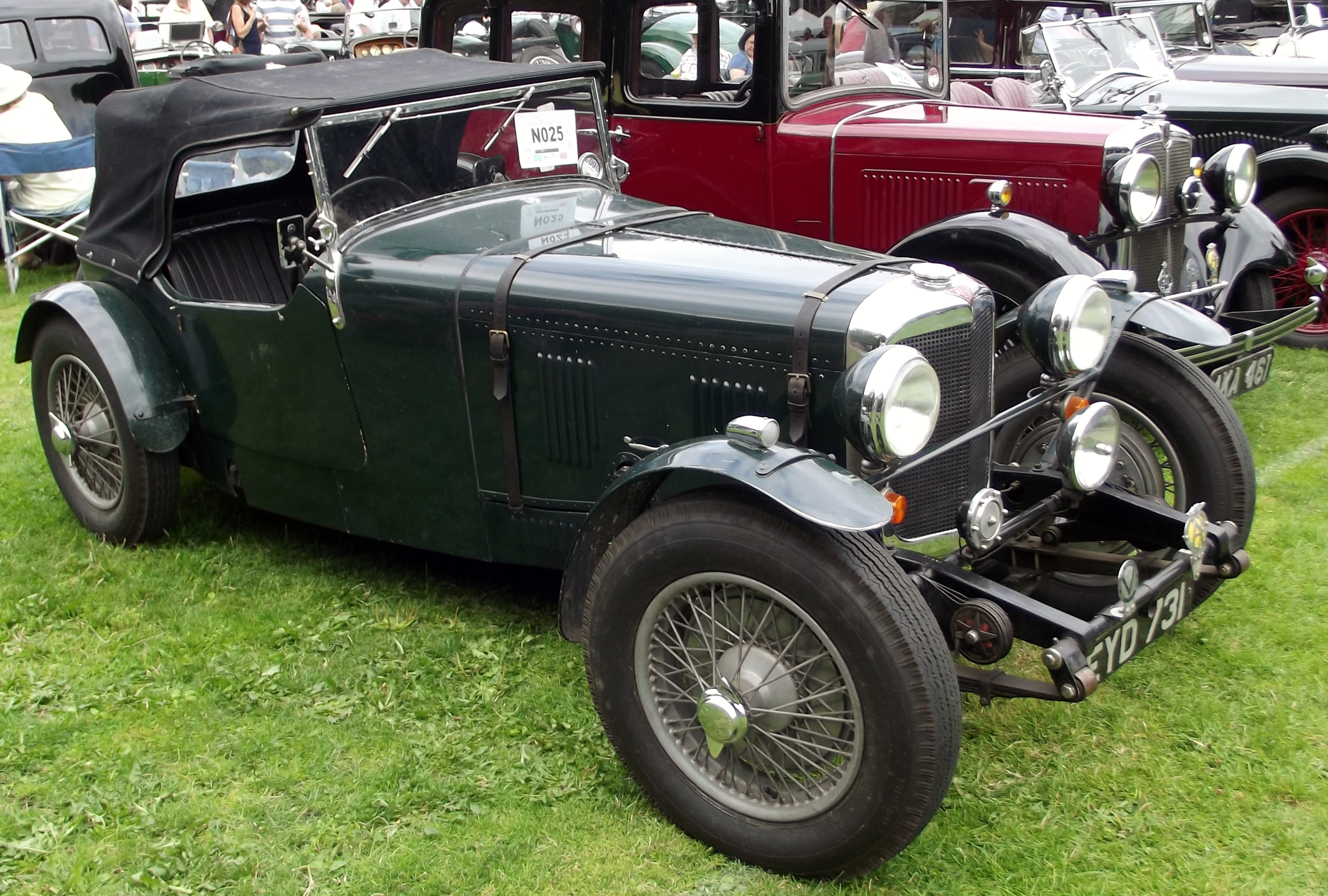
open 2-seater 1940
