= Silvercrest =

Silvercrest may refer to:

- Lidl brand Silvercrest
- Safran Silvercrest turbofan engine
- Alvis Silver Crest car
