= Alvis TB 14 =

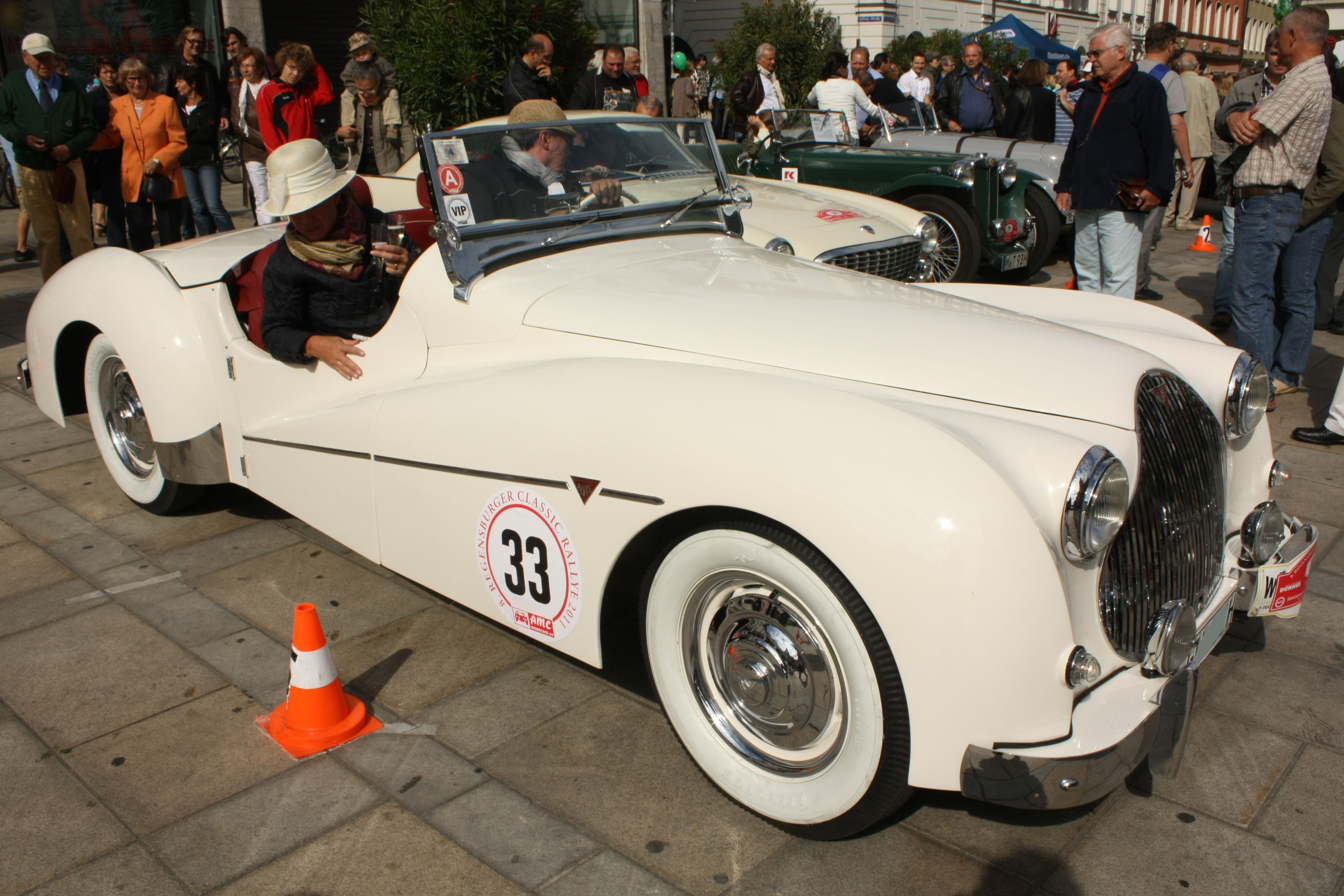

Overview
- Manufacturer: Alvis Cars
- Production: 1950; 100 produced
- Assembly: United Kingdom: Coventry, England

Body and chassis
- Body style: 2 door sports
- Layout: FR layout

Powertrain
- Engine: Alvis 1892 cc straight-4

Dimensions
- Wheelbase: 111.5 in (2,832 mm)
- Length: 177.5 in (4,508 mm)
- Width: 66 in (1,676 mm)

Chronology
- Successor: Alvis TB 21

The Alvis TB 14 is a British two-seater open car that was produced by Alvis cars, based on the running gear of the TA 14 saloon, and made only in 1950.

Alvis contracted AP Metalcraft, a Coventry coachbuilder, to produce the two-door open car body to fit on the TA 14 chassis. The doors are rear-hinged and have deeply cut-away tops. The car has very long, sweeping front wings and a fold-down windscreen. The radiator grille was controversial, being pear-shaped, with the bottom side bulges concealing the headlights which consequently were a long way from the sides of the car. The front sidelights were mounted in the bumpers. Both right and left hand drive versions were made.

The 1892 cc engine was slightly modified to produce 68 bhp (51 kW), 3 bhp (2.2 kW) more than the saloon engine by fitting twin SU carburettors. The TA 14 suspension was retained, with its non-independent leaf springing all round. As the car is lighter than the TA 14, the final drive ratio was changed from 4.875:1 to 4.3:1, helping to increase the top speed and improving economy.

The car could reach 80 mph (130 km/h), but its high price of £1,276 on the home market limited sales.

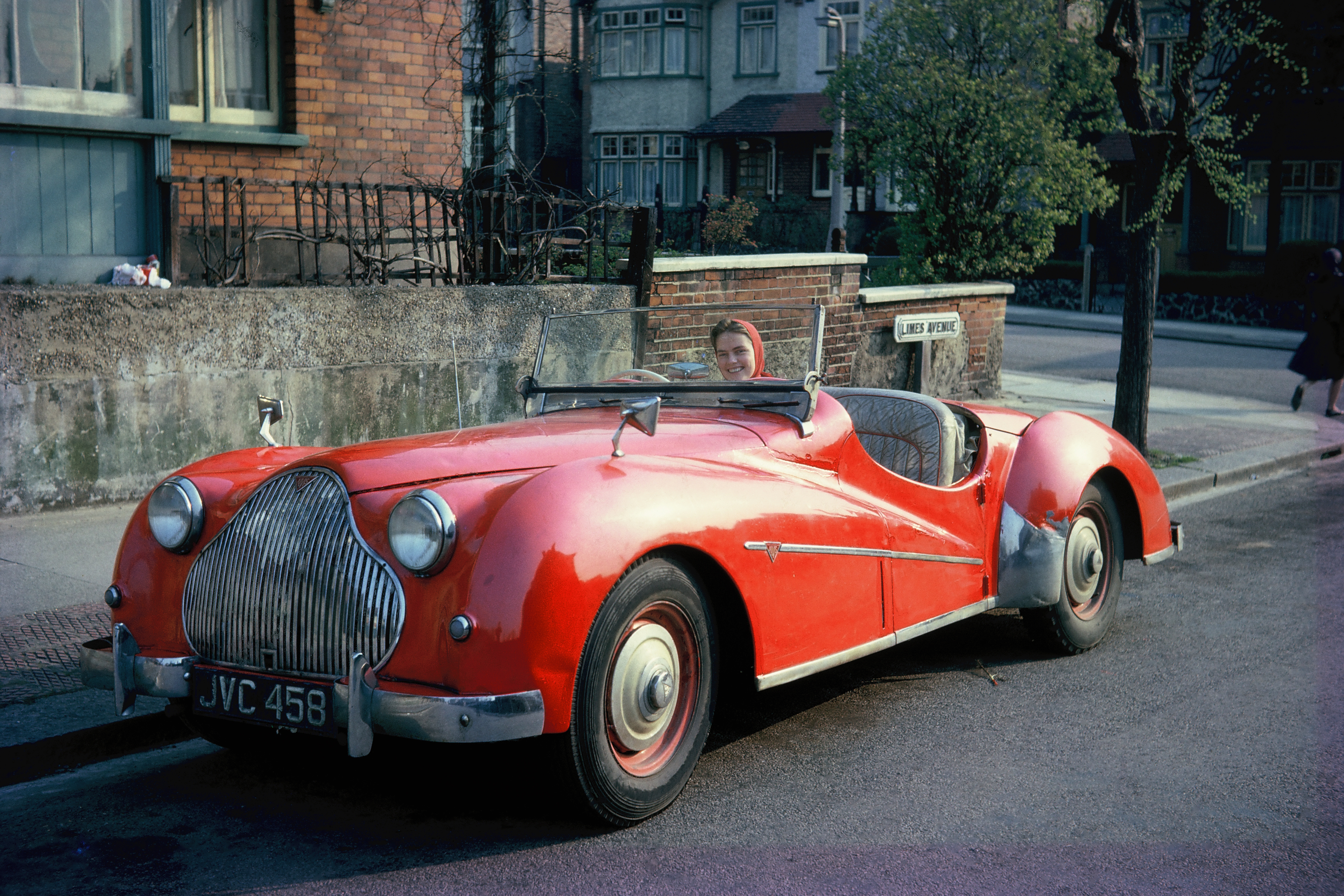
Alvis TB 14 in Barnes London in 1960

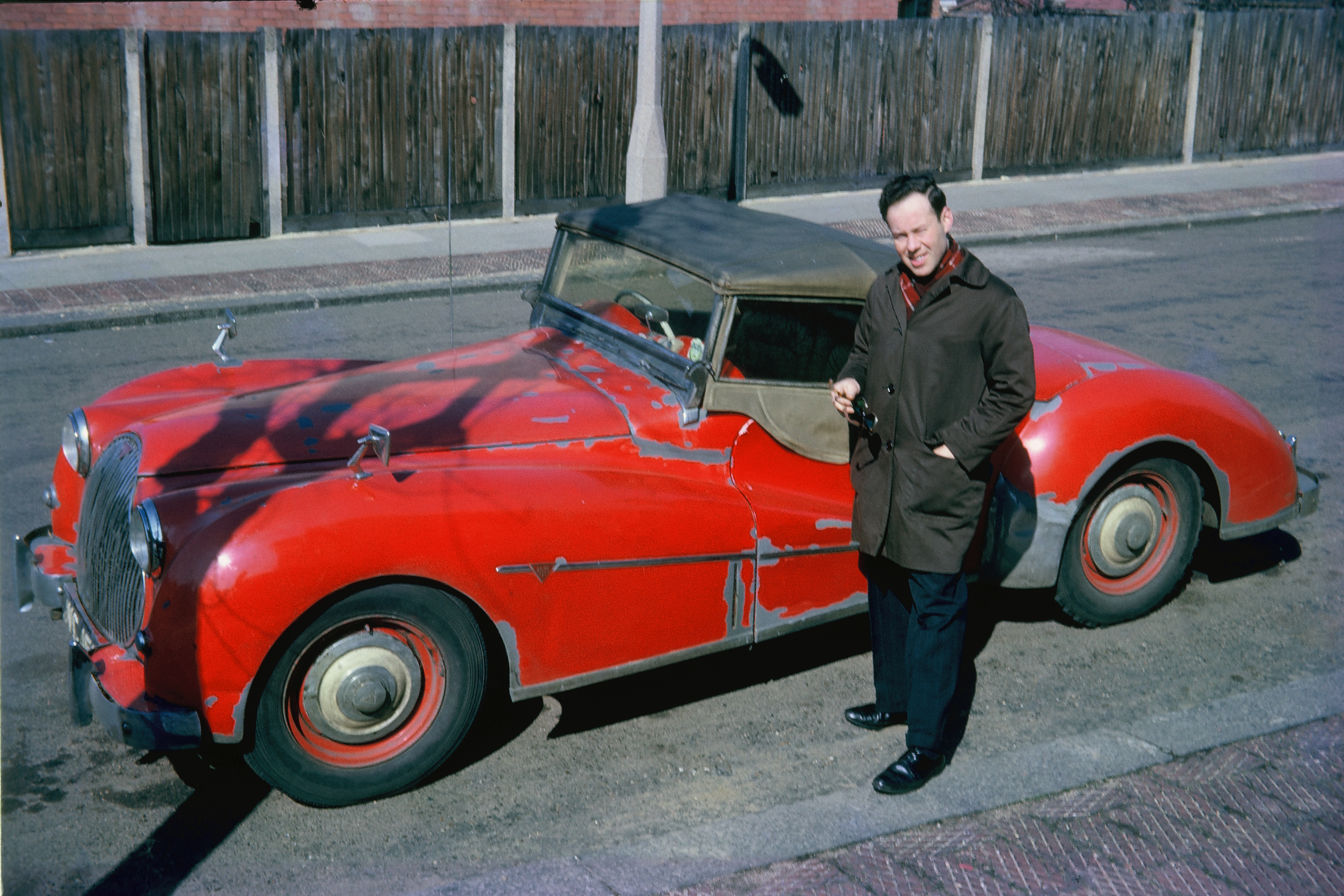
The paint flaked off the aluminium body, but it didn't rust!
