= Alvis TB 21 =

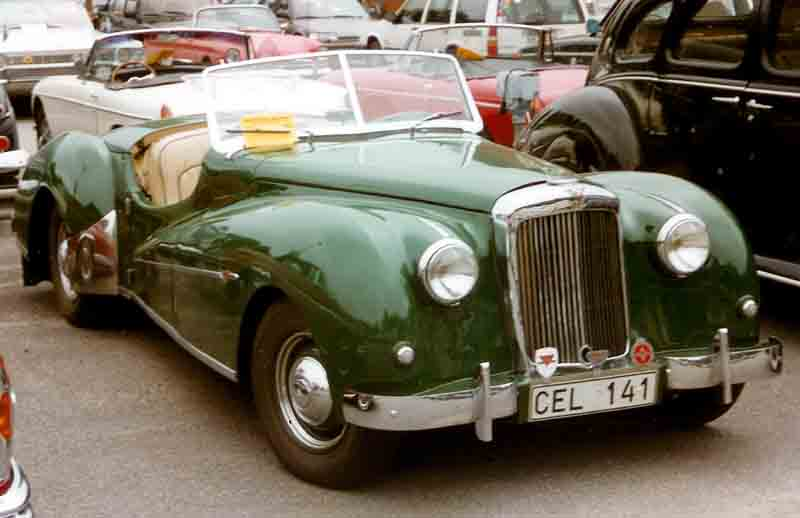

Overview
- Manufacturer: Alvis Cars
- Production: 1951; 31 produced
- Assembly: United Kingdom: Coventry, England

Body and chassis
- Body style: 2 door sports
- Layout: FR layout

Powertrain
- Engine: Alvis 2993 cc Straight-6

Dimensions
- Wheelbase: 111.5 in (2,832 mm)
- Length: 177.5 in (4,508 mm)
- Width: 66 in (1,676 mm)

Chronology
- Predecessor: Alvis TB 14

The Alvis TB 21 was a two-seater open car produced by Alvis cars for 1951 only. It was based on the running gear of the TA 21 saloon.

Alvis had previously contracted AP Metalcraft, a Coventry coachbuilder, to produce the TB 14 two door open car body to fit on the TA 14 chassis. With the replacement of the TA 14 by the larger TA 21 in 1950, AP were asked to modify their design for the new running gear. The TB 21 dropped the controversial grille used on the TB 14 in favour of the traditional Alvis one. The doors, rear hinged, were heavily cut away at the top and the windscreen could be folded flat.

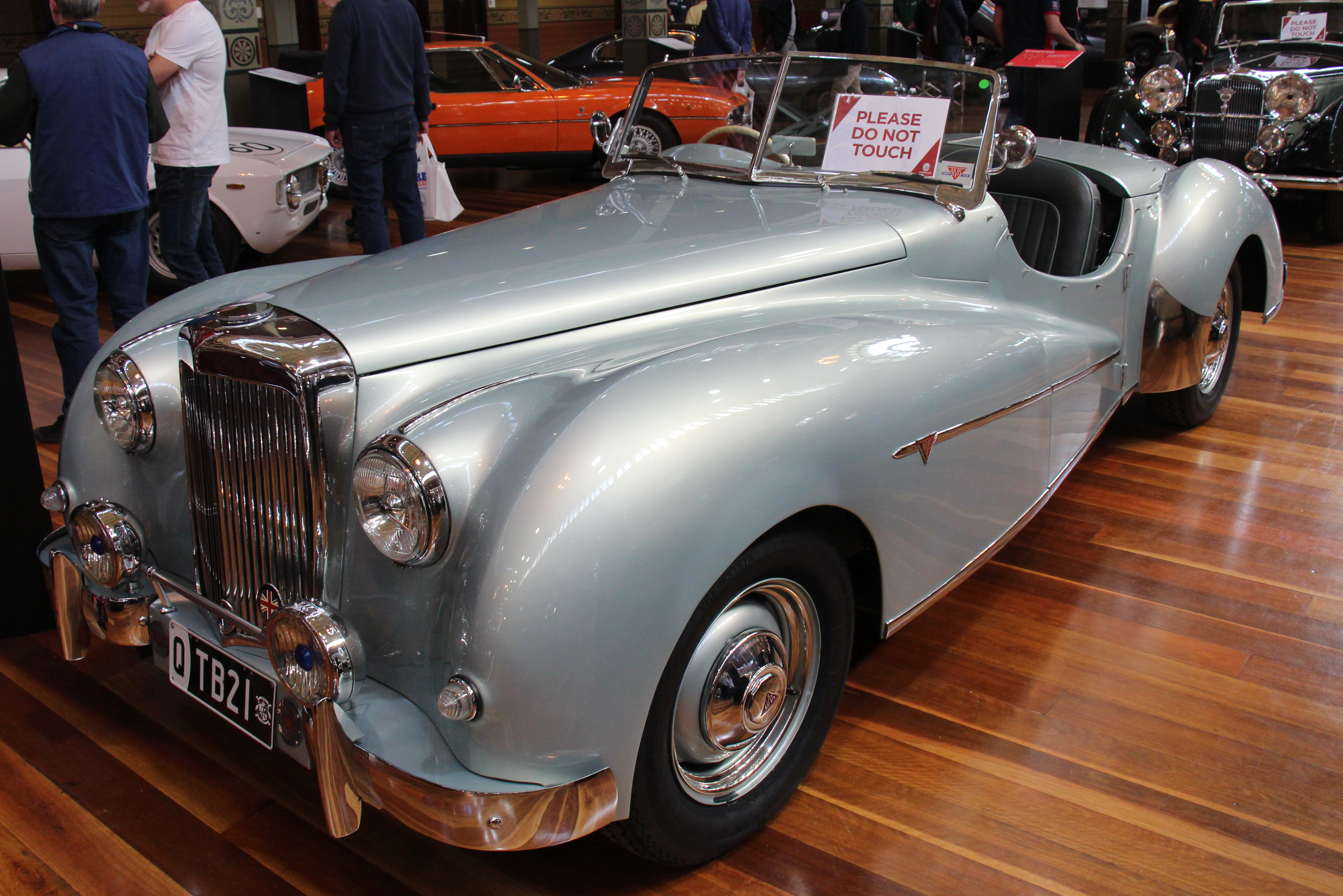
1952 Alvis TB 21

The 2993 cc engine was slightly modified to produce 90 bhp (67 kW) with a single SU carburettor replacing the Solex one used on the saloon. The TA 21 suspension was retained, independent at the front using coil springs with leaf springs at the rear. As the car was lighter than the TA 21 the final drive ratio was changed from 4.09:1 to 3.77:1 helping to increase the top speed and improving economy.

The car could reach 95 mph (153 km/h) but was very expensive at £1598 on the home market resulting in limited sales.
