= Alvis Firefly =

Car manufactured by Alvis

Overview
- Manufacturer: Alvis
- Production: 1932–1934

Body and chassis
- Layout: Front-engine, rear-wheel-drive

Chronology
- Predecessor: Alvis 12/50
- Successor: Alvis Firebird

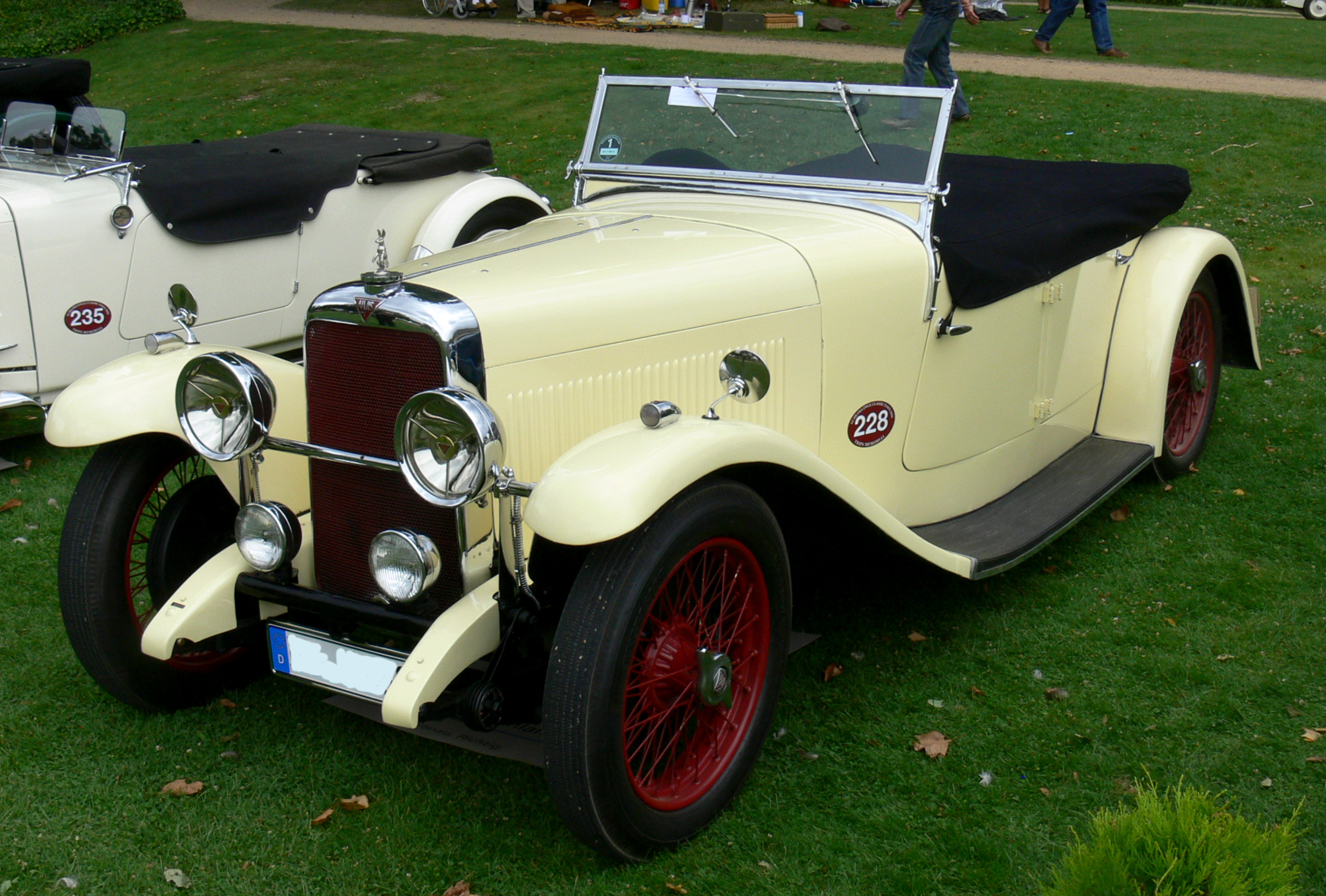
1932 Alvis Firefly Roadster at Schloss Dyck, Germany

The Alvis Firefly is a car manufactured by Alvis from 1932 until 1934. It followed on from the 12/50 TJ model.

The car has a straight-four engine with overhead valves. The engine, with a single SU carburettor and a displacement of 1,496 cm^{3}, develops 50 bhp (37 kW) at 4,500 rpm. The engine is essentially the same as that of the 12/50 TH model from 1927, and of the 12/50 SD from 1927 to 1929. This made it economical to manufacture, and put the car in the 1.5-litre class, which was popular at that time.

A roadster was introduced in 1932. In 1933, a four-door tourer, a saloon, and a two-door convertible were introduced, all under the name Alvis Firefly 12. The car has rigid axles at the front and rear, from which it is suspended by semi-elliptical leaf springs. The wheelbase, the type of suspension and, in some cases, the bodies, corresponded to the previous straight-six Alvis Silver Eagle SE and TB. The top speed was about 71 miles per hour (114 km/h), depending on the design.

In 1934, the Alvis Firebird replaced all the Firefly models. In all, 904 Firefly Roadsters and 871 Firefly 12s were built.

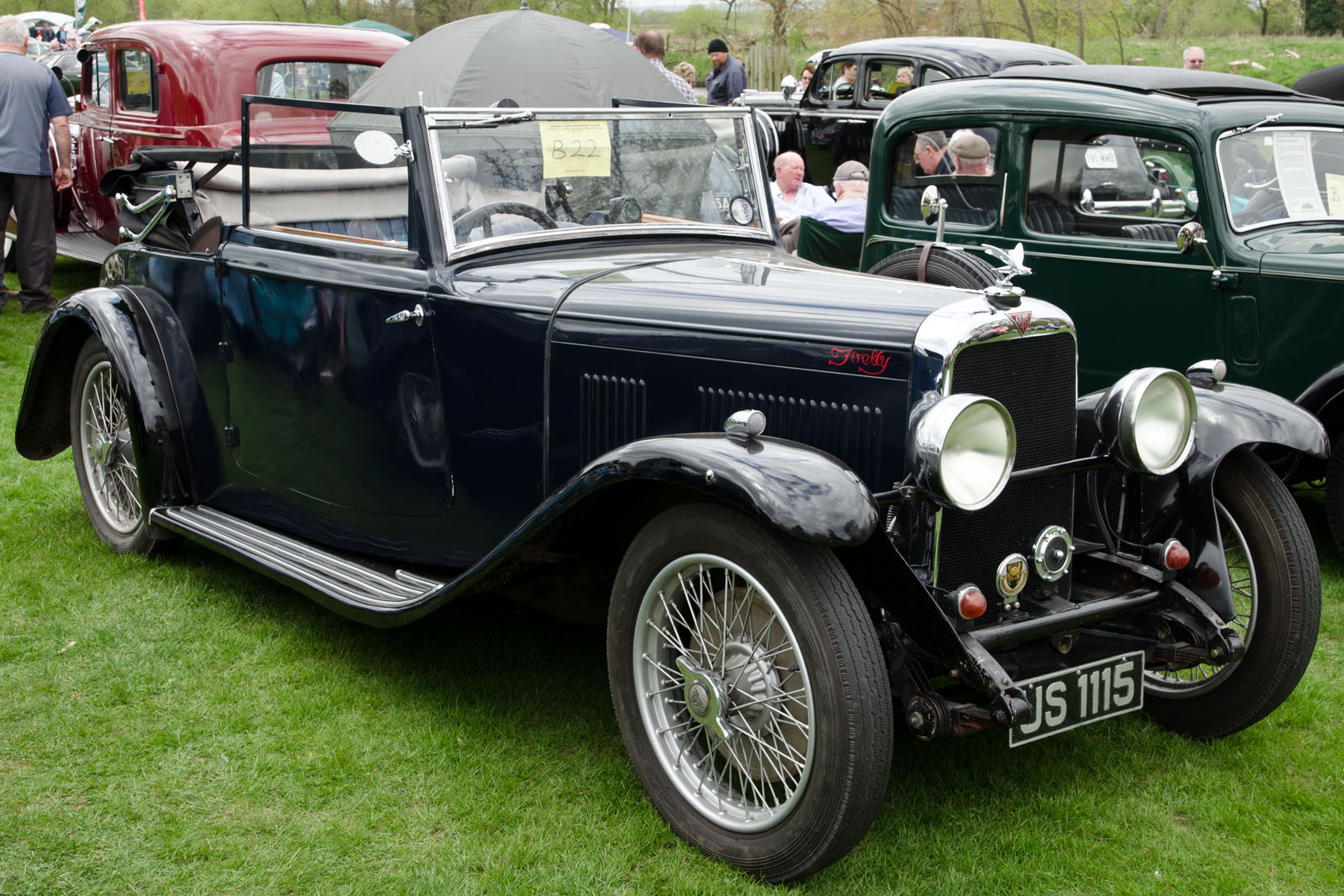
1933 Alvis Firefly 12

== Sources ==
- Culshaw, David; Horrobin, Peter (1997). The Complete Catalogue of British Cars 1895–1975. Dorchester: Veloce Publishing. pp. 35–40. ISBN 1-874105-93-6.
