= Alvis 14.75 =

The Alvis 14.75 is a car manufactured by the British car manufacturer Alvis from 1927 to 1929. It was the first Alvis with a six-cylinder engine.

== Description ==
The car has a straight-six engine with overhead valves, fed by a single Solex carburettor. Its bore and stroke are 63 mm × 100 mm, giving a displacement of 1,870 cc . The front and rear axles were supported by semi-elliptical longitudinal leaf springs.

The 14.75 was offered with two different wheelbases: 2,845 mm for two-seater versions, and 3,010 mm for four-seaters. Three body types were offered: saloon, convertible and roadster. In 1930, after selling some 492 examples, the 14.75 was replaced by the Alvis Silver Eagle.

== Bibliography ==
- Culshaw, David; Horrobin, Peter (1997). The Complete Catalogue of British Cars 1895–1975. Dorchester: Fast Publishing. pp. 35–40. ISBN 1-874105-93-6.
