= Alvis Silver Eagle =

The Alvis Silver Eagle was a series of passenger cars produced by Alvis, initially from 1930 to 1931 as the successor to the 14.75 model, and then from 1934 to 1936.

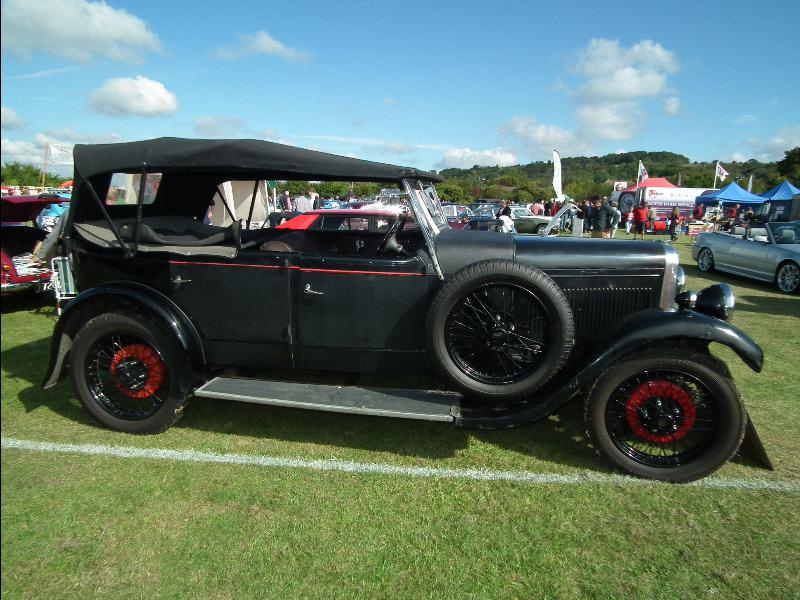
Alvis Silver Eagle 1930 - Kop Hill 2012

All vehicles shared an inline six-cylinder engine with overhead valves and two rigid axles suspended on longitudinal leaf springs. All models were available as touring cars, roadsters, saloons, or convertibles.

== Model history ==
The SA and SD models appeared in 1930. Both had a wheelbase of 2,845 mm. The SA was slightly shorter at 3,962 mm, but wider at 1,600 mm, and had a 2,148 cc engine (bore × stroke = 67.5 mm × 100 mm), producing 72 brake horsepower (54 kW). The SD was 4,013 mm long and only 1,511 mm wide; however, its engine had a smaller displacement of 1,991 cc (bore × stroke = 65 mm × 100 mm).With its greater width and larger displacement, the SA was suited to more comfort-oriented body styles, while the narrower, smaller-displacement SD was suited to sportier body styles, which could also be used in motorsports in the then-popular 16 hp (2-litre) class. Both engines received their fuel mixture via three SU carburettors. The car's top speed was 85 miles per hour (137 km/h).

In 1931, both models were replaced by the TB and SE. Their chassis had a longer wheelbase of 3,010 mm, and the vehicle length had grown to 4,115 mm. The TB was equipped with the larger engine of the SA, which, however, only had a single Zenith carburettor.

From 1932, Alvis sought to position itself in higher market segments with new six-cylinder models. The Speed 20 was slightly longer and significantly sportier, while the Crested Eagle, added in 1933, was considerably longer. After the two new, larger models had established themselves, Alvis presented another Silver Eagle model in 1934. The SF model adopted the wheelbase and engine of the TB. However, the car's length had increased to 4,255 mm and its width to 1,588 mm, and the engine was again fed by three SU carburettors. The top speed was now 75 miles per hour (120 km/h).

In mid-1935, the SF was replaced by the SG model. While the body remained the same, the engine now had a 110 mm stroke, resulting in a displacement of 2,362 cc. This engine produced 66 bhp (48.5 kW) at 4200 rpm. The three SU carburettors remained. The top speed also remained unchanged.

In 1936, after the production of some 2,690 examples, the series was replaced by the Silver Crest model.

== Gallery ==
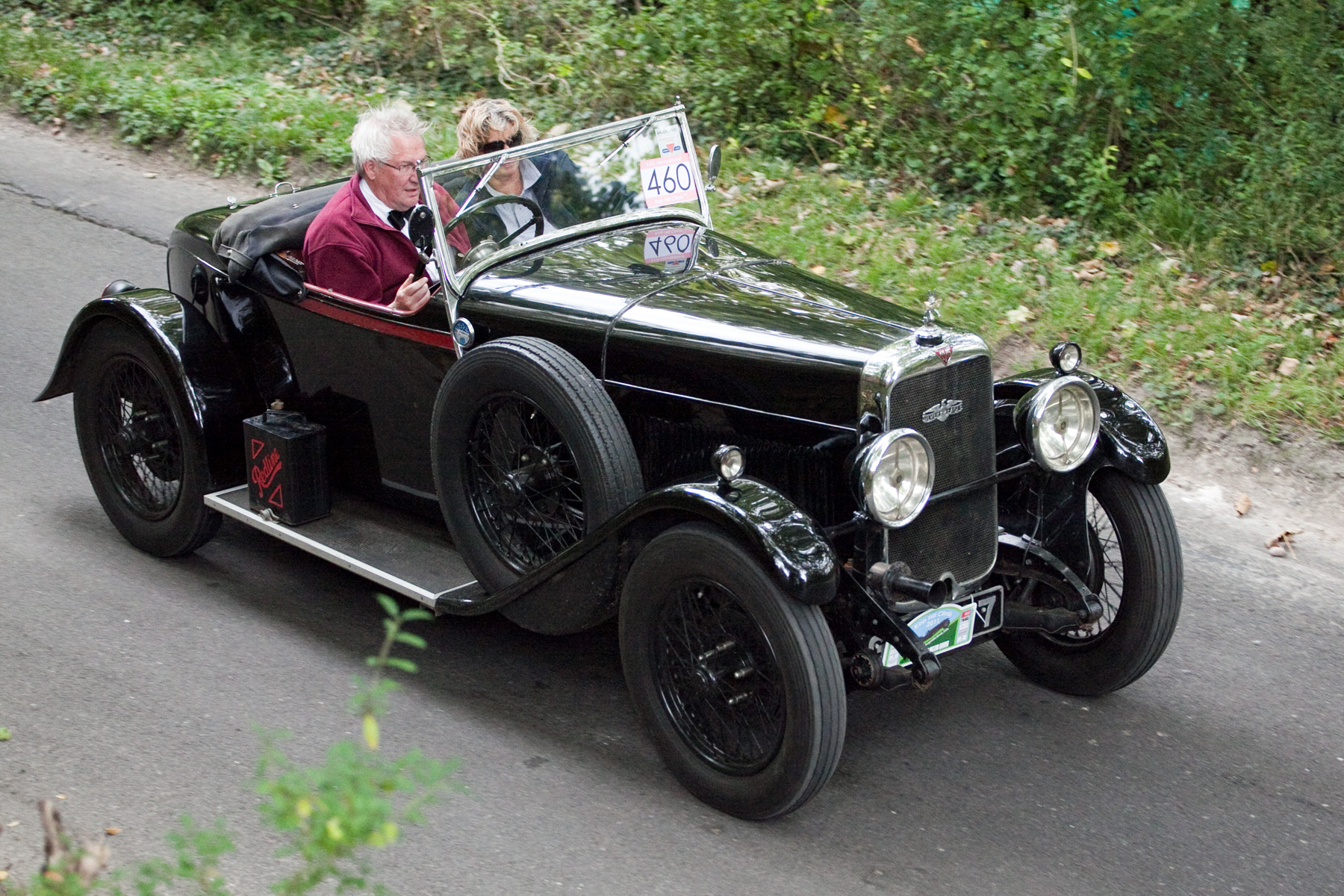
1930 Alvis Silver Eagle SE at Kop Hill Climb, 2011

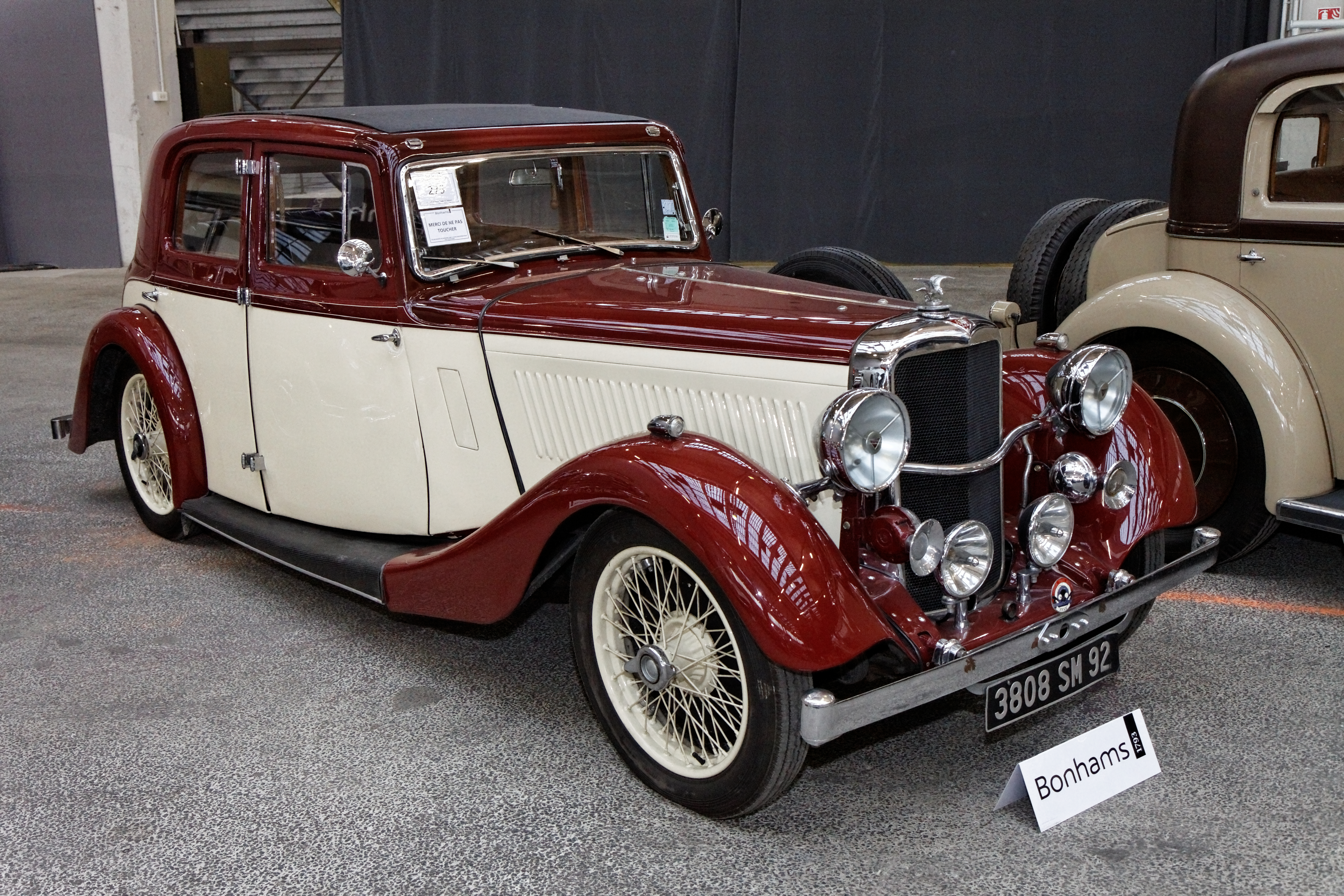
Alvis Silver Eagle SG Saloon

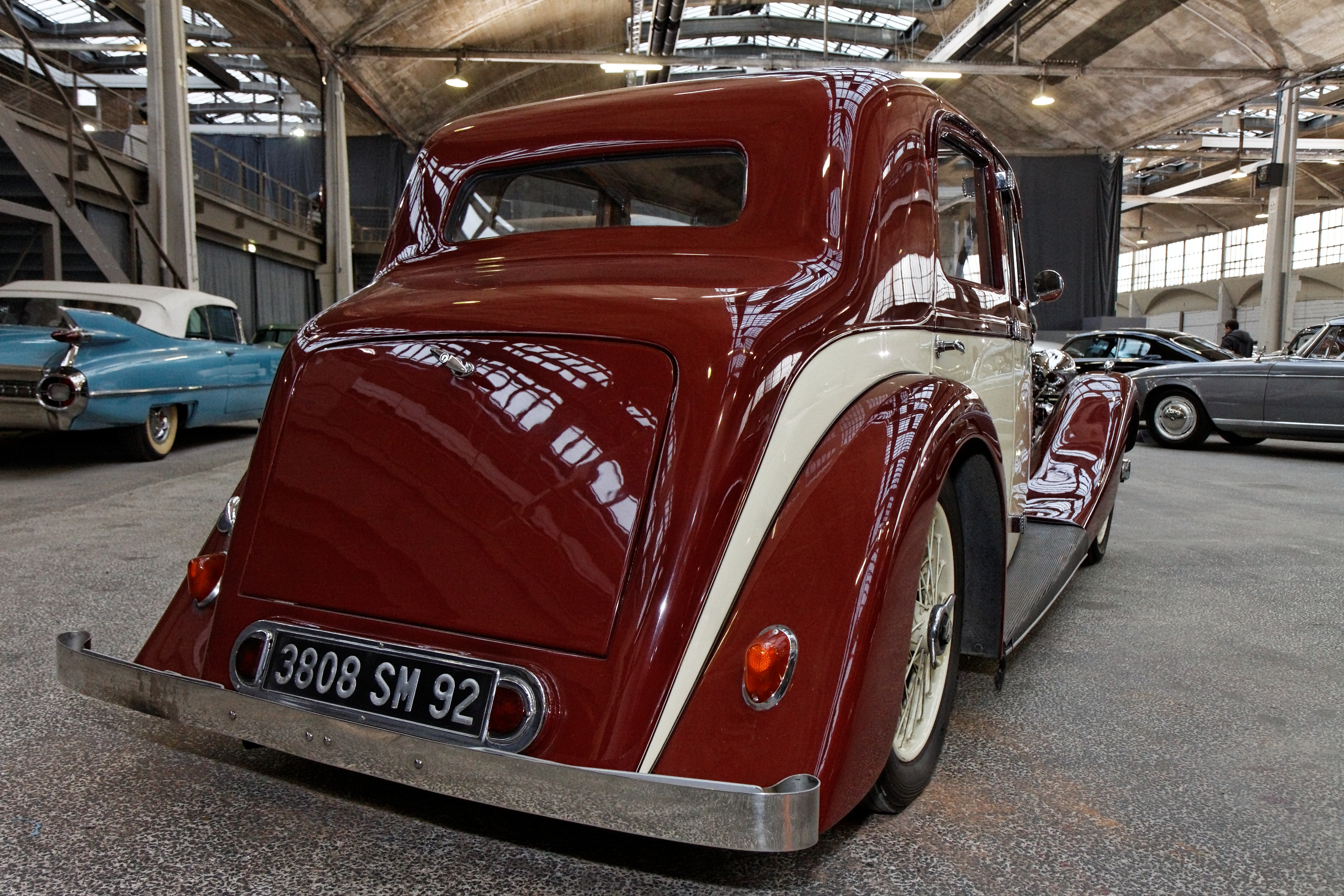
Alvis Silver Eagle SG Saloon

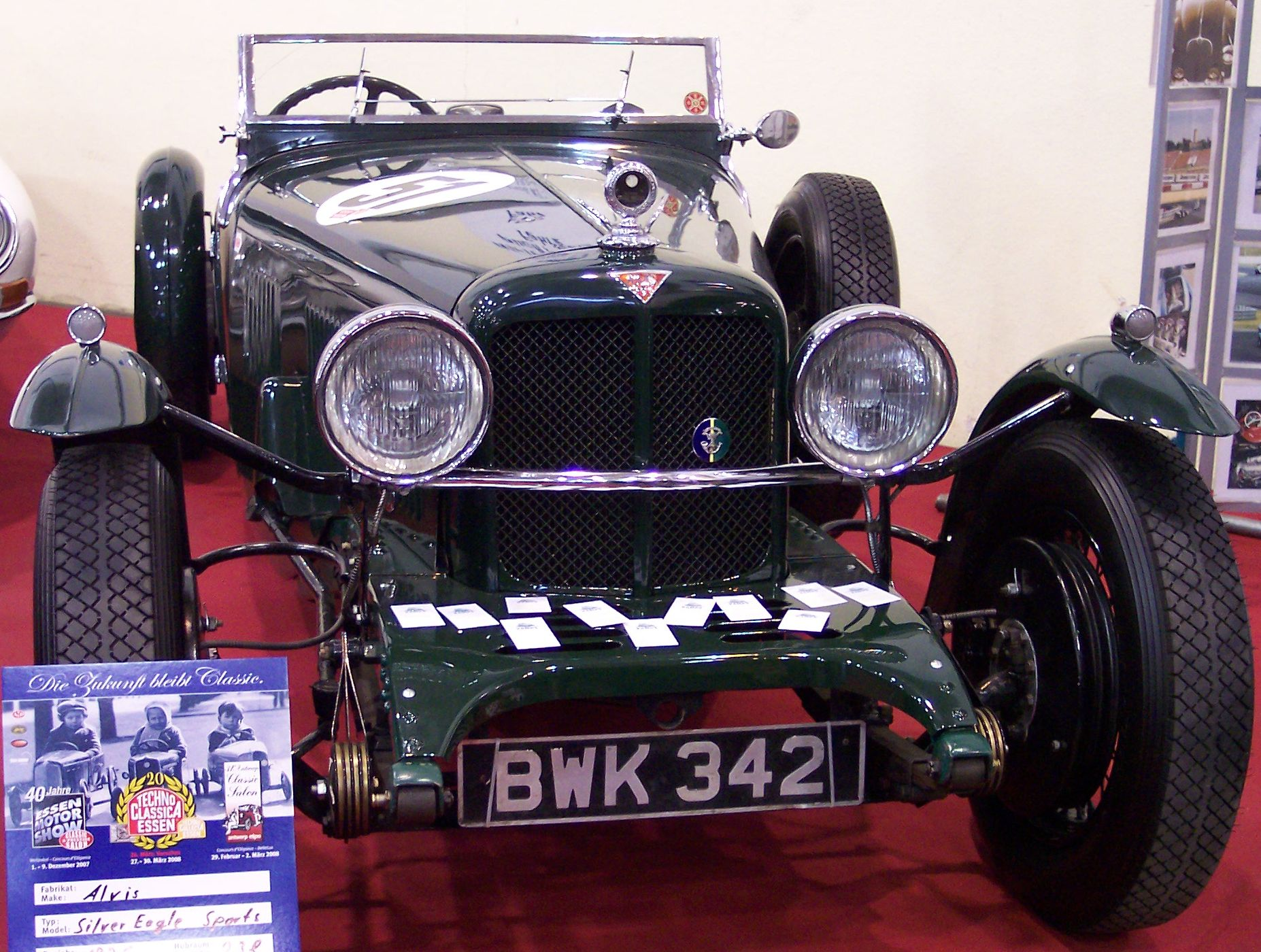
Alvis Silver Eagle Sports Roadster (1936)

== Sources ==
- Culshaw, David; Horrobin, Peter (1997). The Complete Catalogue of British Cars 1895–1975. Dorchester: Veloce Publishing. pp. 35–40. ISBN 1-874105-93-6.
