= Alvis Firebird =

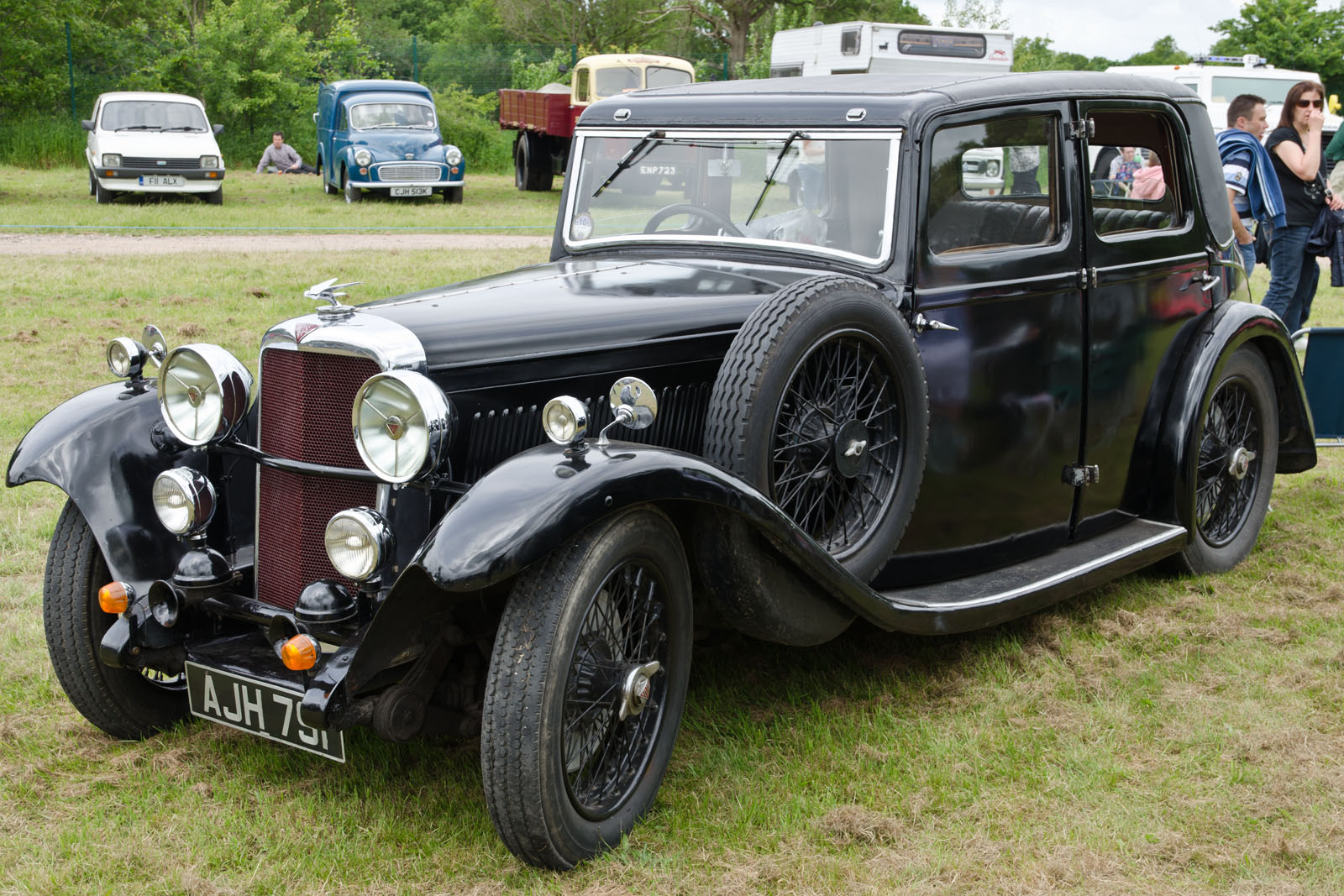
- 4-door sports saloon, 1935

Overview
- Manufacturer: Alvis
- Production: 1935–1939; 449 made
- Assembly: United Kingdom: Coventry, England

Body and chassis
- Class: sporting chassis, bodied to suit owner's requirements
- Body style: Tourer, coupé or saloon

Powertrain
- Engine: 1842cc Straight-4

Dimensions
- Wheelbase: 118.5 in (3,010 mm)
- Length: 173 in (4,394 mm)
- Width: 64 in (1,626 mm)

The Alvis Firebird was a British touring car made between 1935 and 1939 by Alvis Ltd in Coventry.

Developed from the Alvis Firefly, 449 Firebirds were produced, as a two-door Tourer, a 2+2 sports tourer, a two-door drophead Coupé, and a four-door Saloon.

Powered by an 1842 cc 4-cylinder overhead-valve Alvis engine, it had an aluminium body on an ash wood frame. As with other Alvis cars, the Firebird was built as a rolling chassis then sent to the coachbuilders Cross & Ellis, to be finished to the customer's requirements, so all Alvis Firebirds are different. The Firebird had an all-synchromesh gearbox, and the chassis was lubricated by grease nipples under the bonnet.

In 1939 World War II halted Alvis car production to make aircraft engines, and a German Luftwaffe bomb destroyed the Alvis car factory in 1940.

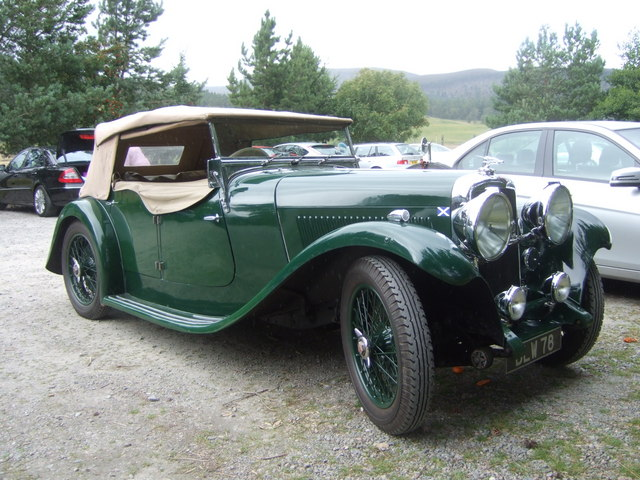
4-door sports tourer by Cross & Ellis
