= Alvis TA 14 =

Alvis Fourteen /TA 14
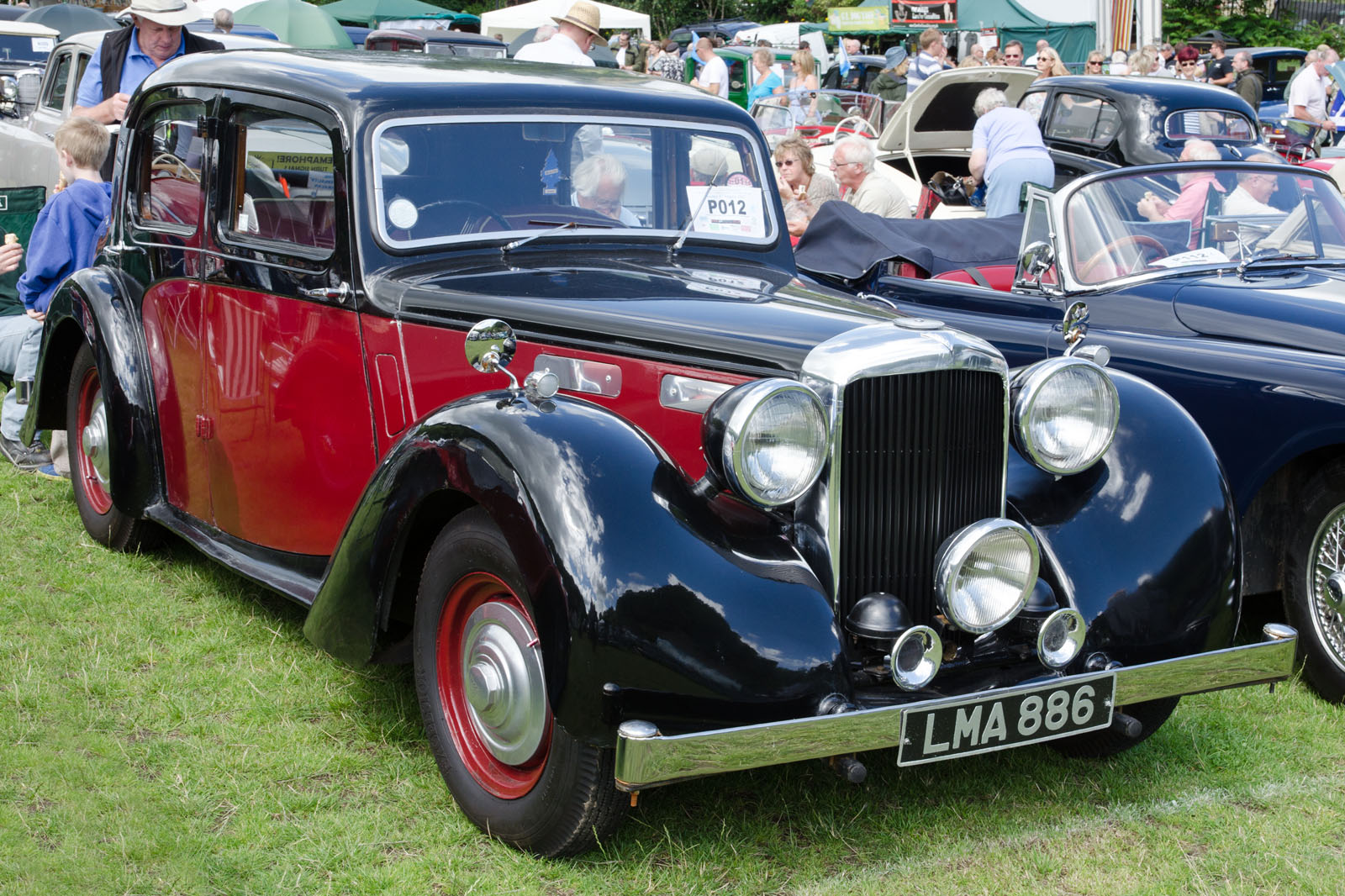
- Fourteen sports saloon 1949

Overview
- Manufacturer: Alvis Cars
- Production: 1946–1950; 3,311 produced
- Assembly: United Kingdom: Coventry, England

Body and chassis
- Body style: 4-door 4-light sports saloon by Mulliners; drophead coupé by Tickford or Carbodies
- Layout: FR layout

Powertrain
- Engine: Alvis 1892 cc Straight-4
- Transmission: gearbox 4-speed manual with synchromesh; dry single plate clutch Borg & Beck type 9 A6-G; open Hardy Spicer propeller shaft to hypoid bevel final drive unit

Dimensions
- Wheelbase: 108 in (2,743 mm); Track 54 in (1,372 mm)
- Length: 174.5 in (4,432 mm)
- Width: 66 in (1,676 mm)
- Height: 61 in (1,549 mm) saloon
- Kerb weight: Saloon 28 cwt, 3,136 lb (1,422 kg)

Chronology
- Predecessor: Alvis Twelve or 12/70
- Successor: Alvis Three Litre or TA21

Alvis 14

Overview
- Manufacturer: Alvis

Layout
- Configuration: Straight 4-cylinders
- Displacement: 1,892 cc (115.5 cu in)
- Cylinder bore: 74 mm (2.91 in)
- Piston stroke: 110 mm (4.33 in)
- Cylinder block material: cast iron monobloc with cast aluminium crankcase. the 3-bearing crankshaft is both statically and dynamically balanced
- Valvetrain: overhead, tappets pushrods and rockers, single camshaft driven by triplex chain. inlet 35 mm slightly larger than exhaust valves 32 mm.
- Compression ratio: 6.9:1

Combustion
- Fuel system: siamesed inlet ports, cast aluminium manifold, single horizontal 38 mm S.U. Electric pump by S.U. from petrol tank
- Management: Lucas 12-volt
- Fuel type: low octane Pool petrol
- Cooling system: water, pump and fan

Output
- Power output: 65 bhp (48 kW; 66 PS) @4,000 rpm; Tax horsepower 13.58

Chronology
- Predecessor: Alvis 12/70
- Successor: none

The Alvis TA 14, also called the Alvis Fourteen, was the first car that the car maker and defence contractor Alvis produced after World War II. The entire car factory had been destroyed on the night of Thursday 14 November 1940. Announced in November 1946, it was made until 1950, when its postwar austerity 1900 cc engine was replaced by the 2993 cc 26.25 HP (tax rating) Alvis Three Litre or TA 21.

== First postwar Alvis ==
The Fourteen was available as a four-door sports saloon built for Alvis by Mulliners of Birmingham. Tickford and Carbodies drophead versions were also offered. When compared with the 12/70 car it replaced, the interior is 4 inches wider, and the distance between rear-seat armrests is increased by almost 5 inches.

=== Engine ===
The 1892 cc engine is a slightly larger-bore version of the one used in the 12/70, and produces 65 bhp (48 kW). It has a single SU type H 4-inch side-draught carburettor. The inlet valves are larger than those on the 12/70, and the triplex chain drive has the addition of an automatic tensioner. The exhaust system was extensively revised, and the direction of flow of cooling water around the engine was substantially changed.

=== Brakes suspension steering ===
The body is mounted on an updated pre-war Alvis 12/70 chassis that is wider and longer, but retains rigid-axle leaf spring suspension. Employing Silentbloc bushes (except at the front of the front springs to maintain steering precision), it is controlled by double acting Armstrong hydraulic dampers. Hypoid bevel final drive was fitted for the first time, greatly reducing the height of the transmission tunnel. Steering is by Marles, with a spring spoked steering wheel. Mechanically operated brakes are two-leading-shoe type by Girling. Disc wheels replaced the 12/70's wire wheels, and have larger tyres.

The top speed is around 74 mph (119 km/h), and acceleration from 0 to 60 mph (97 km/h) in 22.2 seconds.

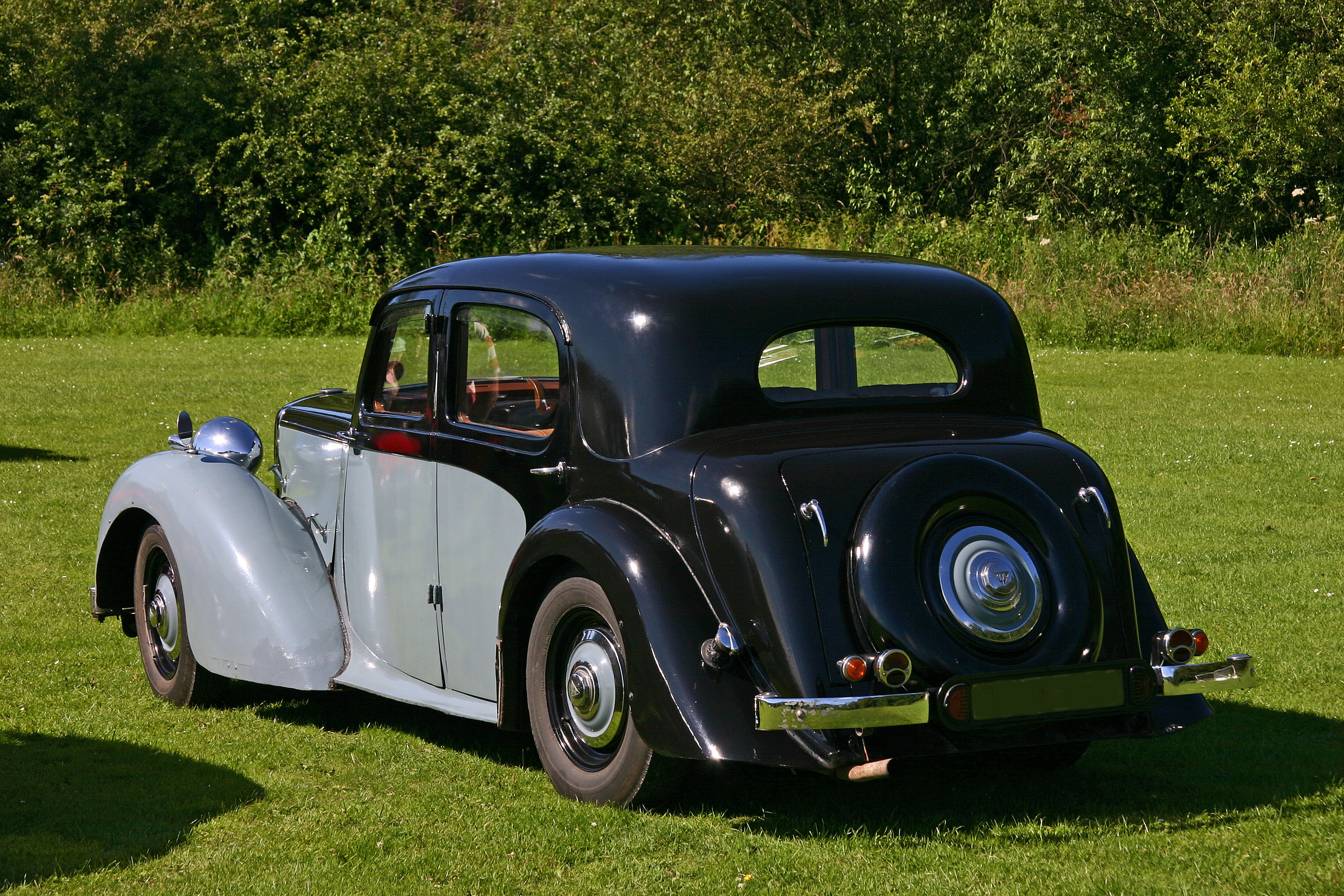
Standard sports saloon

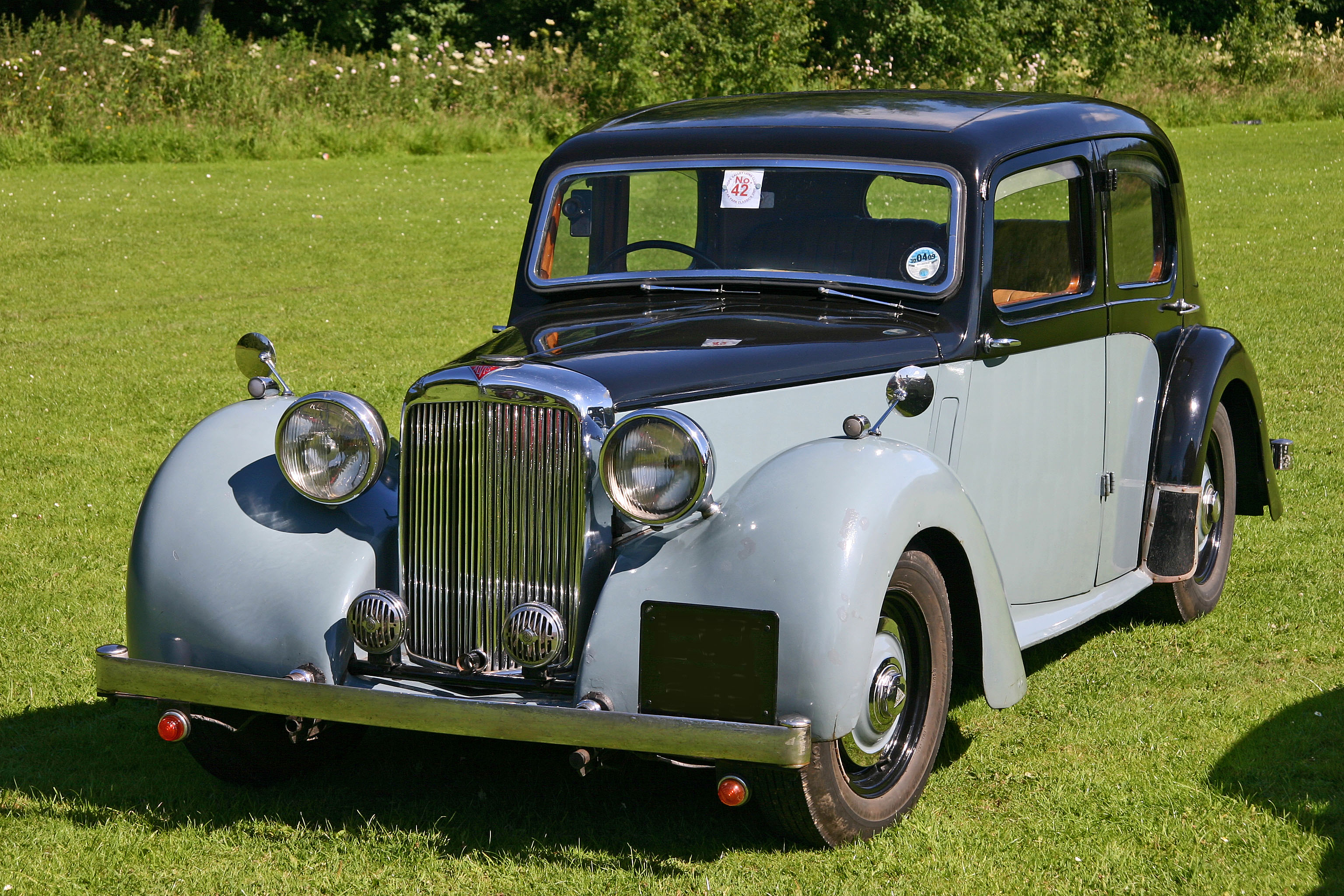
Standard sports saloon

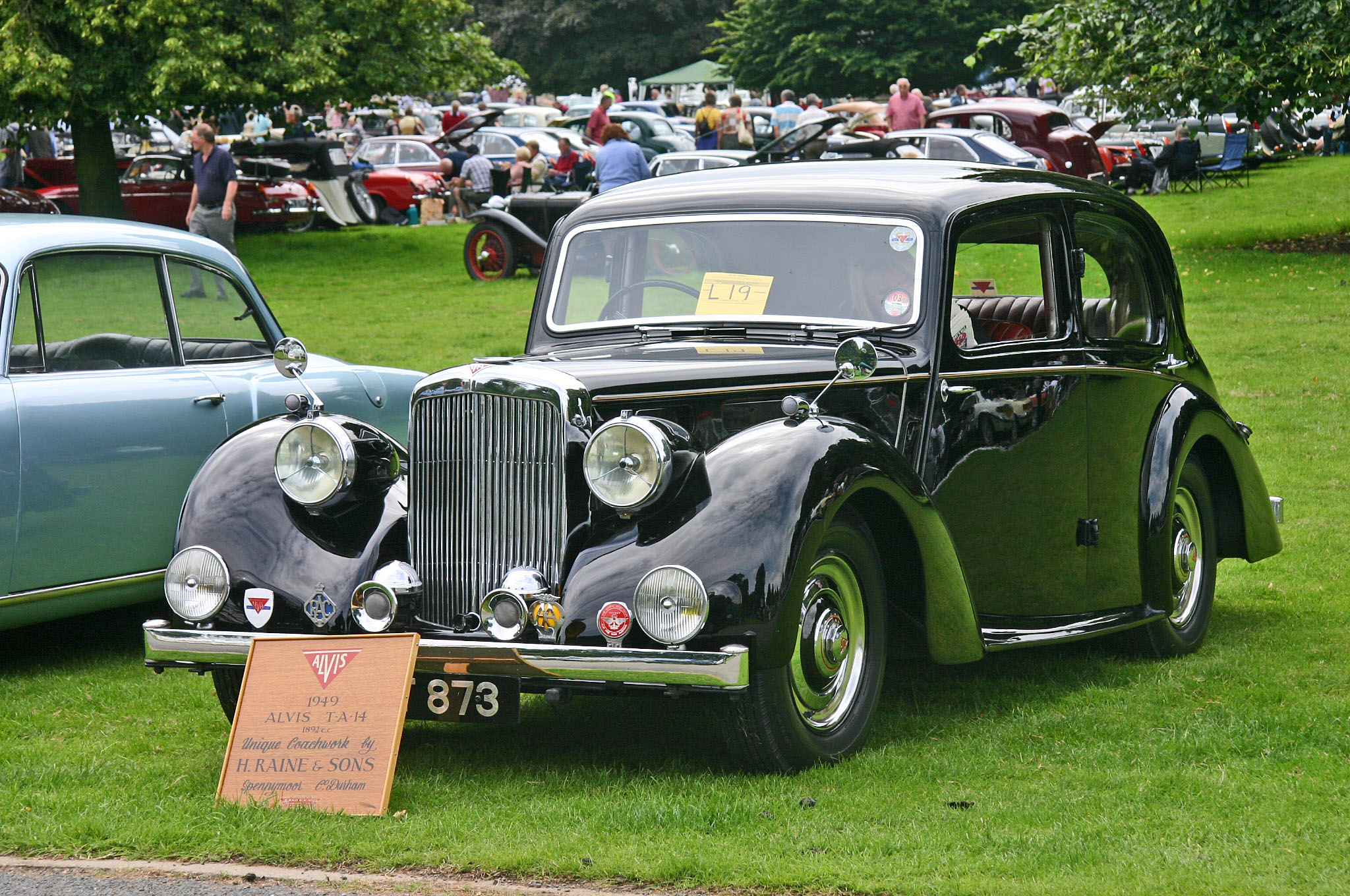
Sports saloon
by Raine of Durham

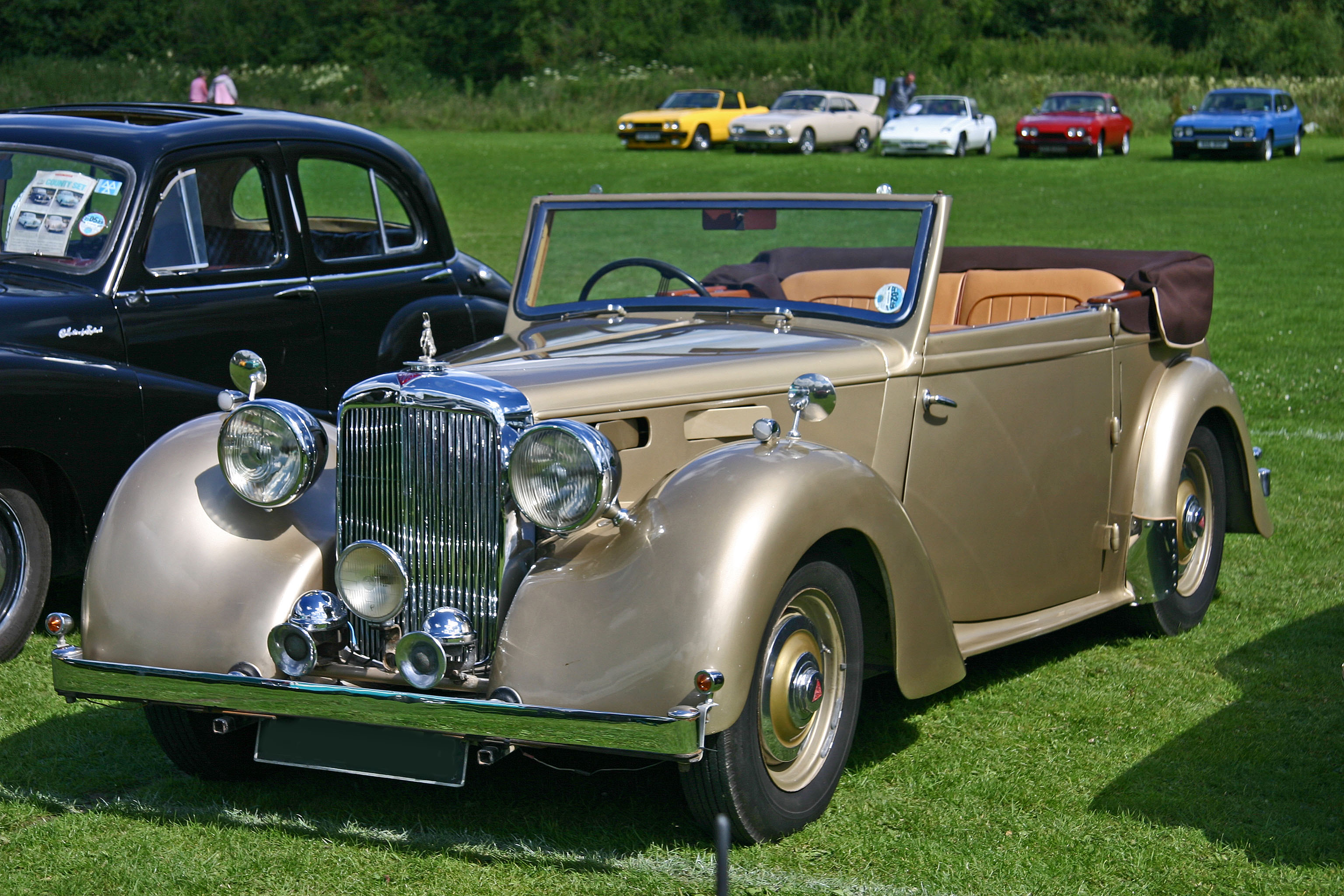
drophead coupé
by Tickford

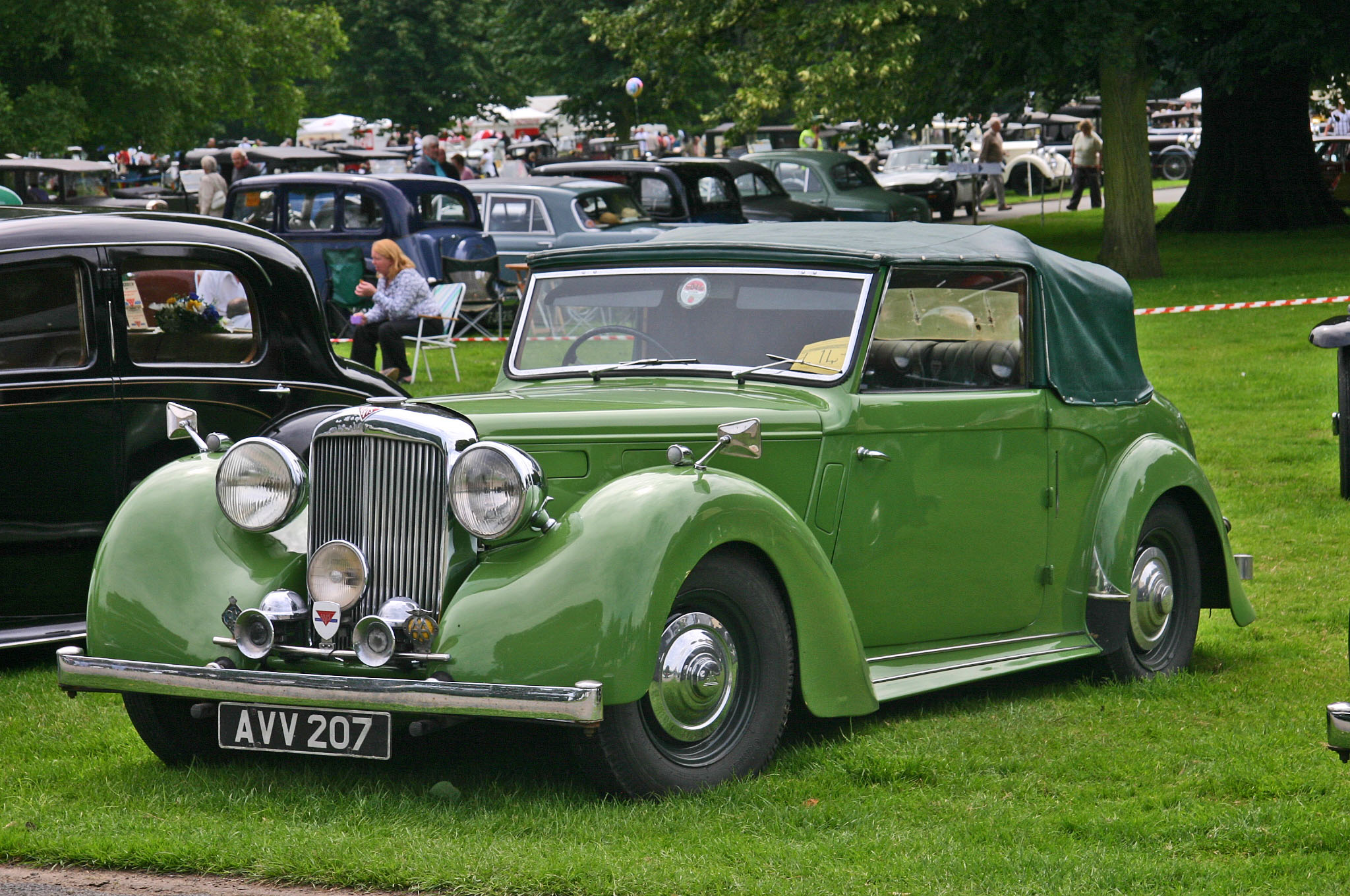
drophead coupé
by Carbodies

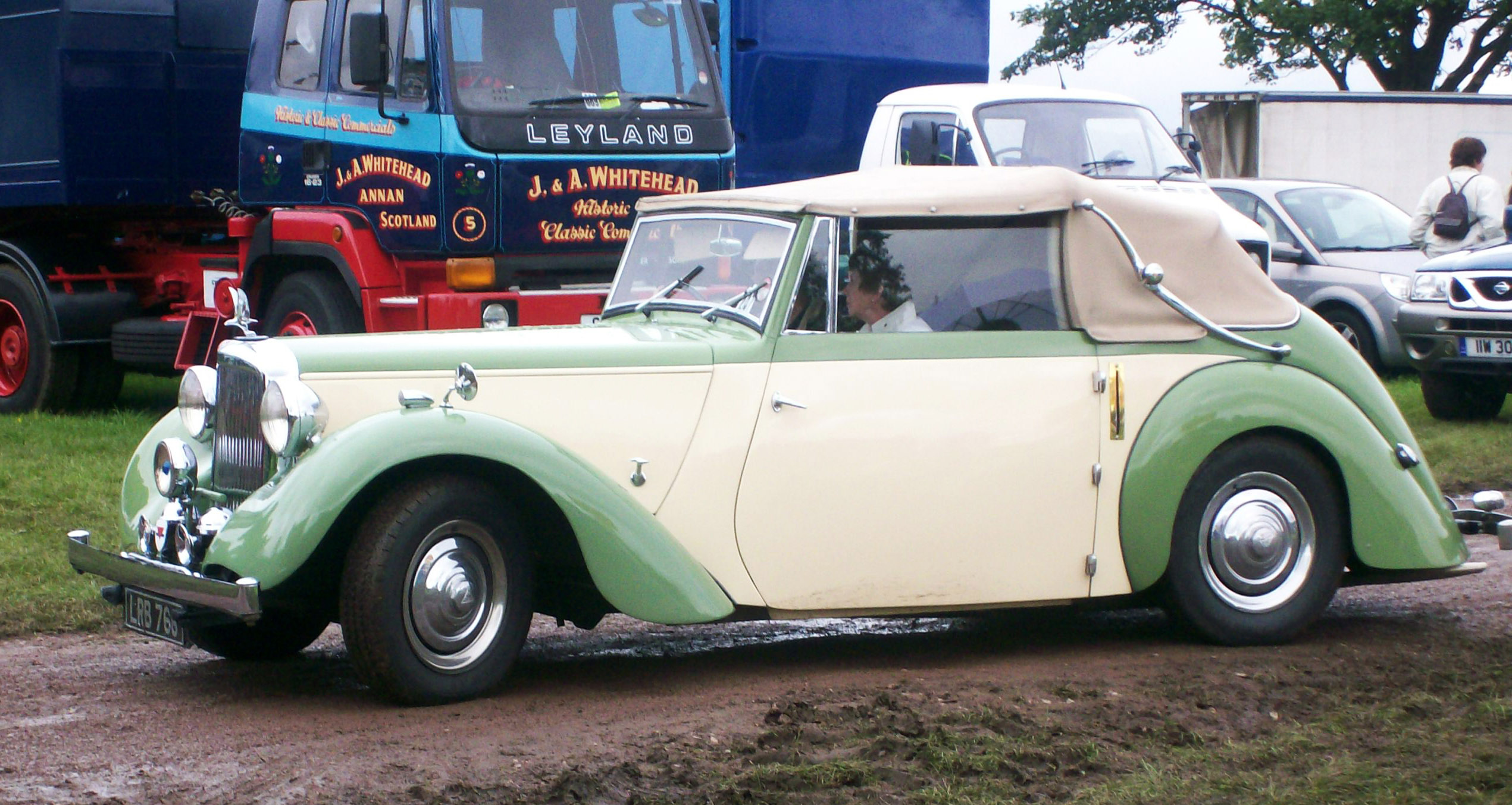
drophead coupé cabriolet
by Mead

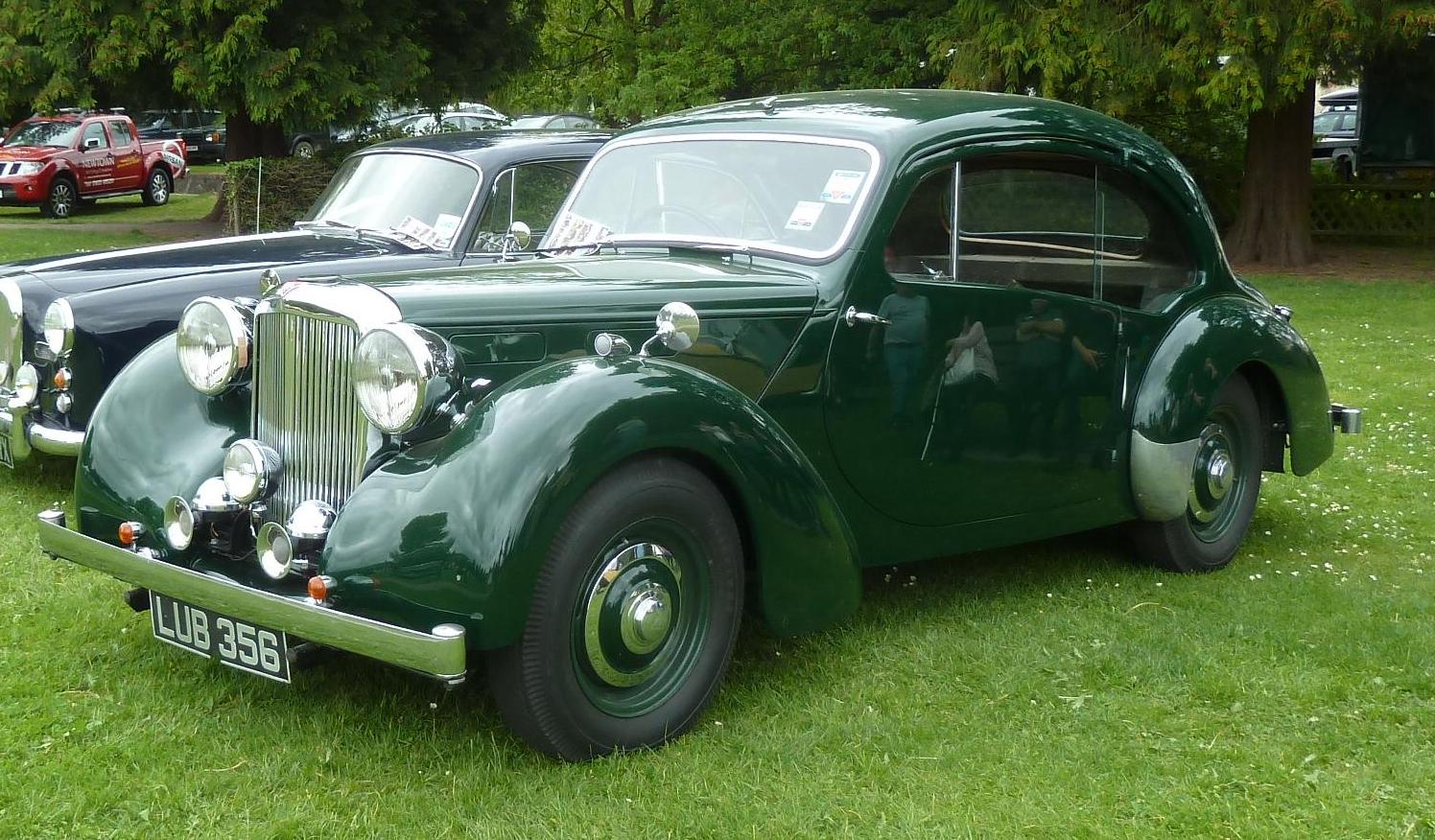
fixed head coupé by Duncan Industries 1947

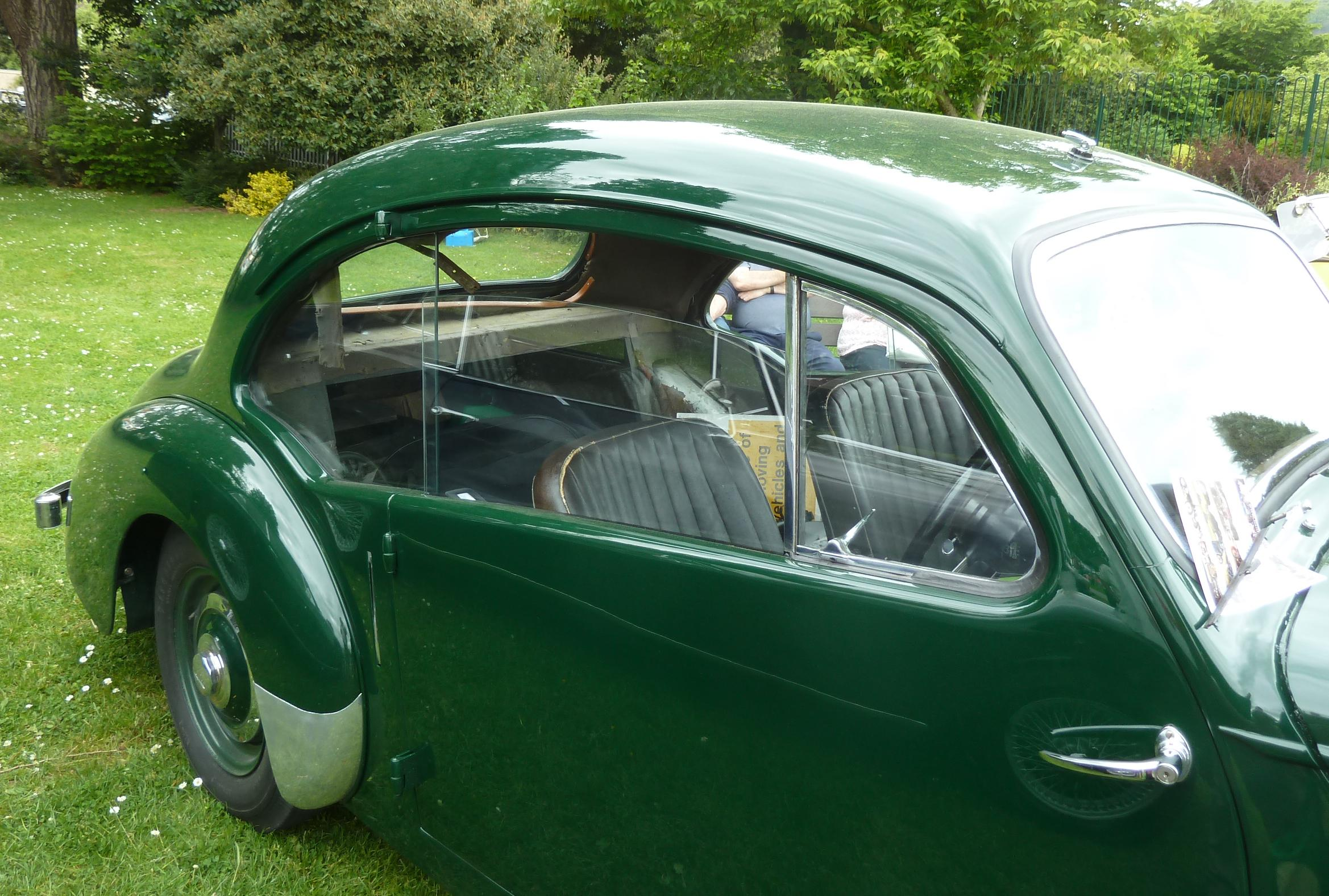

== Road test ==
Autocar reported that the new car had the typical Alvis refined, sure-footed, and lively performance. Its synchromesh "worked like a charm". The Motor said the car was much roomier than the compact close-coupled exterior suggested. Rear seat knee-room was between 8 and 13 inches. A most impressive car with a flexible 4-cylinder engine. Wind noise was noticeable at high speed.
