= Alvis Silver Crest =

Alvis Silver Crest TF and TH
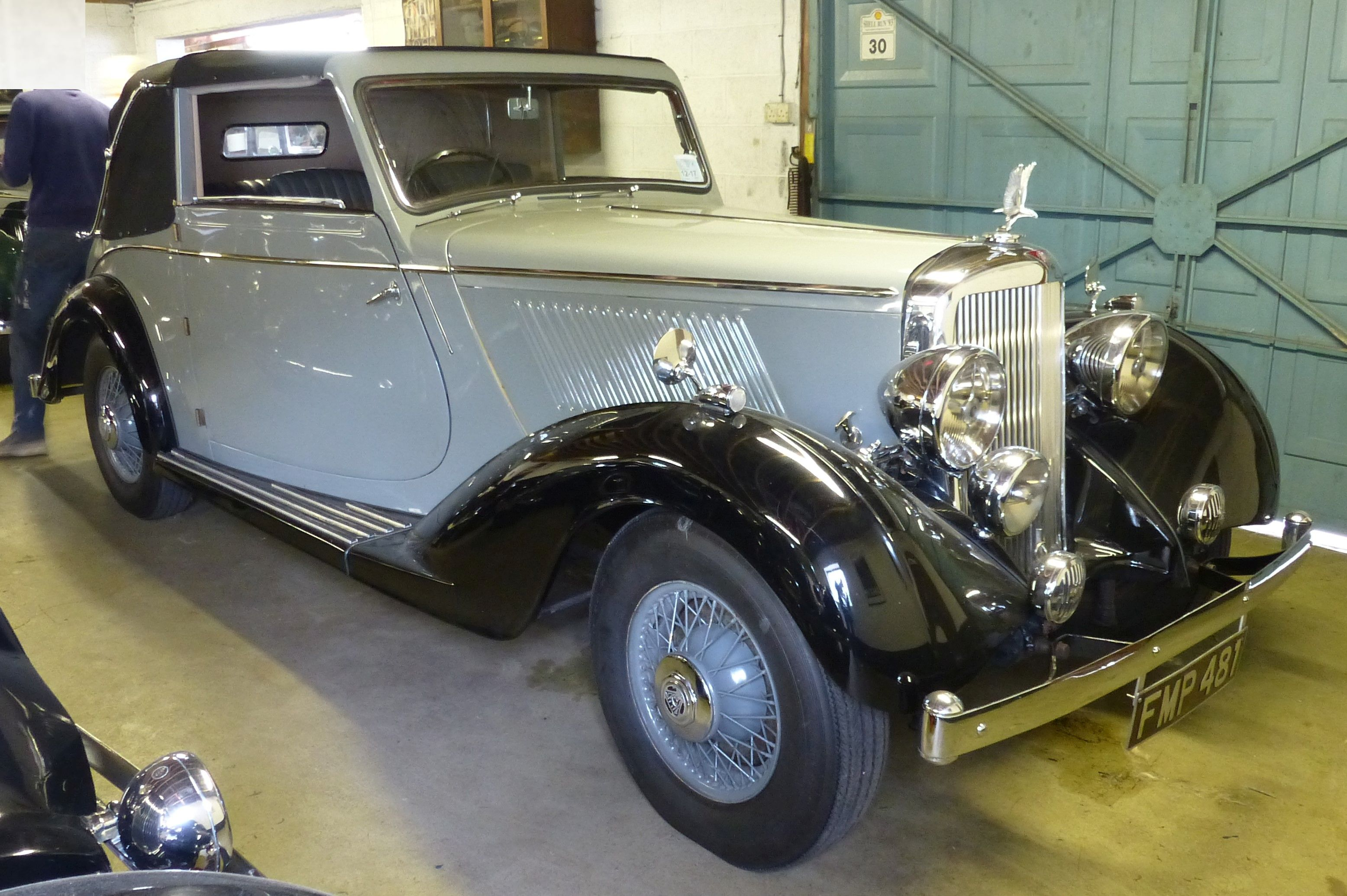
- 1937 Silver Crest 16.9 HP with drop head foursome two-door cabriolet body by Cross and Ellis

Overview
- Manufacturer: Alvis Limited, Holyhead Road, Coventry
- Production: 1937-1940

Body and chassis
- Body style: sports saloon; six-light saloon; drophead foursome coupé; chassis available for special bodies
- Layout: FR

Powertrain
- Engine: 2362 or 2762 cc Straight-6
- Transmission: single plate clutch, constant mesh gearbox with silent gears on all four forward ratios and full synchromesh, large diameter tubular cardan shaft, full floating rear axle

Dimensions
- Wheelbase: 120 in (3,048 mm); Track 56 in (1,422 mm)
- Length: 184 in (4,674 mm)
- Width: 69.5 in (1,765 mm)
- Kerb weight: 20 hp Saloon 34 cwt, 3,808 lb (1,727 kg)

Alvis 16.95 hp and 20 hp

Overview
- Manufacturer: Alvis

Layout
- Configuration: Straight 6-cylinder
- Displacement: 16.95 2,362 cc (144.1 cu in); 20.00 2,762 cc (168.5 cu in)
- Cylinder bore: 16.95 67.5 mm (2.66 in); 20.00 67.5 mm (2.66 in)
- Piston stroke: 110 mm (4.33 in)
- Cylinder block material: monobloc casting, 4 bearing crankshaft with vibration damper, alloy pistons
- Cylinder head material: detachable
- Valvetrain: valves in head operated by pushrods, nine valve springs per valve, drive from crankshaft by special Triplex chain
- Compression ratio: 6.2:1 6.48:1

Combustion
- Fuel system: triple S.U. carburettors air cleaners and silencers, synchronised, twin electric petrol pumps from tank at rear. Single pump on smaller engine
- Oil system: rotary gear pump providing pressure feed to crankshaft main and big end bearings
- Cooling system: water pump, belt-driven fan

Output
- Power output: 16.95 68 bhp (51 kW; 69 PS) @4,200 rpm; 20 95 bhp (71 kW; 96 PS) @4,000 rpm; Tax horsepower 16.95 or 19.82

Alvis Silver Crest is a 4 or 5 passenger saloon car or coupé produced by the Alvis Car and Engineering Company between 1937 and 1940. It used advanced technology intended to provide a top speed in excess of 80 miles per hour (129 km/h) and sold at a relatively high purchase price. Announced in mid-August 1937, production ended just before the war when a new-shaped body entered production.

== Engine ==
Six-cylinders, water-cooled, either 2.4 or 2.8-litres using a four-bearing crankshaft and a vibration damper. Camshaft and auxiliaries are driven from the crankshaft by Triplex chain. Synchronised triple S.U. carburettors feed in petrol from twin fuel pumps from a 16-gallon tank at the back of the car.

== Body ==
The 4/5 seater body has two large separate adjustable leather seats at the front and two further seats are provided at the back. The car's instrument panel includes speedometer, clock, gauges showing oil pressure, petrol, thermometer, ignition lamp, ammeter, ignition switch, start control and connection for an inspection lamp.

== Chassis steering brakes and suspension ==
A new designed chassis with straight box section sidemembers having six tubular cross-members is particularly stiff so the independent front suspension can work properly. Steering is carried out by worm and nut. Automatic chassis lubrication is controlled by the clutch pedal. The car is fitted with a Smith's hydraulic jacking system. The independent front suspension to Alvis's own design is by transverse leaf springs. The semi-elliptic rear springs are underslung. Luvax hydraulic shock absorbers control the springing. A fully floating rear axle is fitted. Wire wheels with bolt-on hubs are supplied fitted with extra low-pressure tyres. Four-wheel, self-energising Girling brakes have large diameter drums which are ribbed for cooling.

== Chassis only ==
When bought as a chassis for a bespoke body the chassis package includes lighting and starting sets, twin electric windscreen wipers, all instrument panel fittings, bonnet, front wings and running boards, battery, twin horns, front bumper, all tyres, foot pump and tool kit.

== Road test ==
The motoring correspondent of The Times published his experiences with the smaller engined sports saloon car in August 1937 soon after its announcement. The handsome body he said offers room for five and really comfortable seating. A driver can climb in and out of the car by the near side without too much difficulty. The luggage compartment contained toolboxes which might have been better stowed below at each side of the spare wheel to avoid being obliged to use the door of the boot as a luggage platform. It is delightful to handle, the full-synchromesh gearbox was everything it should be. The steering on the extra-low-pressure tyres was a shade heavy, brakes were powerful. The car's front was always firm and there was no needless pitch and toss.

He also reported that this smaller-engined car was not run in but easily ran up to 70 miles an hour.
