= Rover (marque) =

British car brand

- Rover logo from 2003
- Current owner: Jaguar Land Rover (since 2013)
- Country: United Kingdom
- Introduced: 1878; 148 years ago
- Discontinued: 15 April 2005; 21 years ago
- Markets: Automotive
- Previous owners: Rover Company (1878–1967); Leyland Motors (1967–1968); British Leyland (1968–1986); Rover Group (1986–2000); BMW (2000–2006); licensed to MG Rover (2000–2005); Land Rover (2006–2013)

Rover is a British automotive brand that was used for over a century, from 1904 to 2005. It was launched as a bicycle maker called Rover Company in 1878, before starting to manufacture autocars in 1904. The marque used the Viking longship as its logo. The rights to the trademark are currently held by Jaguar Land Rover, which continues to produce Land Rovers, but no Rover automobiles are currently in production and the brand is considered dormant.

Despite being first absorbed by the Leyland Motor Corporation (LMC) in 1966 and a subsequent succession of mergers, nationalisation, and demergers, the Rover marque retained its identity – first as an independent subsidiary division of LMC, and subsequently through various groups within British Leyland (BL) through the 1970s and into the 1980s.

== History ==
The Rover brand then became the flagship marque of the newly and eponymously renamed Rover Group in 1988, which included the actually stronger and more valuable trademarks Land Rover and Mini as it passed first through the hands of British Aerospace and then into the ownership of BMW Group. Sharing technology with Honda and financial investment during the BMW ownership led to a revival of the brand during the 1990s in its core midsize car segment.

In 2000, BMW sold Rover and related MG car activities of the Rover Group to the Phoenix Consortium, who established the MG Rover Group at Longbridge. BMW retained ownership of the Rover trademark, allowing MG Rover to use it under licence. In April 2005, Rover-badged cars ceased to be produced when the MG Rover Group became insolvent. The MG Rover Group's assets then got split up between two Chinese automakers – some were bought by SAIC Motor, who obtained technology that was incorporated into a new Chinese line of Roewe-badged luxury saloons. Other assets were bought by Nanjing Automobile, which subsequently became a subsidiary of SAIC Motor in 2007.

BMW sold the rights to the Rover trademark to Ford in 2006 for approximately £6 million, the latter exercising an option of first refusal to buy it dating back to its purchase of Land Rover in 2000. Ford thus reunited the original Rover Company marques, primarily for brand-protection reasons. In March 2008, Ford reached agreement with Tata Motors of India to include the Rover trademark as part of the sale of their Jaguar Land Rover operations to them. Legally the Rover brand is the property of Land Rover under the terms of Ford's purchase of the name in 2006.

== Ownership ==
=== British Leyland ===
In 1970, Rover combined its skill in producing comfortable saloons and the rugged Land Rover 4x4 to produce the Range Rover, one of the first vehicles (preceded by the Jeep Wagoneer and International Scout) to combine off-road ability and comfortable versatility. Powered by the licence-built ex-Buick V8 engine, it had innovative features such as a permanent four-wheel drive system, all-coil spring suspension, and disc brakes on all wheels. Able to reach speeds of up to 100 mph (160 km/h) yet also capable of extreme off-road use, the original Range Rover design remained in production for the next 26 years.

The company's other major project at this time was the P8, a successor, styled by David Bache, for the 3-litre. The car's shape owed much to Detroit, with a front bumper concealed under a "bumperless" polyurethane nose, in a manner reminiscent of contemporary Pontiacs, and a side profile reminiscent of a slightly chunkier Opel Rekord. Although the original brief was for the car to be no longer externally than a Rover 2000, management changes led the project to be redefined as it progressed, and the P8 scheduled for launch at the 1971 London Motor Show was substantially larger than any existing Rover sedan, with the Rover V8 engine expanded for this application to 4.4 litres. The car followed the P6 in employing a steel frame structure with bolt-on steel or aluminium panels. The manufacturer was nevertheless short of cash and focus at this time: the P8 was one of several new model projects subjected to a slipping time-line. By the revised launch date towards the end of 1972 the considerable development costs had been expended and pre-production prototypes had even undergone extensive testing in Finland. Production capacity had been set aside for the P8 at the Solihull plant. However, an expenditure review in 1970 found the project subjected to criticism from Sir William Lyons, by now an influential member of the British Leyland board: speculation has arisen that Lyons saw the car as a threat to future investment in the recently launched Jaguar XJ6. It later emerged that Rover's contender would not have been particularly cheap or easy to build, and the shrinkage of the European market for sedans of this size that followed the 1973 oil price shock suggest that abandonment of the project in 1972 – even at the eleventh hour – may have been the right decision for British Leyland; but the P8 was not entirely ummourned nearly thirty years later. Some of the P8's styling cues turned up two years later on the Leyland P76, and the driver's view of the instrument panel (albeit without the Austin Allegro style "quartic" steering wheel that appears in one of the surviving pictures of it) would have been not entirely unfamiliar to the driver of a 1976 Rover 3500.

As British Leyland struggled through financial turmoil and an industrial-relations crisis during the 1970s, it was effectively nationalised after a multibillion-pound government cash injection in 1975. Michael Edwardes was brought in to head the company.

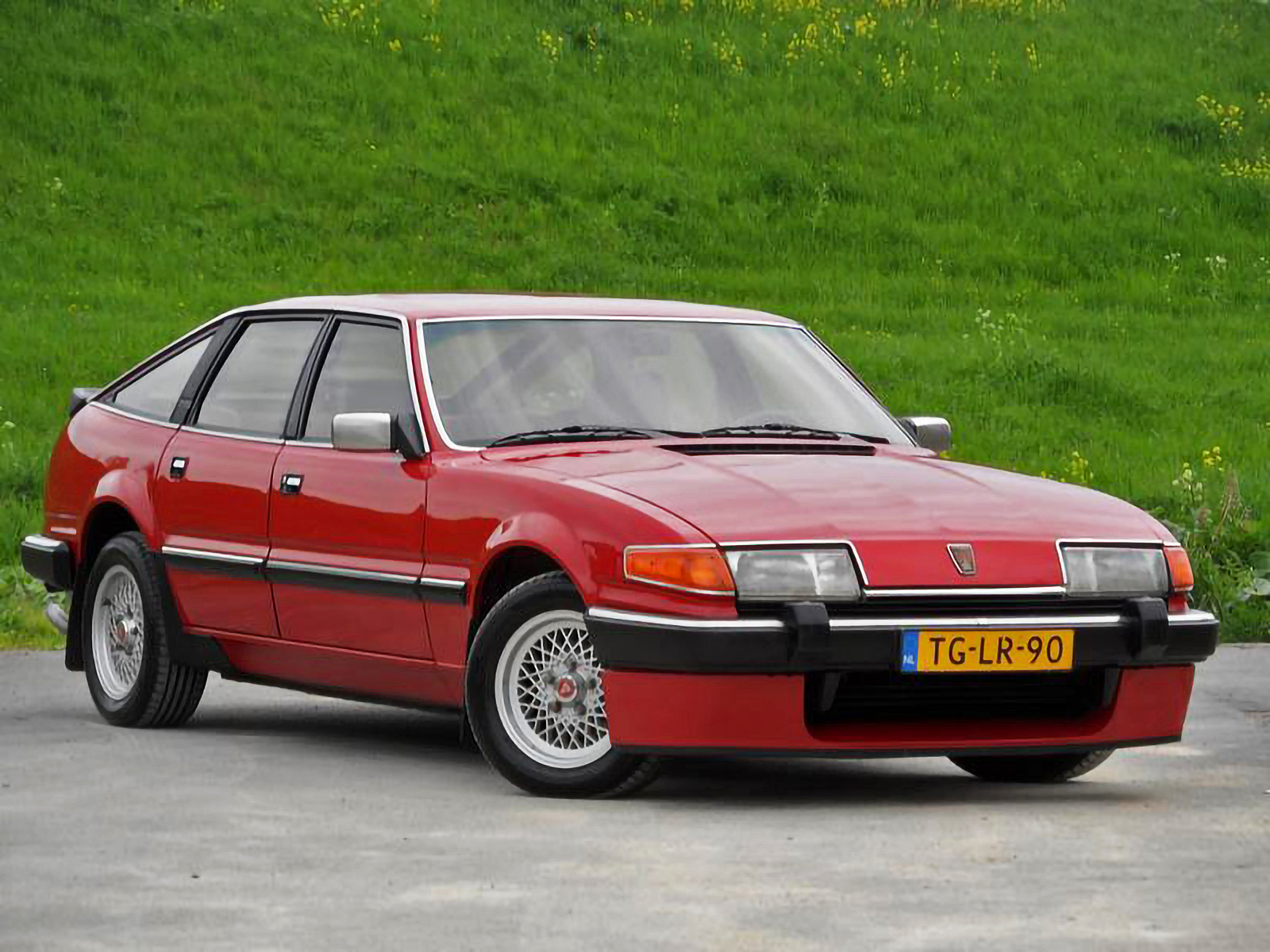
1985 Rover Vitesse (SD1) (post-facelift)

The Rover SD1 of 1976, upon launch, was beset with many build quality and reliability issues. Following the closure of the Triumph factory at Canley, production of the TR7 and TR8 was moved to Solihull; soon after, a savage programme of cutbacks in the late 1970s led to the end of car production at Solihull, which was turned over for Land Rover production only. The TR7/TR8 was discontinued while SD1 production moved to Cowley. All future Rover cars would be made in the former Austin and Morris plants in Longbridge and Cowley, respectively.

In 1979, British Leyland (or as it was now officially known, BL Ltd.) began a long relationship with the Honda Motor Company of Japan. The result was a cross-holding structure, where Honda took a 20% stake in the company while the company took a 20% stake in Honda's UK subsidiary. The deal was thought to be mutually beneficial: Honda used its British operations as a launchpad into Europe, and the company could pool resources with Honda in developing new cars.

Austin Rover Group was formed in 1982 as the mass-market car manufacturing subsidiary of BL, with the separate Rover Company becoming effectively defunct.

In the 1980s, the slimmed-down BL used the Rover brand on a range of cars codeveloped with Honda. The first Honda-sourced Rover model, released in 1984, was the Rover 200, which, like the Triumph Acclaim that it replaced, was based on the Honda Ballade. Similarly, in Australia, the Honda Quint (known in Europe as the Quintet) and Integra were badged as the Rover Quintet and 416i.

=== Rover Group ===
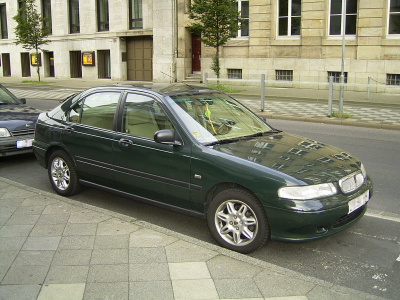
1996 Rover 400

By 1988, Austin Rover had moved to a one-marque strategy, using only the Rover brand. Its parent, BL, was renamed as the Rover Group, with the car division becoming Rover Cars.

In 1986, the Rover SD1 was replaced by the Rover 800, developed with the Honda Legend. The Austin range were now technically Rovers, though the word "Rover" never actually appeared on the badging. Instead, there was a badge similar to the Rover Viking shape, without wording. The Metro was officially badged as a Rover when the restyled version was launched in May 1990. The second generation Rover 200, based on Honda's Concerto, was launched in October 1989, but now featured a hatchback instead of a four-door saloon, the bodystyle which would feature on the Rover 400 (visually similar and based on the same underpinnings) from its launch in April 1990. The larger Rover 600, launched in April 1993, was based on the Accord and used various Honda and Rover engines and was aimed further upmarket at the likes of the BMW 3 Series rather than the likes of the Ford Mondeo which the Honda Accord was marketed to compete with.

Rover exported Rover 800s, branded as Sterlings, to the United States from 1987 to 1991.

==== British Aerospace ownership ====
In 1988, the Rover brand went back into private hands when the Rover Group was acquired by British Aerospace.

==== BMW ownership ====
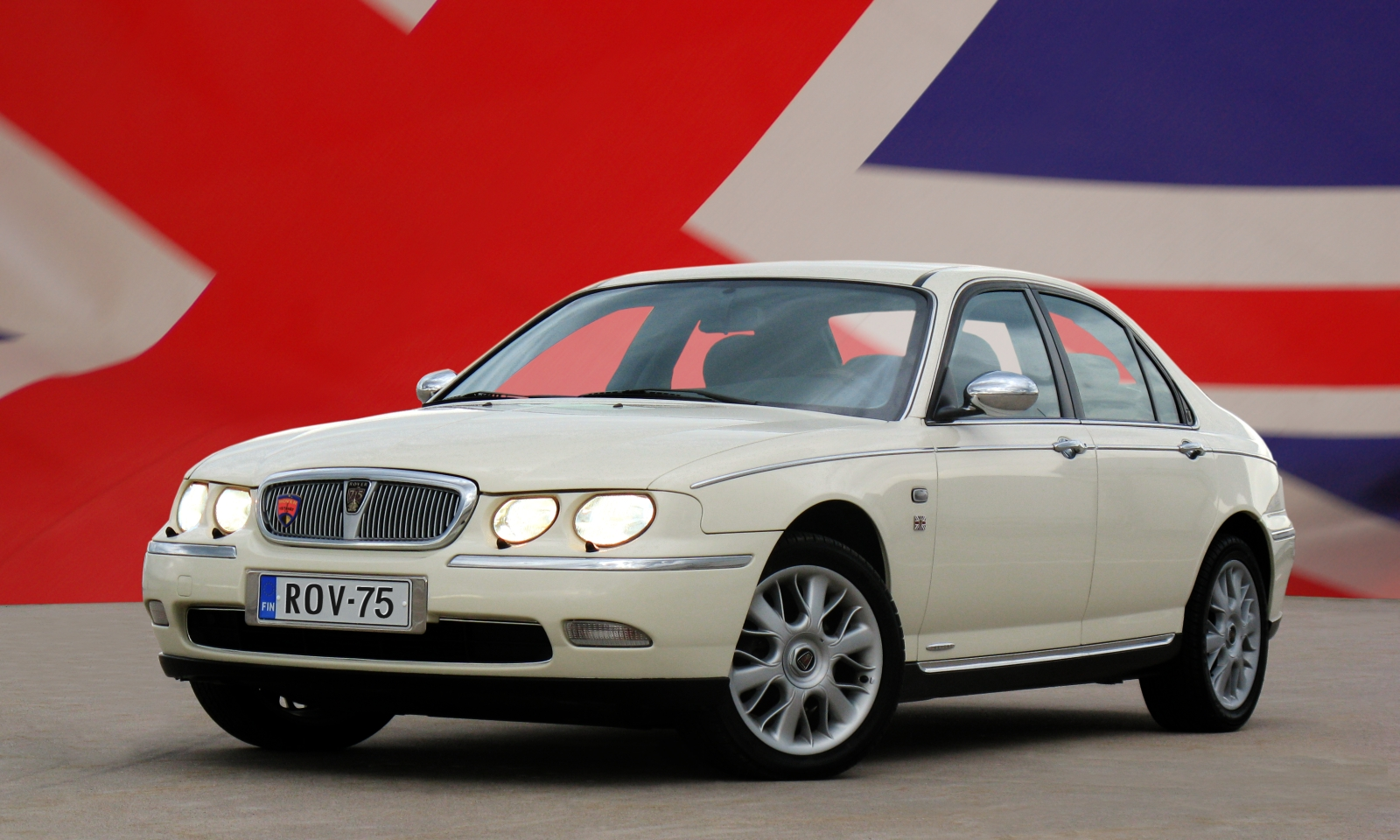
Rover 75, launched in 1999

The Honda partnership proved to be the turnaround point for the company, steadily rebuilding its image to the point where once again, Rover-branded cars were seen as upmarket alternatives to Fords and Vauxhalls. In 1994, British Aerospace sold the Rover Group, including the Rover, Land Rover, Riley, Mini, Triumph, and Austin-Healey brands to BMW, who had begun to see Rover-branded cars as potential major competitors.

Under BMW, the Rover Group developed the Rover 75 and was launched in June 1999, as a retro-designed car influenced by the earlier Rover P4 and P5 designs. It proved to be a success for the brand, gaining positive critics, although it failed to outsell the BMW 3 Series.

In May 2000, BMW split up the Rover Group, selling Land Rover to the Ford Motor Company for an estimated sum of £1.8-billion, retaining the MINI brand and selling the rest of the car business to the Phoenix Consortium, who established it as MG Rover. Although BMW included ownership of the MG brand in the deal, they retained ownership of the Rover brand, licensing its use to the new MG Rover company for use on the ongoing car models that they had acquired.

===== MG Rover licensees =====
A specially assembled group of businessmen, known as the Phoenix Consortium and headed by ex-Rover chief executive John Towers, established the MG Rover Group from the former Rover Group car operations (acquired from BMW for a nominal £10 in May 2000) and continued to use the Rover brand under licence from BMW.

In 1999, the Rover Group had sustained losses of an estimated £800 million – largely due to the declining sales of its existing 200 and 400 family cars and initially slow sales of the Rover 75. The four businessmen who took control of the newly formed MG Rover Group are reported to have received around £430-million in a dowry from BMW that included unsold stock.

The first new Rover-branded car to be launched after the formation of MG Rover was the estate version of the Rover 75, which went on sale in July 2001. In October 2003, MG Rover launched the CityRover, a badge-engineered Tata Indica that served as an entry-level model. Despite high initial expectations, sales were poor and it received mainly negative critics. Several concept cars intended to point the way towards a replacement for the Rover 25 and 45 were shown in the early 2000s, but no production model emerged.

MG Rover production ceased on 15 April 2005, when it was declared insolvent, resulting in the immediate loss of more than 6,000 jobs at the company. On 22 July 2005, the physical assets of the collapsed firm were sold to the Nanjing Automobile Group for £53m. They indicated that their preliminary plans involved relocating the Powertrain engine plant to China while splitting car production into Rover lines in China and resumed MG lines in the West Midlands (though not necessarily at Longbridge), where a UK R&D and technical facility would also be developed.

On 30 May 2007, Nanjing Automobile Group claimed to have restarted production of MG TF sports cars in the Longbridge plant, with sales expected to begin in the autumn.

Shanghai Automotive Industry Corporation (SAIC), who held the intellectual property of Rover 75 car design (bought for £67m before MG Rover collapsed) and was also bidding for MG Rover, announced their own version of the Rover 75 in late 2006. In July 2006, SAIC announced their intent to buy the Rover brand name from BMW, who still owned the rights to the Rover brand. However, BMW refused their request, due to an agreement that Ford had reached with them to be given first option on the brand when it acquired Land Rover. Unable to use the Rover name, SAIC created their own brand with a similar name and badge, known as Roewe. Roewe was eventually launched in early 2007.

=== Land Rover ===
Ford purchased the Land Rover company from BMW in 2000, and the deal included the option to purchase the Rover brand name if MG Rover ceased trading. This right was exercised on 18 September 2006 and effectively meant the brand was transferred to Land Rover.

=== Jaguar Land Rover ===
Ford sold their Jaguar and Land Rover operations to Tata Motors in 2008, along with the rights to the Rover brand. In 2013, the operations of Jaguar Cars and Land Rover were merged into the single car manufacturing company Jaguar Land Rover along with the rights to the Rover brand.

== Models ==
=== Launched by Rover Company (1904–1967) ===
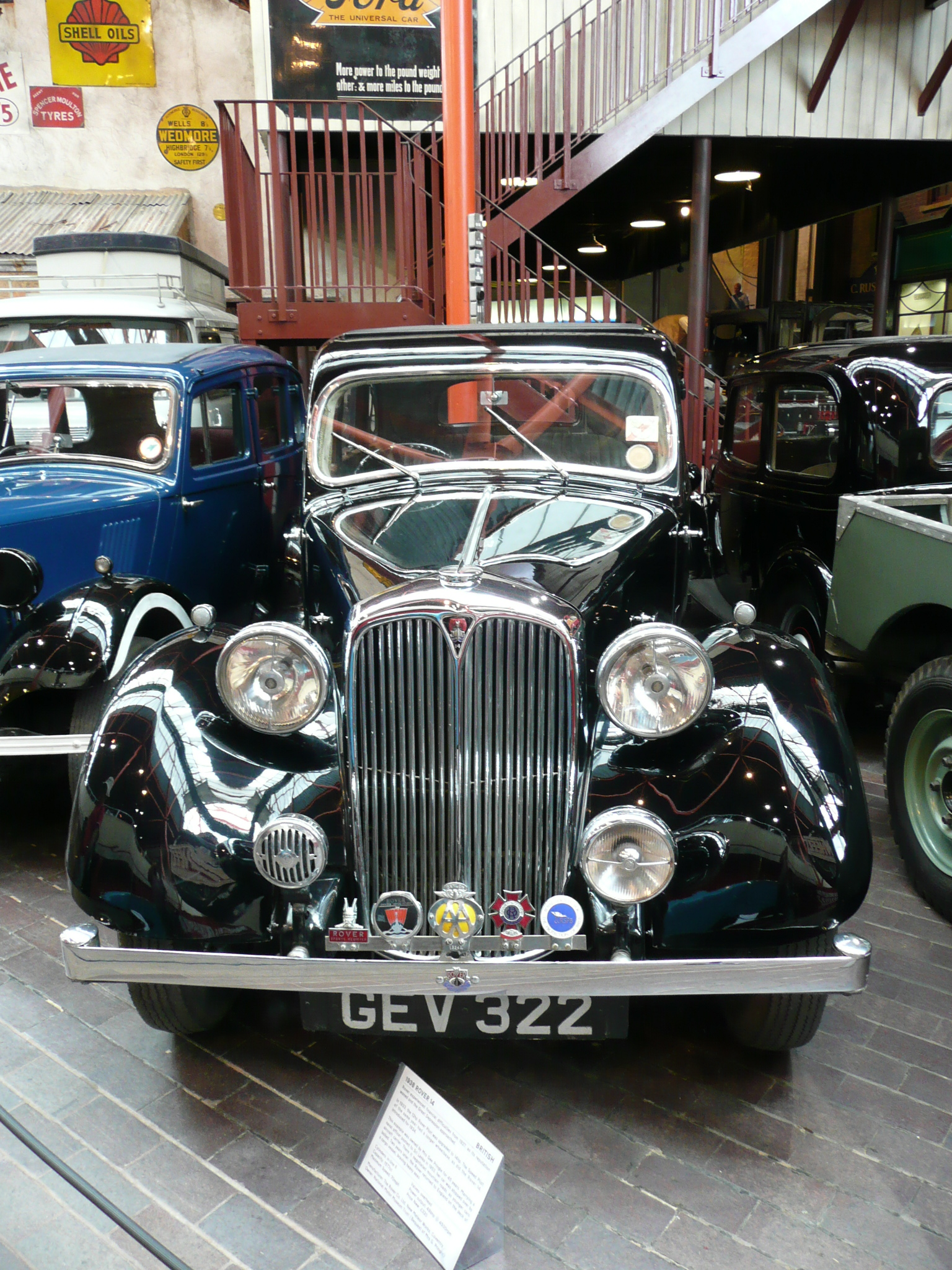
1938 Rover 14

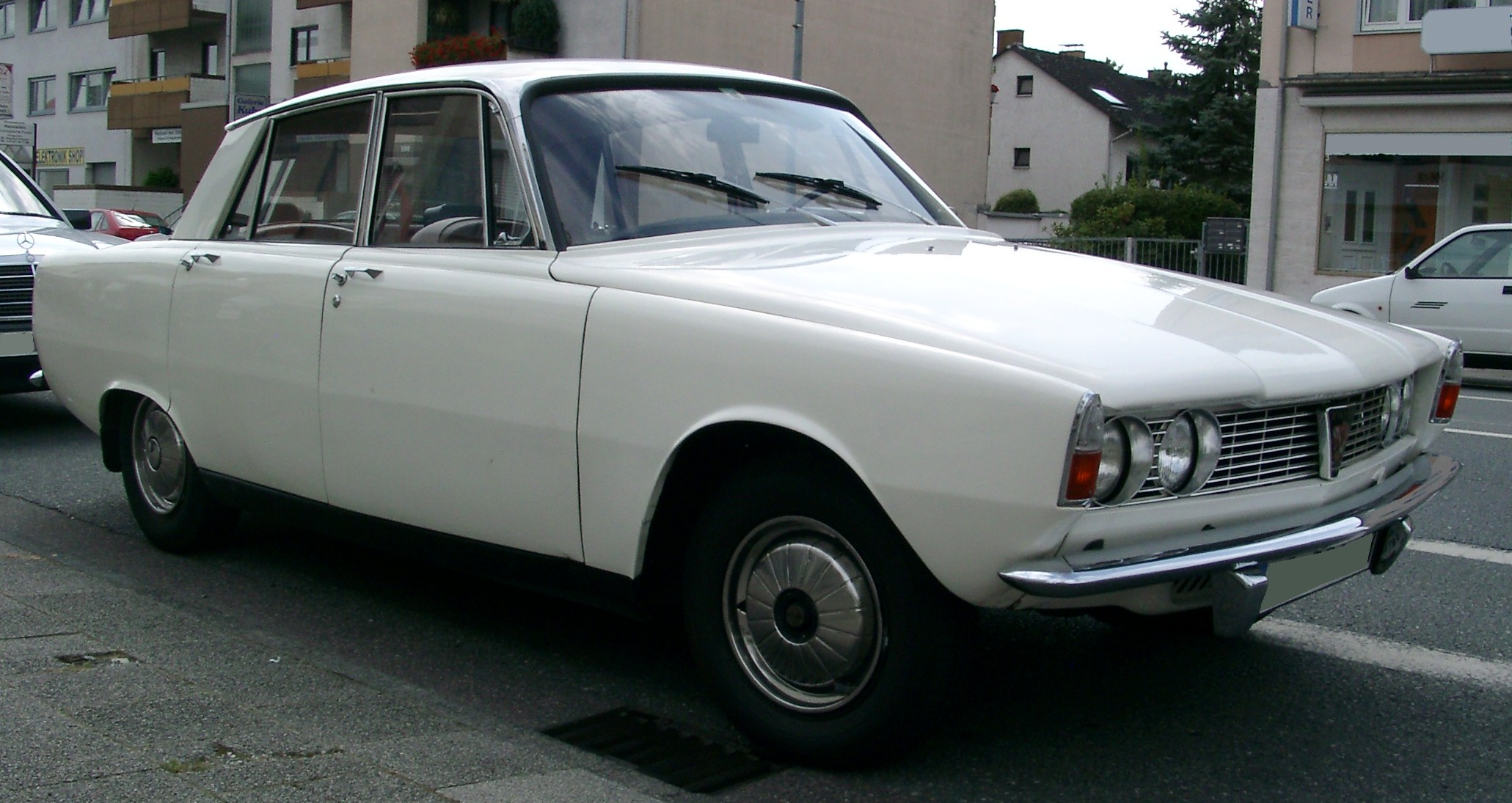
1966 Rover P6

- 1904–1912 Rover 8
- 1906–1910 Rover 6
- 1906–1910 Rover 16/20
- 1912–1923 Rover 12
- 1919–1925 Rover 8
- 1924–1927 Rover 9/20
- 1925–1927 Rover 14/45
- 1927–1932 Rover Light Six
- 1927–1947 Rover 10
- 1929–1932 Rover 2-Litre
- 1930–1934 Rover Meteor 16HP/20HP
- 1931–1940 Rover Speed 20
- 1932–1933 Rover Pilot/Speed Pilot
- 1932–1932 Rover Scarab
- 1934–1947 Rover 12
- 1934–1947 Rover 14/Speed 14
- 1937–1947 Rover 16
- 1948–1978 Land Rover (I/II/III)—In 1978, BL established Land Rover Limited as a separate subsidiary; it took over Land Rover production.
- 1948–1949 Rover P3 (60/75)
- 1949–1964 Rover P4 (60/75/80/90/95/100/105/110)
- 1958–1973 Rover P5 (3-Litre/3.5-Litre)
- 1963–1977 Rover P6 (2000/2200/3500)

=== Launched by BLMC/BL (1967–1986) ===
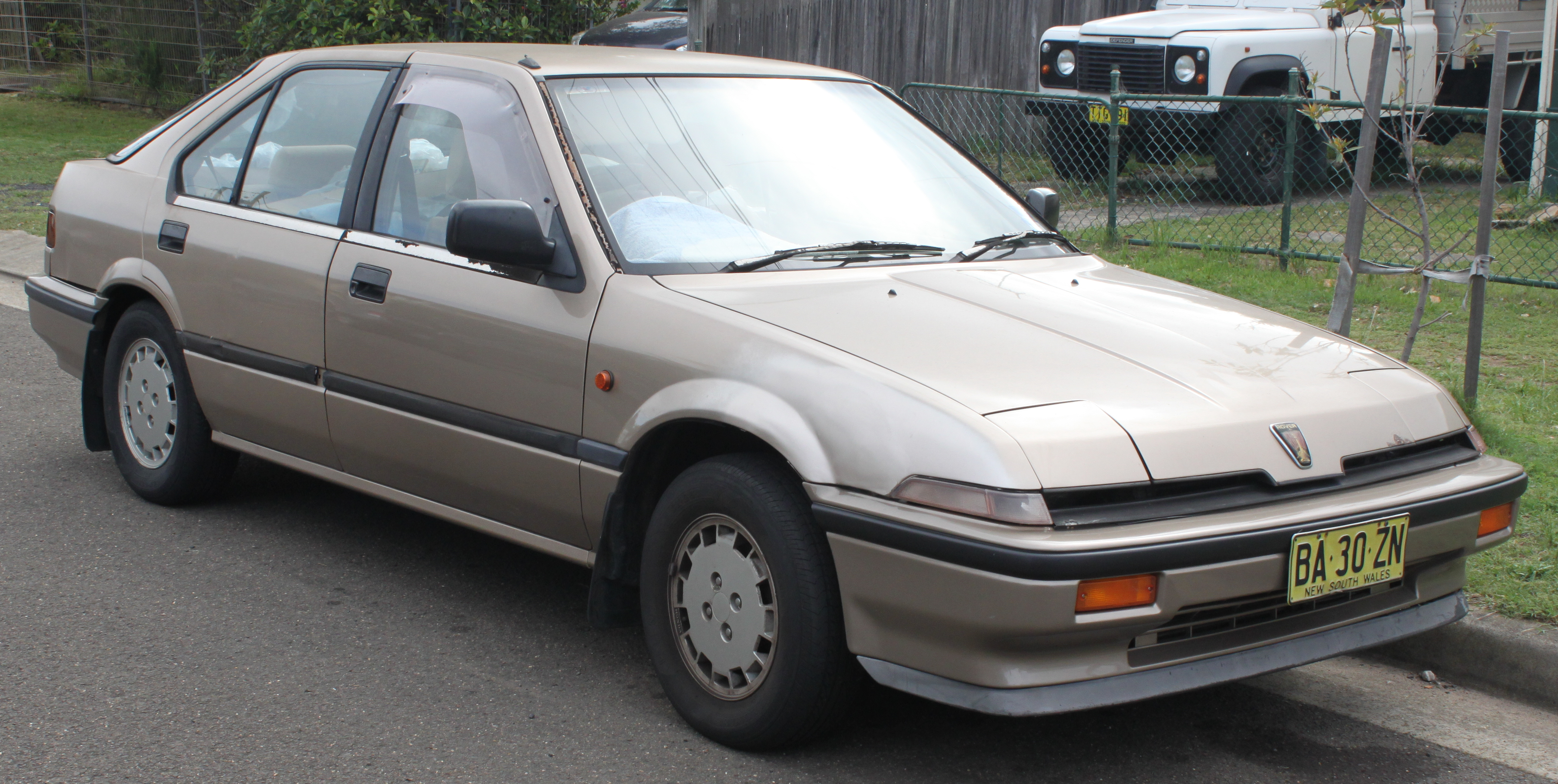
1986 Rover 416i (Australian market)

- 1970–1978 Range Rover—In 1978, BL established Land Rover Limited as a separate subsidiary; it took over Range Rover production.
- 1976–1986 Rover SD1 (2000/2300/2400/2600/3500/Vitesse)
- 1983–1985 Rover Quintet-Australian market
- 1984–1999 Rover 200 (211/213/214/216/218/220)
- 1985–1989 Rover 416i—Australian market

=== Rebrands by Rover Group (1986–2000) ===
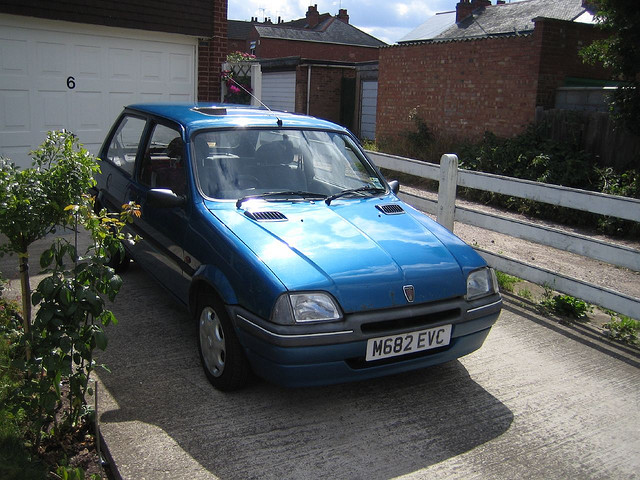
1994 Rover Metro

- Mini/Supermini cars
  - 1986–2000 Rover Mini – Originally called the Austin Seven/Morris Mini Minor in 1959, but renamed Rover Mini in 1986.
  - 1990–1998 Rover Metro, Rover 100 (111/114/115) – Originally called the Austin Metro. Rebranded as a Rover three years after Austin's fall.
- Family cars
  - 1989–1994 Maestro – Never branded a Rover, but sold through brand dealerships with a badge the same shape as the Rover badge.
  - 1989–1994 Montego – Never branded a Rover, but sold through brand dealerships with a badge the same shape as the Rover badge.

=== Launched by Rover Group (1986–2000) ===
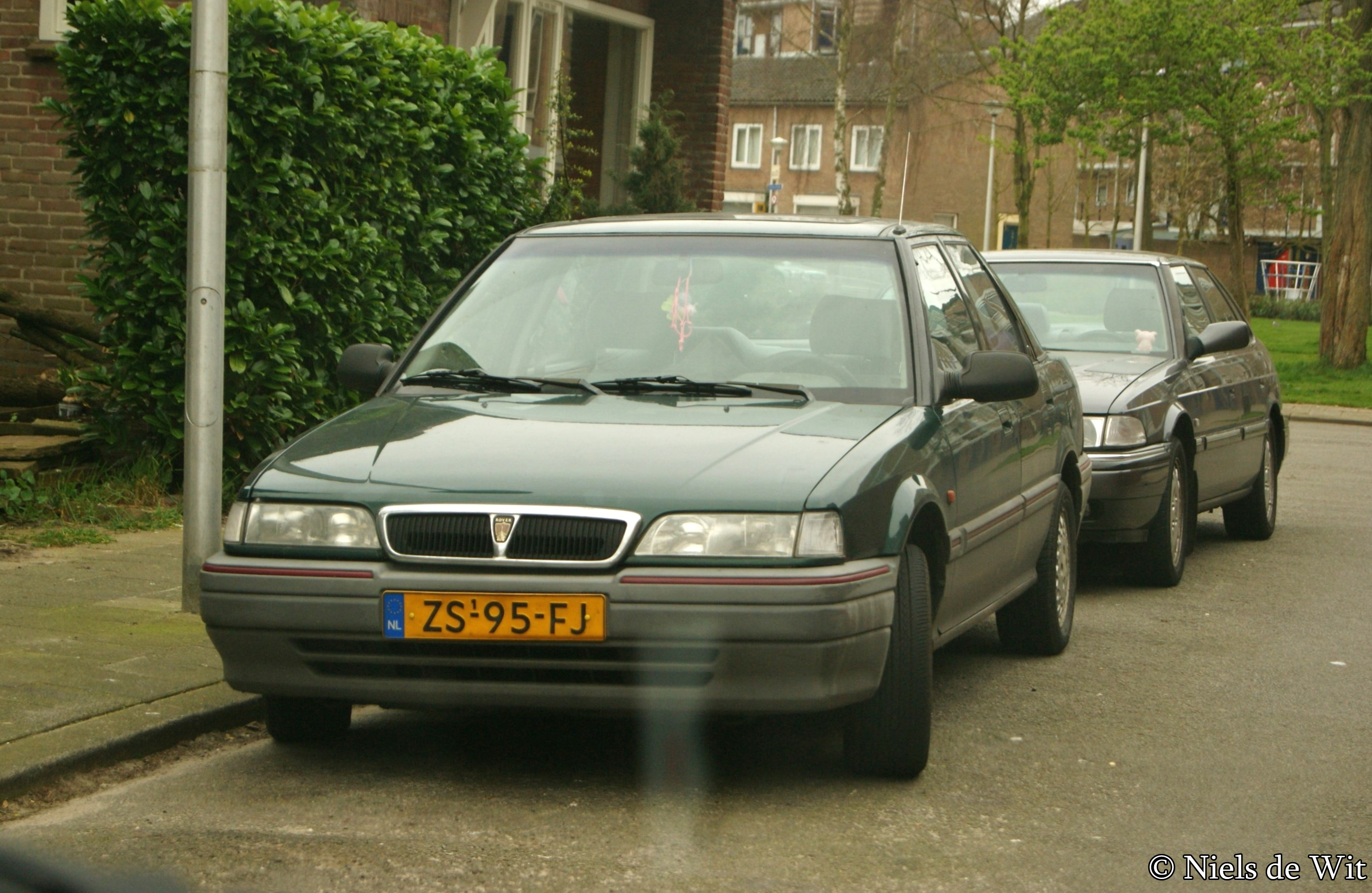
1992 Rover 400

- Family cars
  - 1992–1998 Rover 200 Coupe (216/218/220/220 Turbo)
  - 1990–1999 Rover 400 (414/416/418/420)
  - 1993–1999 Rover 600 (618/620/623 and 620ti)
- Executive cars
  - 1986–1999 Rover 800 (820/825/827 and Vitesse) and Sterling
  - 1999–2005 Rover 75

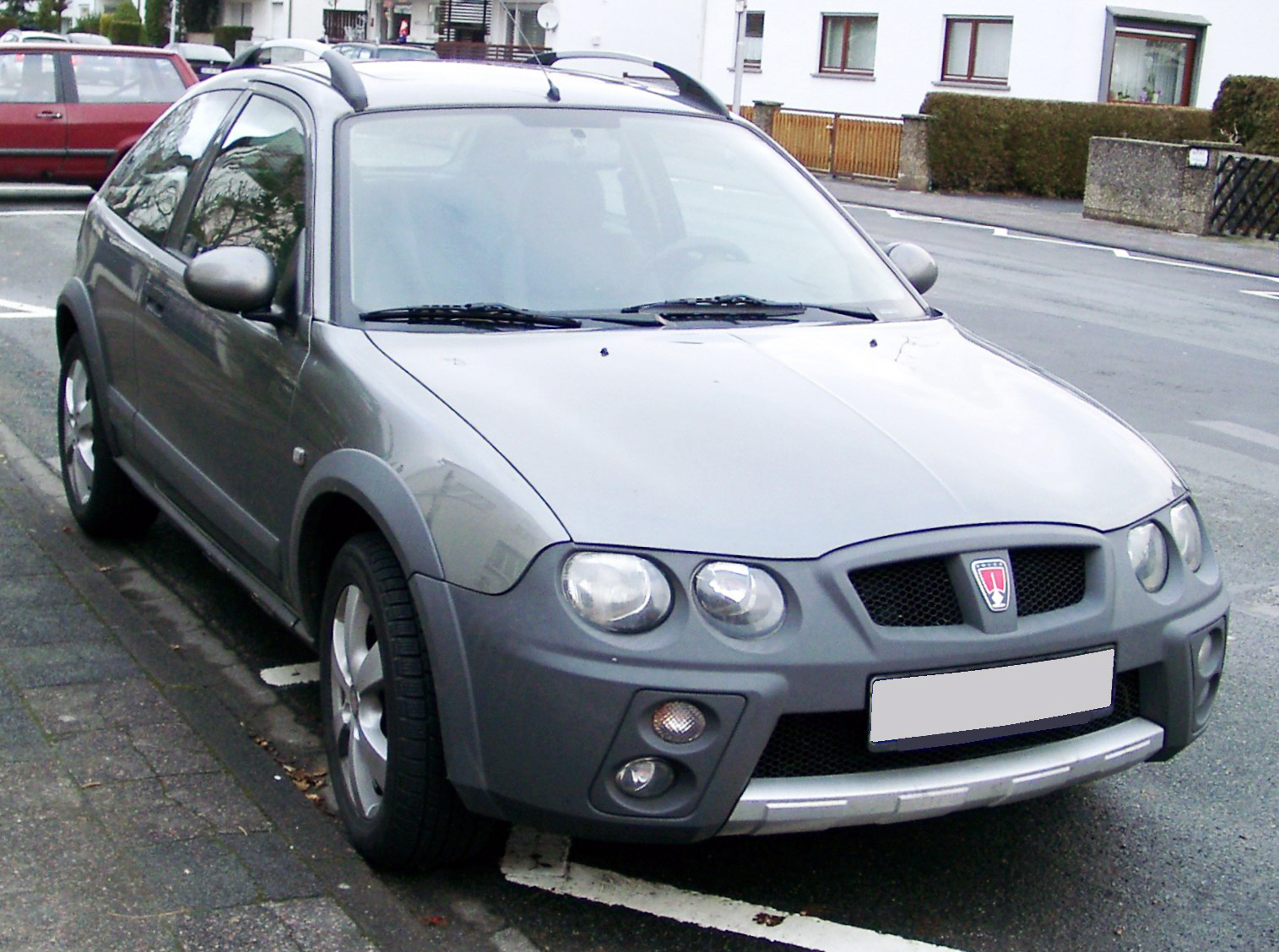
2004 Rover Streetwise

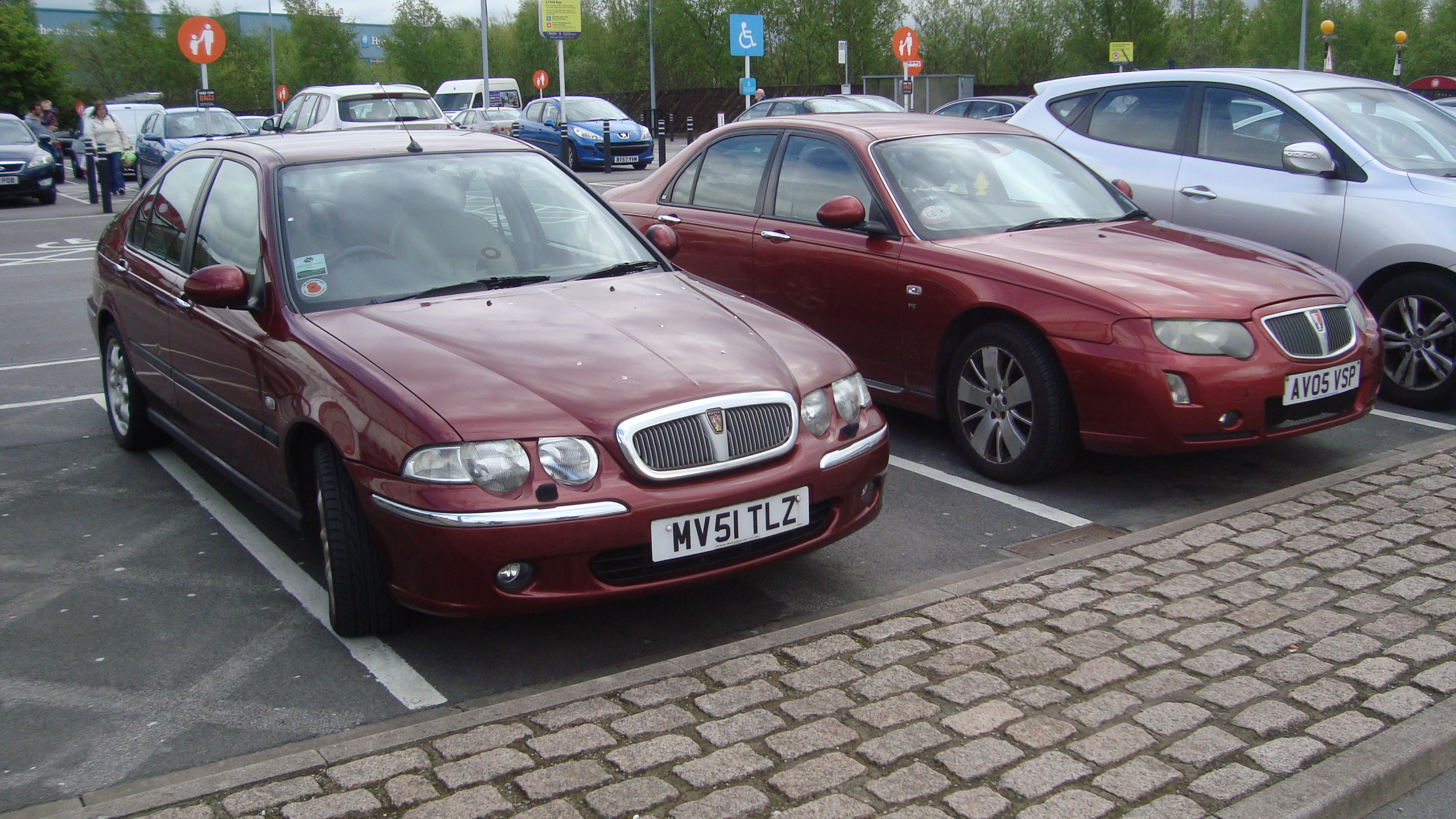
2001 Rover 45 and 2004 Rover 75 Mk II

=== Launched by MG Rover (2000–2005) ===
- Mini/Supermini cars
  - 2003–2005 CityRover
  - 2005 CityRover Mk II
- Family cars
  - 2000–2004 Rover 25
  - 2000–2004 Rover 45
  - 2003–2004 Rover Streetwise
  - 2004–2005 Rover 25 Mk II
  - 2004–2005 Rover 45 Mk II
  - 2004–2005 Rover Streetwise Mk II
- Executive cars
  - 2000–2004 Rover 75/Tourer
  - 2004–2005 Rover 75/Tourer Mk II
- Van
  - 2003–2005 Rover Commerce

== See also ==
- Rover Company
- British Leyland
- Austin Rover Group
- Rover Group
- MG Rover Group
