= Rover Company =

Former British car company

The Rover Company Limited
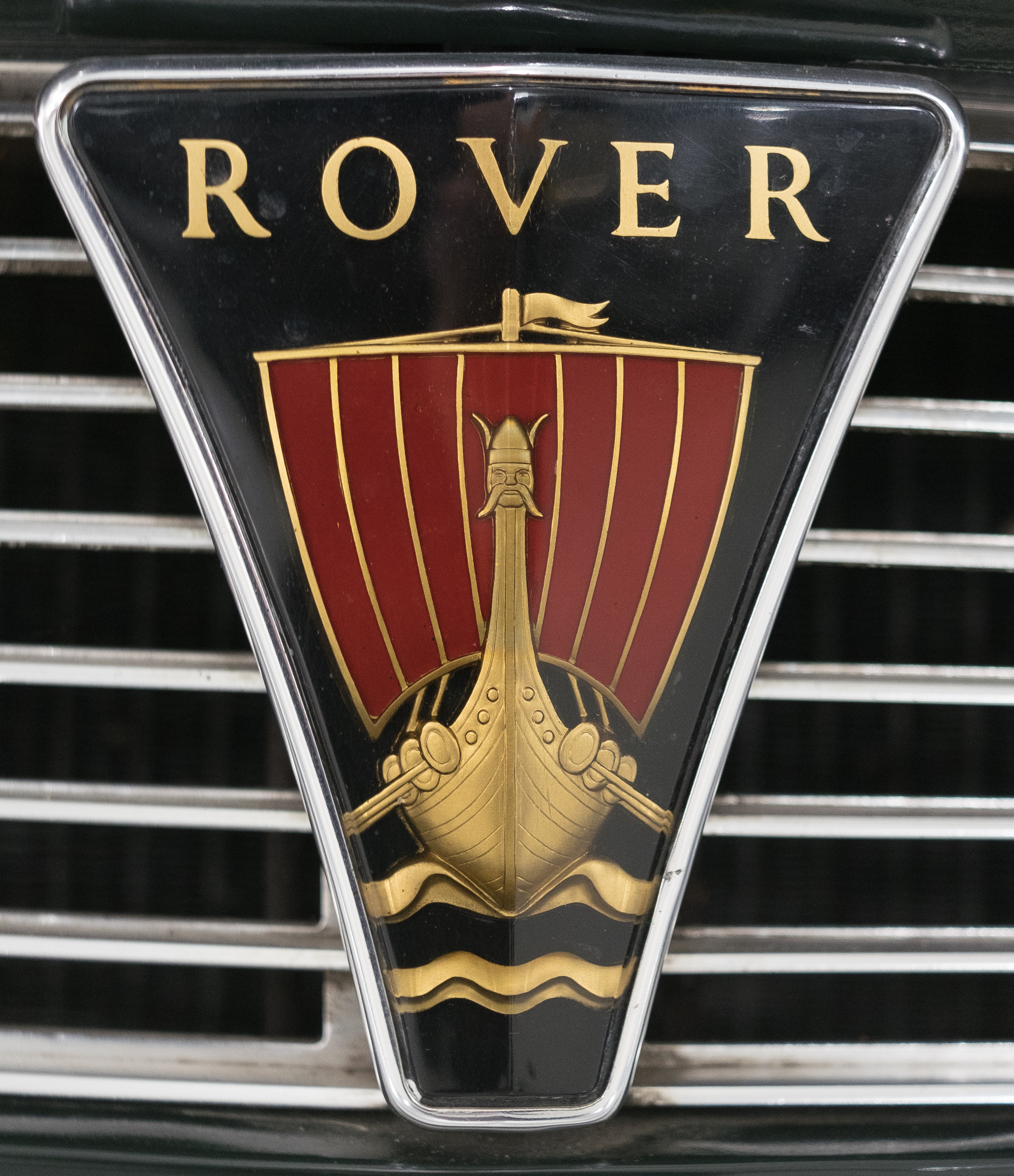

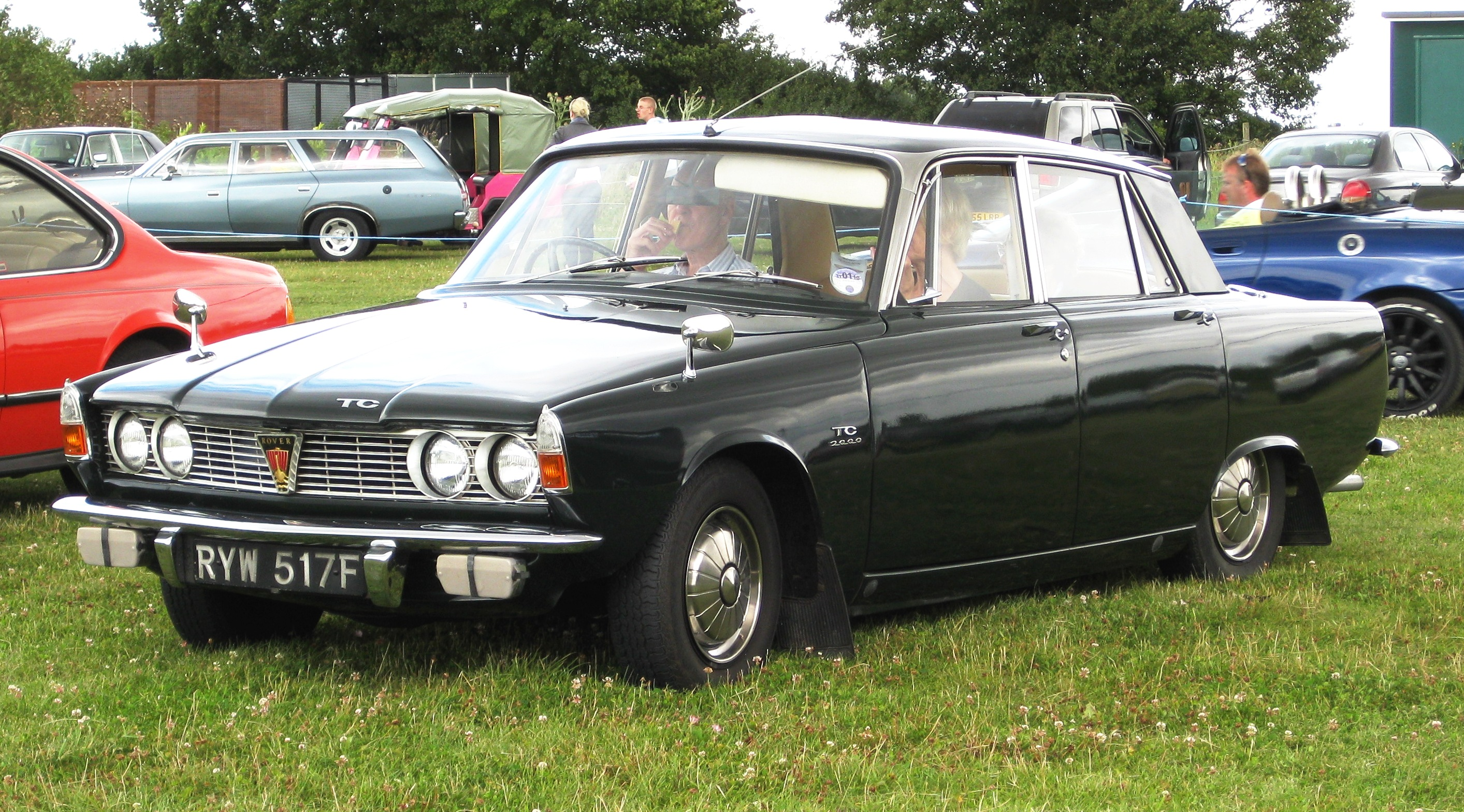
- Rover 2000 TC, introduced 1966
- Industry: Automotive industry Motorcycle industry (until 1925); Bicycle industry (until 1925)
- Founded: 1878; 148 years ago
- Founder: John Kemp Starley & William Sutton
- Defunct: 1967; 59 years ago
- Fate: Merged into Leyland Motors
- Successor: British Leyland Motor Corporation
- Headquarters: England: Coventry, Warwickshire (1904–1947); Solihull, Warwickshire (1947–1967)
- Key people: Spencer & Maurice Wilks (Management & Engineering, 1929–1963); John Towers
- Products: Rover Automobiles; Motorcycles (until 1925); Bicycles (until 1925); Land Rover All terrain vehicles
- Subsidiaries: Alvis Cars (1965–1967)

The Rover Company Limited was a British bicycle, motorcycle and car manufacturing company in independent operation between 1878 and 1967, beginning car manufacturing in 1904. It primarily operated from its base in Solihull, Warwickshire. Rover also manufactured the Land Rover series from 1948 onwards, and created the Range Rover in 1970, which went on to become its most successful and profitable product. Land Rover eventually became a separate company and brand in its own right.

Rover was bought by Leyland Motors in 1967, which had already acquired Standard-Triumph seven years earlier. Initially, Rover maintained a level of autonomy within the Leyland conglomerate, but by 1978, Leyland – by then British Leyland (BL) – had run into severe financial difficulties and had been nationalized by the British Government. Most of the assets of the former Rover Company were moved into a new BL subsidiary named Land Rover Ltd whilst the Rover marque itself continued to be used on other BL products which relied largely on Honda engineering. Nevertheless, Rover ultimately became the most prolific brand within BL and gave its name to the entire conglomerate in the form of the Rover Group in 1986, of which MG, Mini and Land Rover remained a part until the Rover Group was broken up by BMW in 2000.

Currently, the Rover marque is the dormant property of the Rover Company's de facto successor – Jaguar Land Rover (owned by Tata Motors), which still operates out of Rover's Solihull plant.

== History ==
=== Early history ===
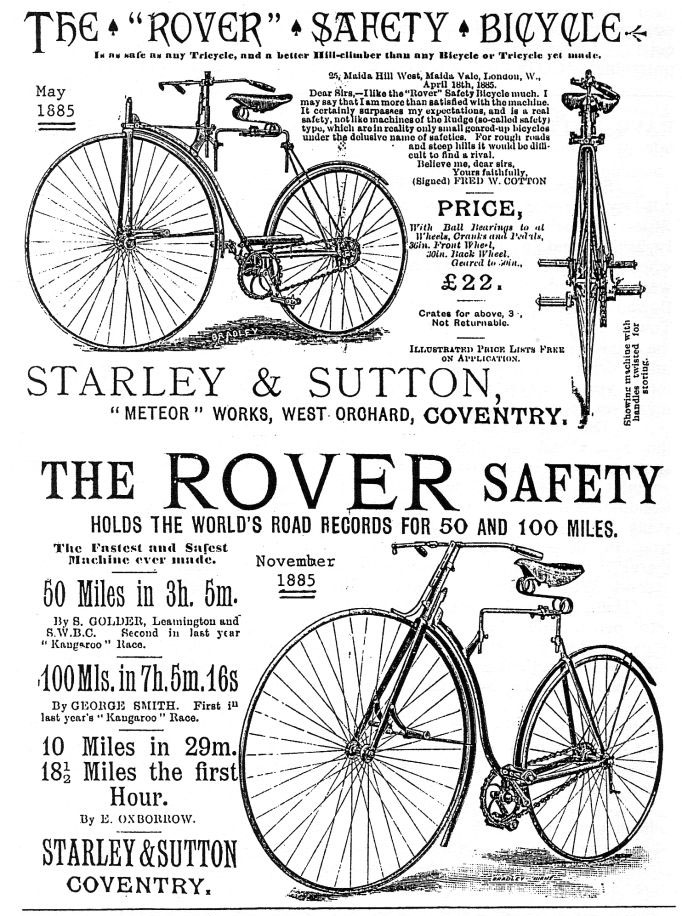
1885 Rover safety bicycle

The company was founded by John Kemp Starley and William Sutton in 1878. Starley had previously worked with his uncle, James Starley (father of the cycle trade), who began by manufacturing sewing machines and switched to bicycles in 1869.

The first product of the new company was a tricycle manufactured by Starley & Sutton Co. of Coventry, England, in 1883.

In the early 1880s bicycles were the relatively dangerous penny-farthings and high-wheel tricycles. J. K. Starley made history in 1885 by producing the Rover safety bicycle—a rear-wheel-drive, chain-driven cycle with two similar-sized wheels, making it more stable than the previous high-wheel designs. Cycling Magazine said the Rover had "set the pattern to the world"; the phrase was used in their advertising for many years. Starley's Rover is usually described by historians as the first recognisably modern bicycle.

In 1889, the company became J. K. Starley & Co. Ltd., and in the late 1890s, the Rover Cycle Company Ltd. The words for "bicycle" in Polish (rower) and Belarusian (ро́вар, rovar) are derived from the name of the company. The word ровер (rover) is also used in many parts of western Ukraine.

Rover started building motorcycles then cars using their Viking longship badge from 1904.

=== Rover motorcycles ===
In 1899 John Starley imported some of the early Peugeot motorcycles from France in for experimental development. His first project was to fit an engine to one of his Rover bicycles. Starley died early in October 1901 aged 46 and the business was taken over by secretary Harry Smith who became general manager and in time, managing director of Rover.

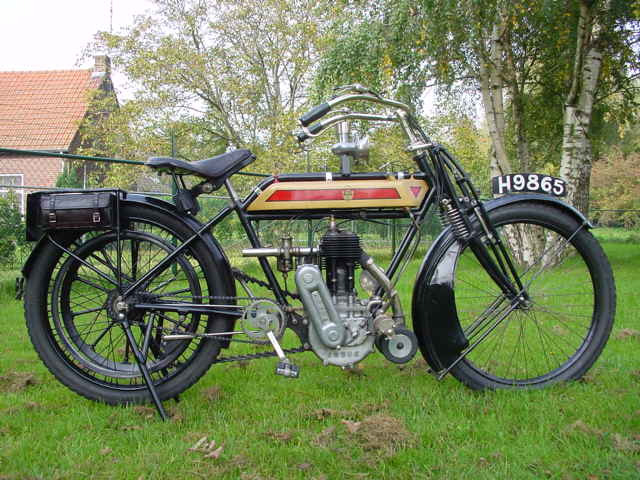
1912 Rover 3-speed

The company developed and produced the Rover Imperial motorcycle in November 1902. This was a 3.5 hp diamond-framed motorcycle, with the engine in the centre and 'springer' front forks, which was ahead of its time. This first Rover motorcycle had such innovative features as a spray carburettor, bottom-bracket engine, and mechanically operated valves. With a strong frame with double front down tubes and a good quality finish, over a thousand Rover motorcycles were sold in 1904. The following year, however, Rover stopped motorcycle production to concentrate on their 'safety bicycle' but in 1910 designer John Greenwood was commissioned to develop a new 3.5 hp 500 cc engine with spring-loaded tappets, a Bosch magneto and an innovative inverted tooth drive chain. It had a Brown and Barlow carburettor and Druid spring forks. This new model was launched at the 1910 Olympia show and over 500 were sold.

In 1913 a 'TT' model was launched with a shorter wheelbase and sports handlebars. The 'works team' of Dudley Noble and Chris Newsome had some success and won the works team award.

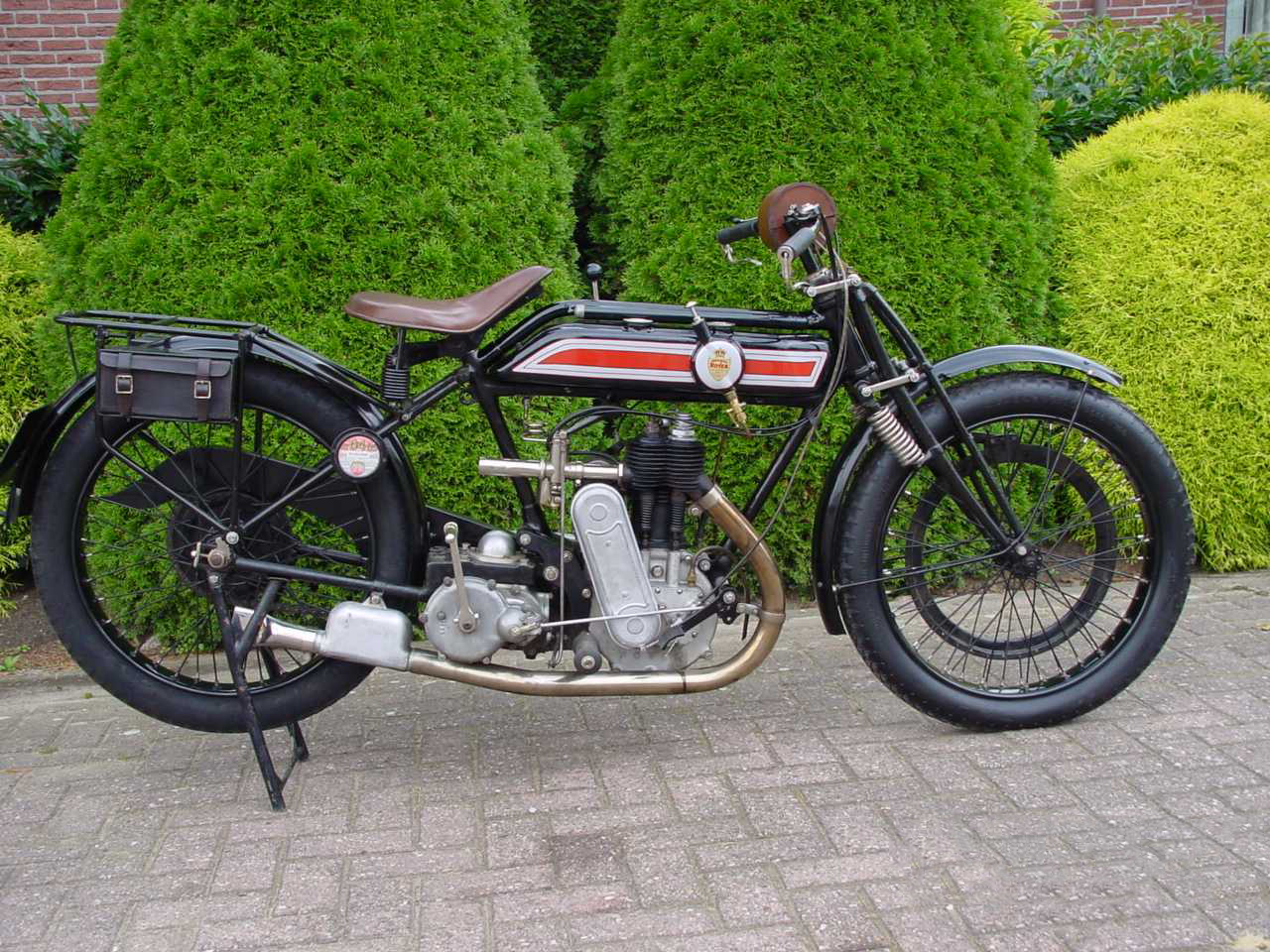
1920 Rover 500 cc

Rover supplied 499 cc single-cylinder motorcycles to the Russian Army during the First World War. The company began to focus on car production at the end of the war, but Rover still produced motorcycles with 248 cc and 348 cc Rover overhead valve engines and with JAP engines, including a 676 cc V-twin. In 1924 Rover introduced a new lightweight 250 cc motorcycle with unit construction of engine and gearbox. This had lights front and rear as well as a new design of internal expanding brakes.

Poor sales of their motorcycles caused Rover to end motorcycle production and concentrate solely on the production of motor cars. Between 1903 and 1924 Rover had produced more than 10,000 motorcycles.

=== Early Rover cars ===
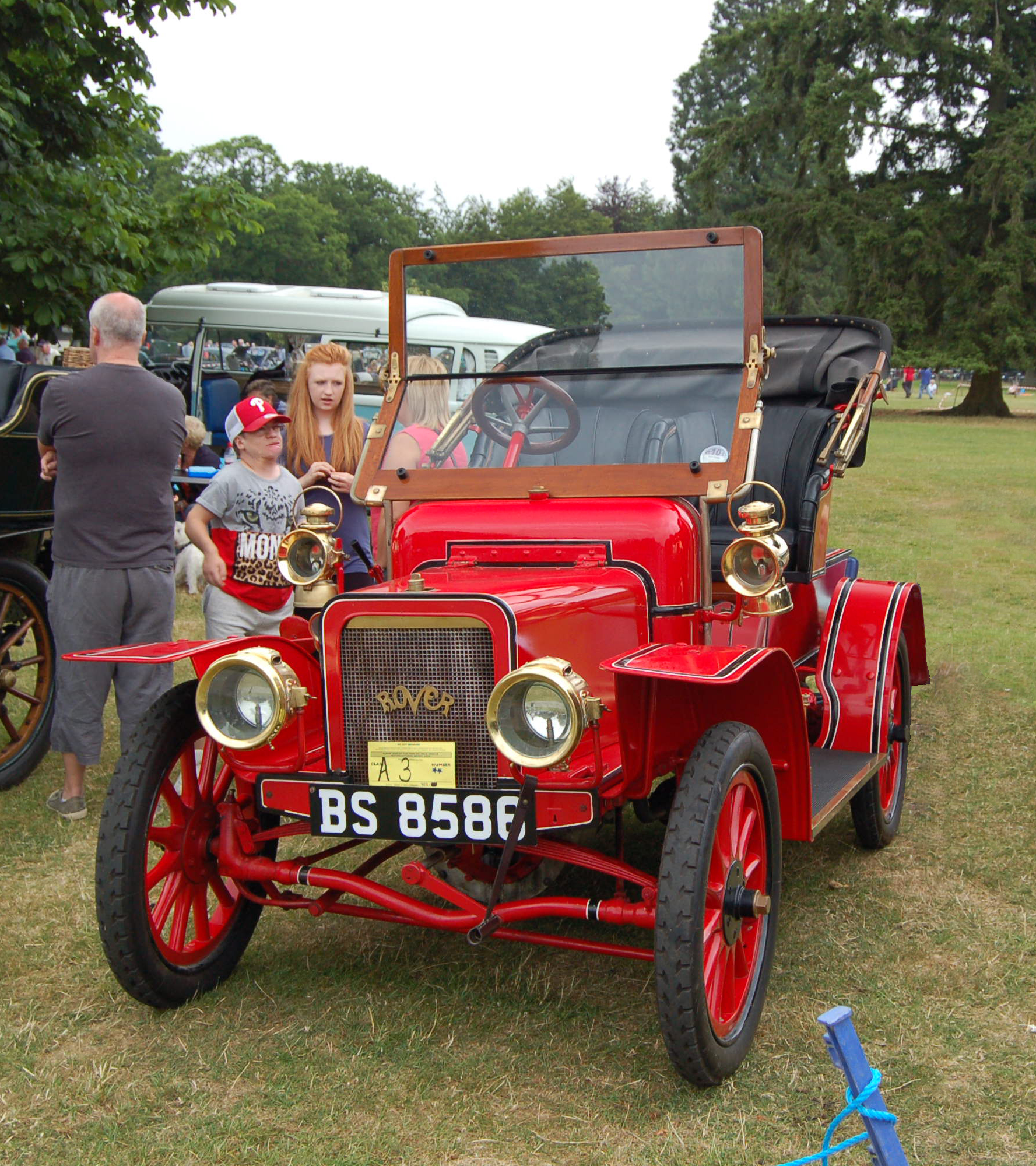
1906 Six open two-seater

In 1888, Starley made an electric car, but it was never put into production.

Three years after Starley's death in 1901 the Rover company began producing automobiles with the two-seater Rover Eight to the designs of Edmund Lewis, who came from the Daimler. Lewis left the company to join Deasy in late 1905.

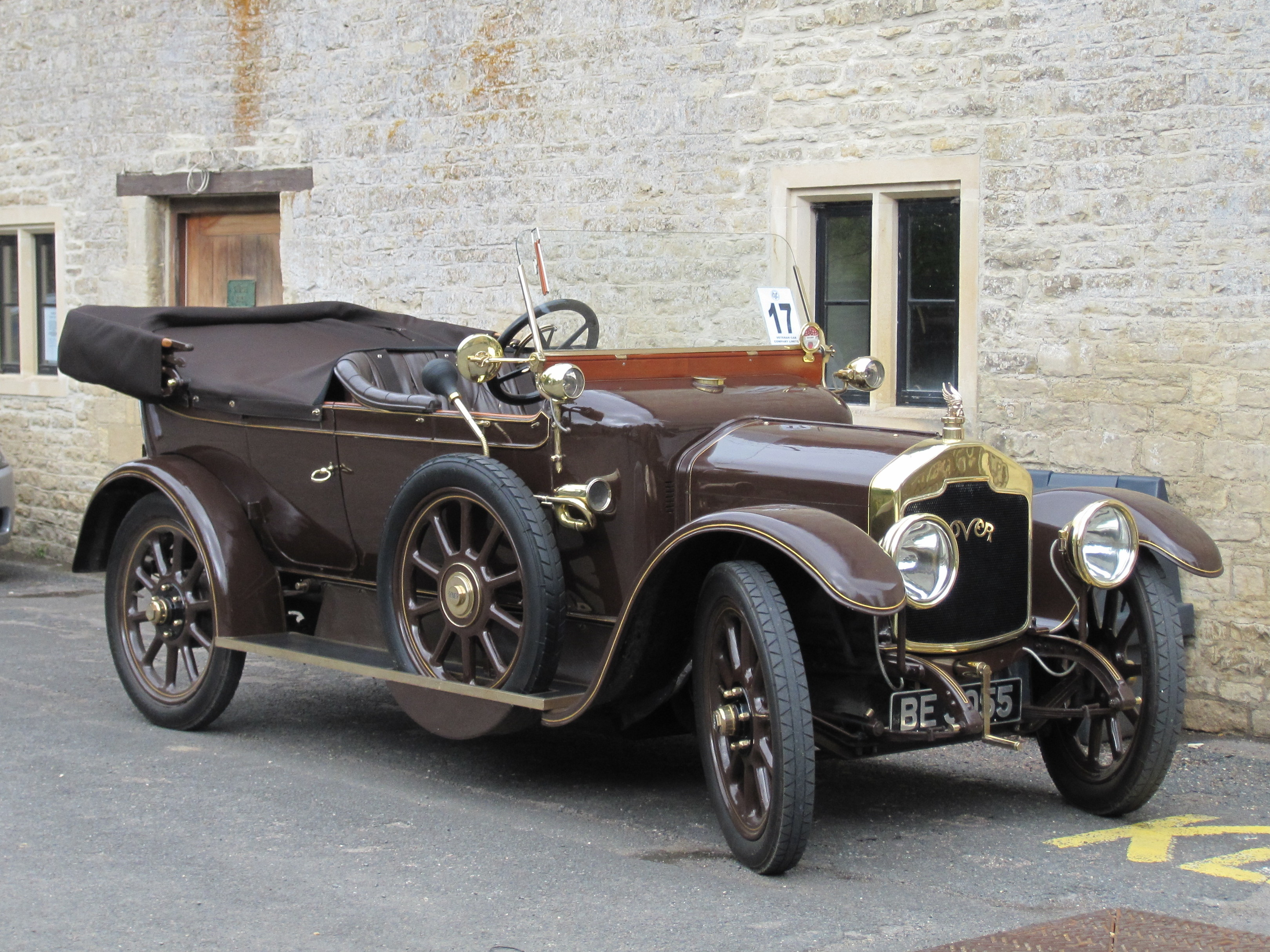
1914 Twelve (Clegg) open tourer

He was eventually replaced by Owen Clegg, who joined from Wolseley in 1910 and set about reforming the product range. Short-lived experiments with sleeve valve engines were abandoned, and the 12hp model was introduced in 1912. This car was so successful that all other cars were dropped, and for a while, Rover pursued a "one model" policy. Clegg left in 1912 to join the French subsidiary of Darracq and Company London.

During the First World War, they made motorcycles, lorries to Maudslay designs, and, not having a suitable one of their own, ambulances to a Sunbeam design.

=== Restructure and reorganisation ===
The business was not very successful during the 1920s and did not pay a dividend from 1923 until the mid-1930s. In December 1928 the chairman of Rover advised shareholders that the accumulation of the substantial losses of the 1923–1928 years together with the costs of that year's reorganisation must be recognised by a reduction of 60 per cent in the value of capital of the company.

During 1928 Frank Searle was appointed managing director to supervise recovery. Searle was by training a locomotive engineer with motor industry experience at Daimler and, most recently, had been managing director of Imperial Airways.

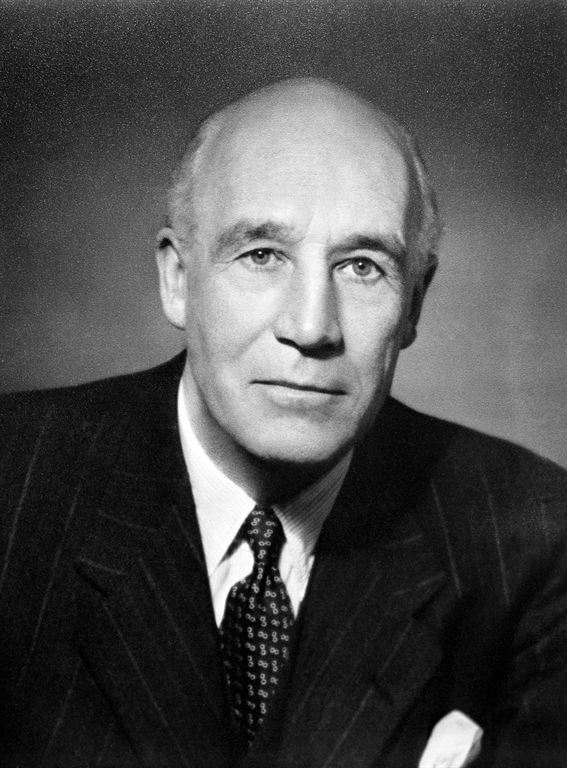
Spencer Wilks

1936 Ten 6-light saloon the first car to be developed after the Wilks brothers, Spencer and Maurice, joined Rover

On his recommendation Spencer Wilks was brought in from Hillman as general manager and appointed to the board in 1929. That year, Searle split Midland Light Car Bodies from Rover in an effort to save money and instructed Robert Boyle and Maurice Wilks to design a new small car.

This was the Rover Scarab with a rear-mounted V-twin-cylinder air-cooled engine announced in 1931, a van version was shown at Olympia, but it did not go into production. During this time the Rover 10/25 was introduced, with bodies made by the Pressed Steel Company. This was the same body as used on the Hillman Minx. Prior to this time Rover had been a great supporter of the very light Weymann bodies that went suddenly out of fashion with the demand for shiny coachwork and more curved body shapes. Weymann bodies remained in the factory catalogue until 1933.

Frank Searle and Spencer Wilks set about reorganising the company and moving it upmarket to cater for people who wanted something "superior" to Fords and Austins. In 1930 Spencer Wilks was joined by his brother, Maurice, who had also been at Hillman as chief engineer. Spencer Wilks was to stay with the company until 1962, and his brother until 1963.

The company showed profits in the 1929 and 1930 years but with the economic downturn in 1931 Rover reported a loss of £77,529. 1932 produced a loss of £103,000 but a turn around following yet more reorganisation resulted in a profit of £46,000 in 1933. The new assembly operations in Australia and New Zealand were closed.

Frank Searle left the board near the end of the calendar year 1931, his work done.

Building on successes such as beating the Blue Train for the first time in 1930 in the Blue Train Races, the Wilks Brothers established Rover as a company with several European royal, aristocratic, and governmental warrants, and upper-middle-class and star clients.

=== Second World War and gas turbines ===
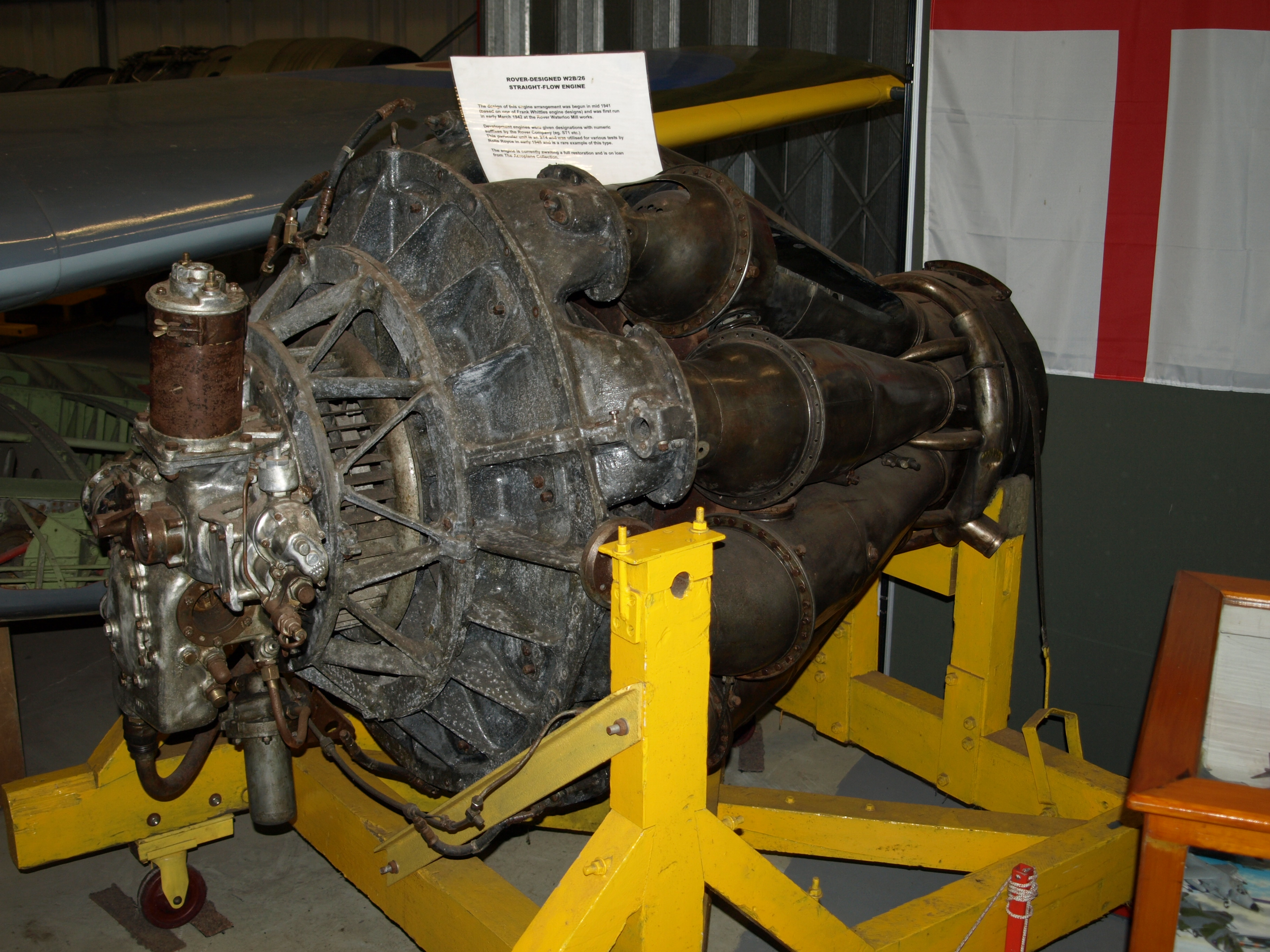
A Rover W.2B/26 on display at the Midland Air Museum. This design was later to become the Rolls-Royce Derwent.

In the late 1930s, in anticipation of the potential hostilities that would become the Second World War, the British government started a rearmament programme, and as part of this, "shadow factories" were built. These were paid for by the government but staffed and run by private companies. Three were run by Rover: one, at Acocks Green, Birmingham, started operation in 1937, a second, larger one, at Solihull, started in 1940 and the third, at Drakelow Tunnels, Kidderminster, started in 1943. All three were employed making aero engines and airframes. The original main works at Helen Street, Coventry, was severely damaged by bombing in 1940 and 1941 and never regained full production.

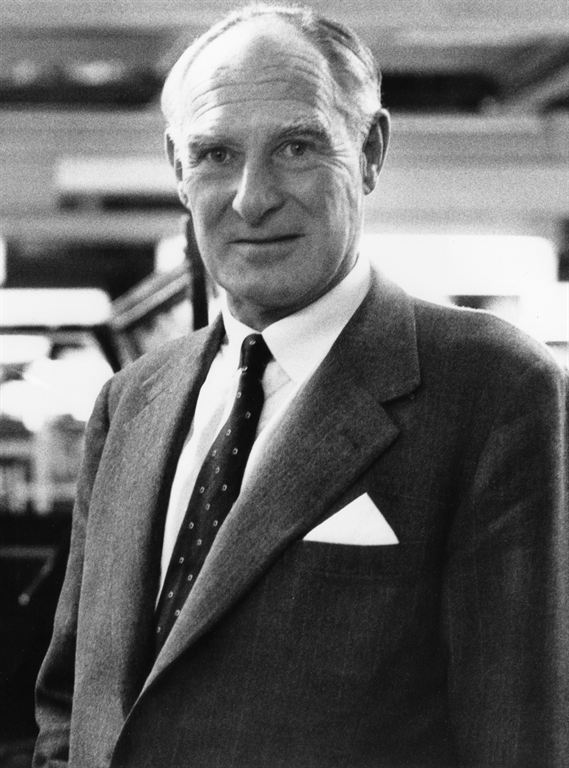
Maurice Wilks

In early 1940, Rover was approached by Frank Whittle to do work for Whittle's company, Power Jets. This led to a proposal from Power Jets in which Rover would put forward £50,000 of capital in exchange for shares in Power Jets. Rover contacted the Air Ministry (AM) regarding the proposal, which ultimately led to an arrangement between Rover and former Power Jets contractor British Thomson-Houston (BTH) to develop and produce Whittle's jet engine. The Air Ministry had left Whittle and Power Jets out of these negotiations. Rover chief engineer Maurice Wilks led the team to develop the engine, improving the performance over the original Whittle design. The first test engines to the W.2B design were built in Bankfield Shed, a former cotton mill in Barnoldswick, Lancashire which Rover moved into in June 1941 (along with Waterloo Mill in Clitheroe). Testing commenced towards the end of October 1941.

A need for greater expertise within the project, along with difficult relations between Rover management and Frank Whittle (not least because Rover under AM approval had secretly designed a different engine layout, known within Rover as the B.26, which they thought was superior), led to Rover handing over their part in the jet engine project and the Barnoldswick factory to Rolls-Royce in exchange for the latter's Meteor tank engine factory at Ascot Road, Nottingham, the result of a handshake deal between Rover's Spencer Wilks and Rolls-Royce's Ernest Hives made in a local inn in Clitheroe. The official hand-over date was 1 April 1943, though there was a considerable overlap, and several key Rover staff such as Adrian Lombard and John Herriot, the latter being at Rover on secondment from the Air Inspection Department (AID) of the AM, moved to Rolls-Royce. In exchange for the jet engine project and its facilities, Rover was given the contract and production equipment to make Meteor tank engines, which continued until 1964. The Meteor engine was superseded for new tanks in 1962, and as Rover wanted more manufacturing capacity for the Land Rover they transferred the manufacture of Meteor spare parts for the British and other governments back to Rolls-Royce at Shrewsbury. Although Rolls-Royce under Stanley Hooker were soon to be able to start producing the Whittle-designed W.2B/23 engine (known within Rover as the B.23, later named by Rolls-Royce the Welland), they evaluated the 4 Lombard/Herriot re-designed Rover W.2B/B.26 engines under test at the time of the takeover, and selected the Rover design for their own jet engine development (it became the Rolls-Royce Derwent engine).

After the Second World War, the company abandoned Helen Street and bought the two shadow factories. Acocks Green carried on for a while, making Meteor engines for tanks such as the Centurion and Conqueror, and Solihull became the new centre for vehicles, with production resuming in 1947. This was the year Rover produced the Rover 12 Sports Tourer. 200 cars were built for the export market but all had RHD so many cars stayed in the UK. Solihull would become the home of the Land Rover.

=== Experimental cars ===
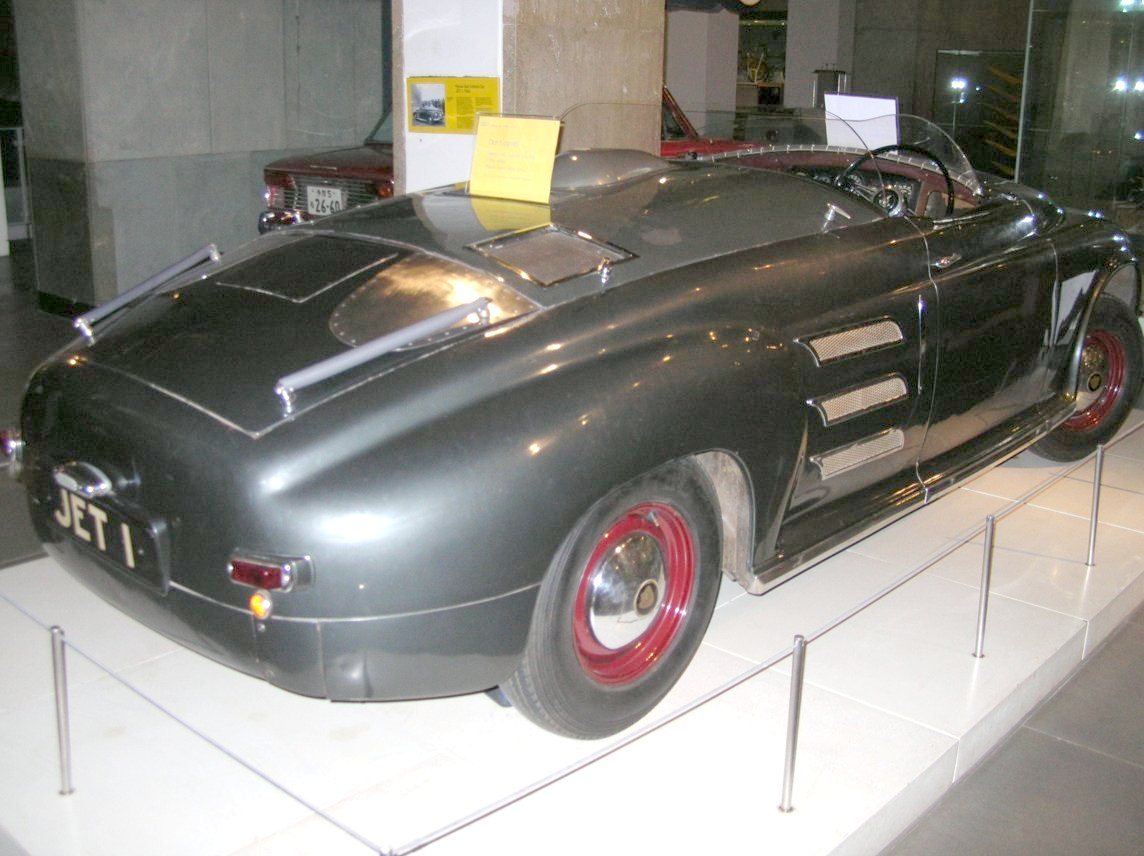
JET 1

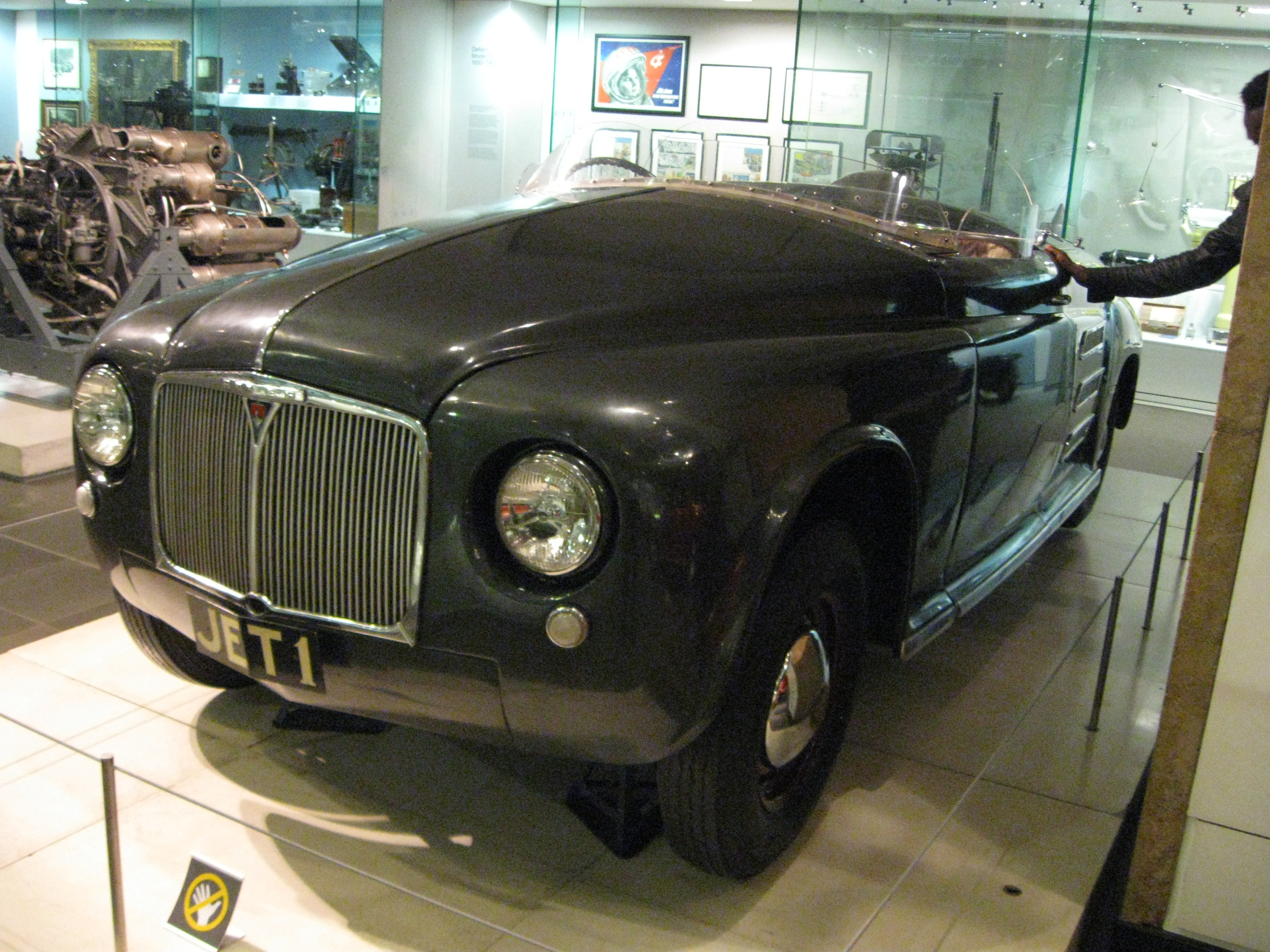
Gas turbine experimental car

Despite the difficulties experienced with the jet engine project, Rover was interested in the development of the gas turbine engine to power vehicles. In 1945, Rover hired engineers Frank Bell and Spen King away from Rolls-Royce to assist Maurice Wilks in the development of automotive gas turbines. By 1949, the team developed a turbine that ran at 55,000 rpm, produced more than 100 horsepower (75 kW), and could run on petrol, paraffin, or diesel oil. Rover's early turbine engines consumed fuel at a rate much greater than piston engines, equivalent to 6 miles per imperial gallon (5.0 mpg_{‑US}; 47 L/100 km). Although fuel consumption was later reduced by using a heat exchanger, it was never as low as that of contemporary piston engines.

In March 1950, Rover showed the JET1 prototype, the first car powered with a gas turbine engine, to the public. JET1, an open two-seat tourer, had the engine positioned behind the seats, air intake grilles on either side of the car, and exhaust outlets on the top of the tail. During tests, the car reached a top speed of 88 mph (142 km/h). After being shown in the United Kingdom and the United States in 1950, JET1 was further developed, and was subjected to speed trials on the Jabbeke highway in Belgium in June 1952, where it exceeded 150 miles per hour (240 km/h). JET1 is currently on display at the London Science Museum.

Four further prototypes were built, the P4-based front-engined T2 and rear-engined T2A saloons, the rear-engined four-wheel-drive T3 coupé, and the front-engined front-wheel drive T4 saloon.

Rover and the BRM Formula One team joined forces to produce the Rover-BRM, a gas turbine-powered sports prototype that entered the 1963 24 hours of Le Mans, driven by Graham Hill and Richie Ginther. It averaged 107.8 mph (173 km/h) and had a top speed of 142 mph (229 km/h).

Rover also ran several experimental diesel engine projects in relation to the Land Rover. The 2-litre, 52 horsepower (39 kW) diesel unit designed and built by Rover for its 4x4 had entered production in 1956 and was one of Britain's first modern high-speed automotive diesel engines. Experimental projects were undertaken to improve the engine's power delivery, running qualities, and fuel tolerances. British Army requirements led to the development of a multifuel version of the 2.25-litre variant of the engine in 1962, which could run on petrol, diesel, Jet-A, or kerosene. However, the engine's power output when running on low-grade fuel was too low for the Army's uses. Rover developed a highly advanced (for the time) turbodiesel version of its engine in the mid-1960s to power its experimental '129-inch' heavy duty Land Rover designs. This 2.5-litre engine used a turbocharger built by Rover's gas turbine division as well as an intercooler. This was one of the first times these features had been incorporated on such a small-capacity diesel unit, but they were not adopted.

After the Leyland Motor Corporation takeover, the Rover Gas Turbine was used in a number of Leyland trucks, including one shown at the 1968 Commercial Motor Show. Rover gas turbines also powered the first Advanced Passenger Train.

=== Golden years ===
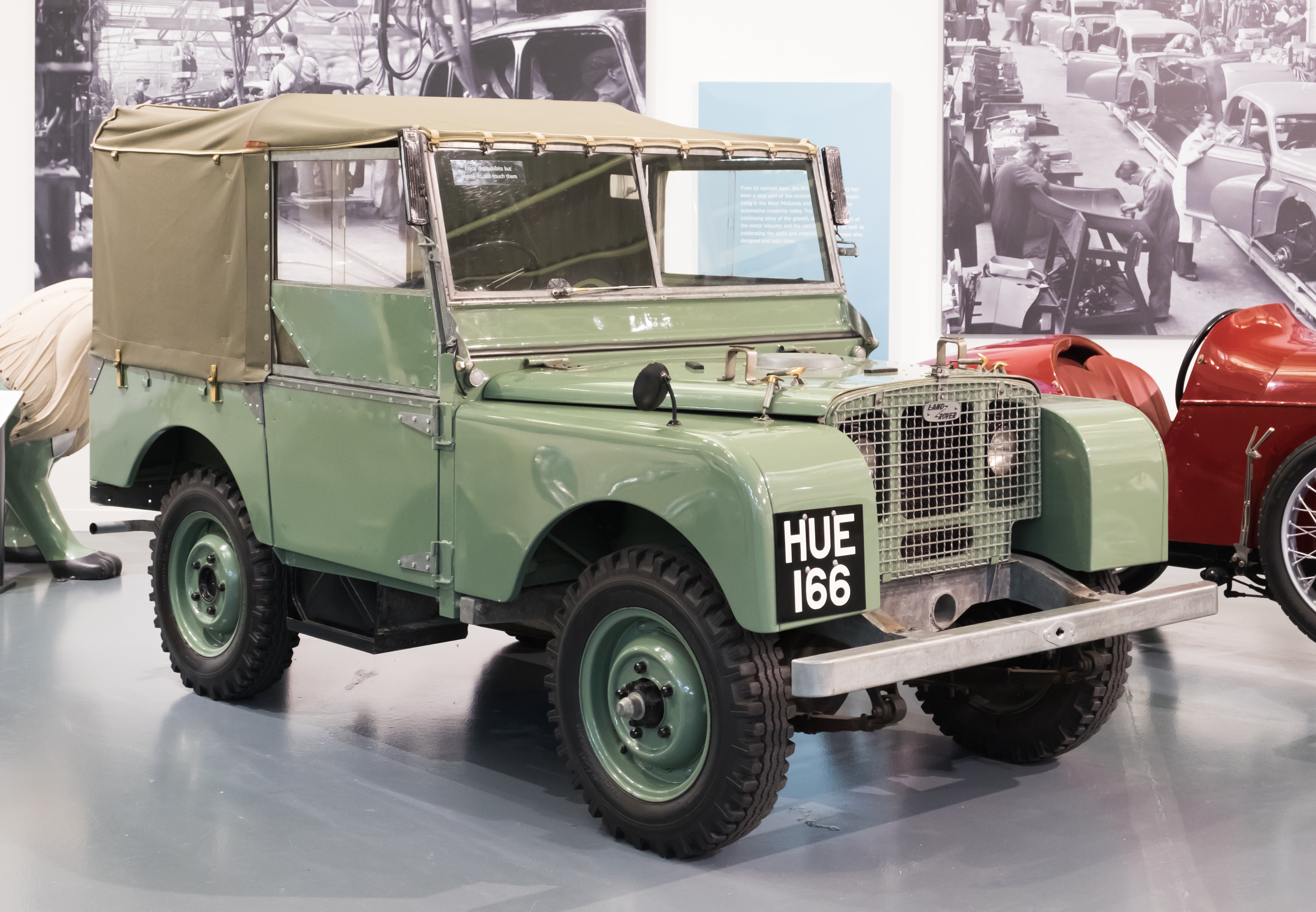
The first production Land Rover (HUE 166) 1948

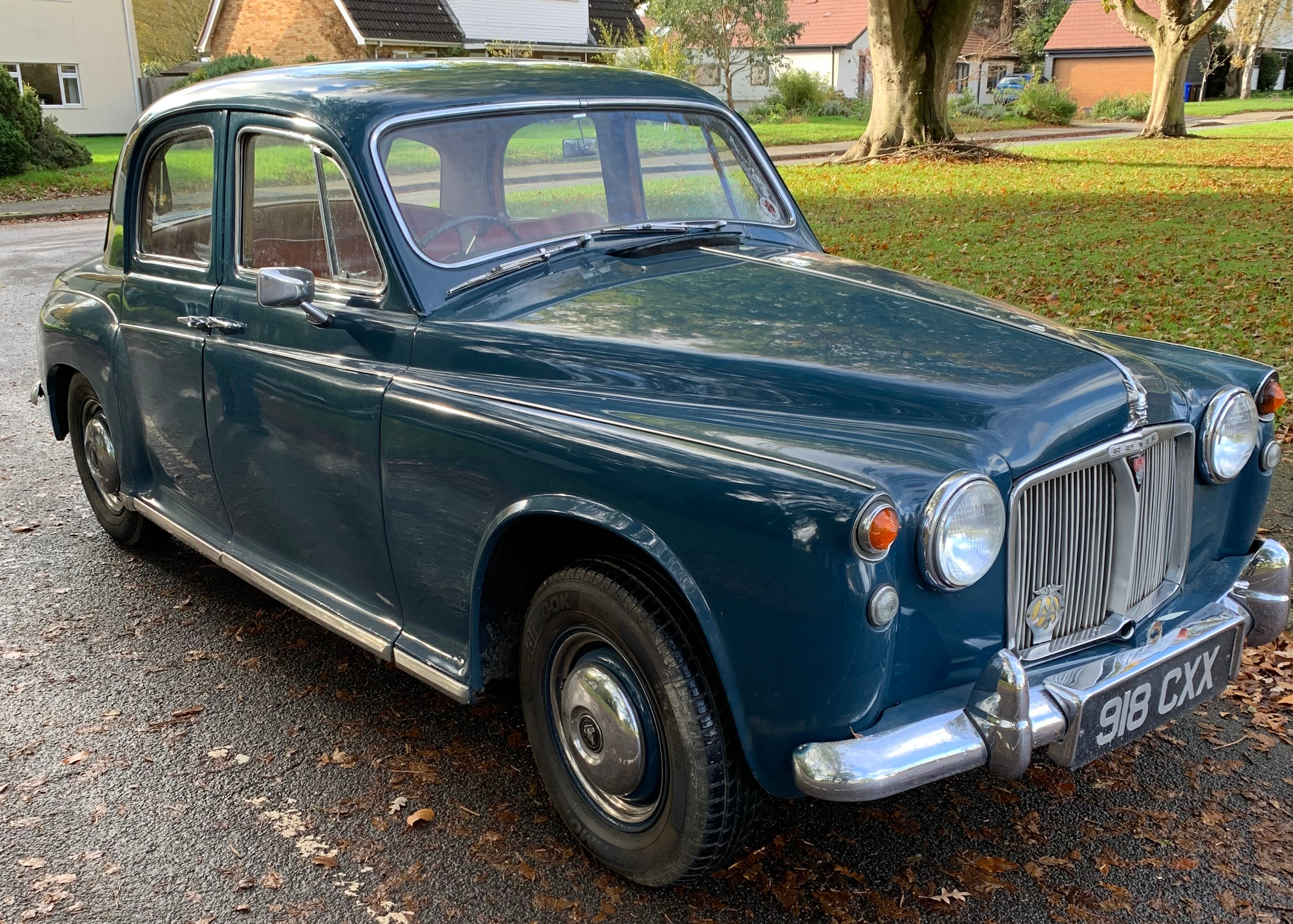
1961 Rover 80 or P4

The 1950s and '60s were fruitful years for the company. The Land Rover became a runaway success (despite Rover's reputation for making upmarket saloons, the utilitarian Land Rover was actually the company's biggest seller throughout the 1950s, '60s, and '70s), as well as the P5 and P6 saloons equipped with a 3.5L (215ci) aluminium V8 (the design and tooling of which was purchased from Buick) and pioneering research into gas turbine-powered vehicles.

As the '60s drew to a close Rover was working on a number of innovative projects. Having purchased the Alvis company in 1965 Rover was working on a V8-powered supercar to sell under the Alvis name. The prototype, called the P6BS, was completed and the finalised styling and engineering proposal, the P9, was drawn up. Rover was also working on the P8 project which aimed to replace the existing P5 large saloon with a modern design similar in concept to a scaled-up P6.

When Leyland Motors joined with British Motor Holdings and Rover and Jaguar became corporate partners these projects were cancelled to prevent internal competition with Jaguar products. The P8 in particular was cancelled in a very late stage of preparation- Rover had already ordered the dies and stamping equipment for making the car's body panels at Pressed Steel when ordered to stop work.

Rover continued to develop its '100-inch Station Wagon', which became the ground-breaking Range Rover, launched in 1970. This also used the ex-Buick V8 engine as well as the P6's innovative safety-frame body structure design and features such as permanent four-wheel drive and all-round disc brakes. The Range Rover was initially designed as a utility vehicle which could offer the off-road capability of the Land Rover, but in a more refined and car-like package.

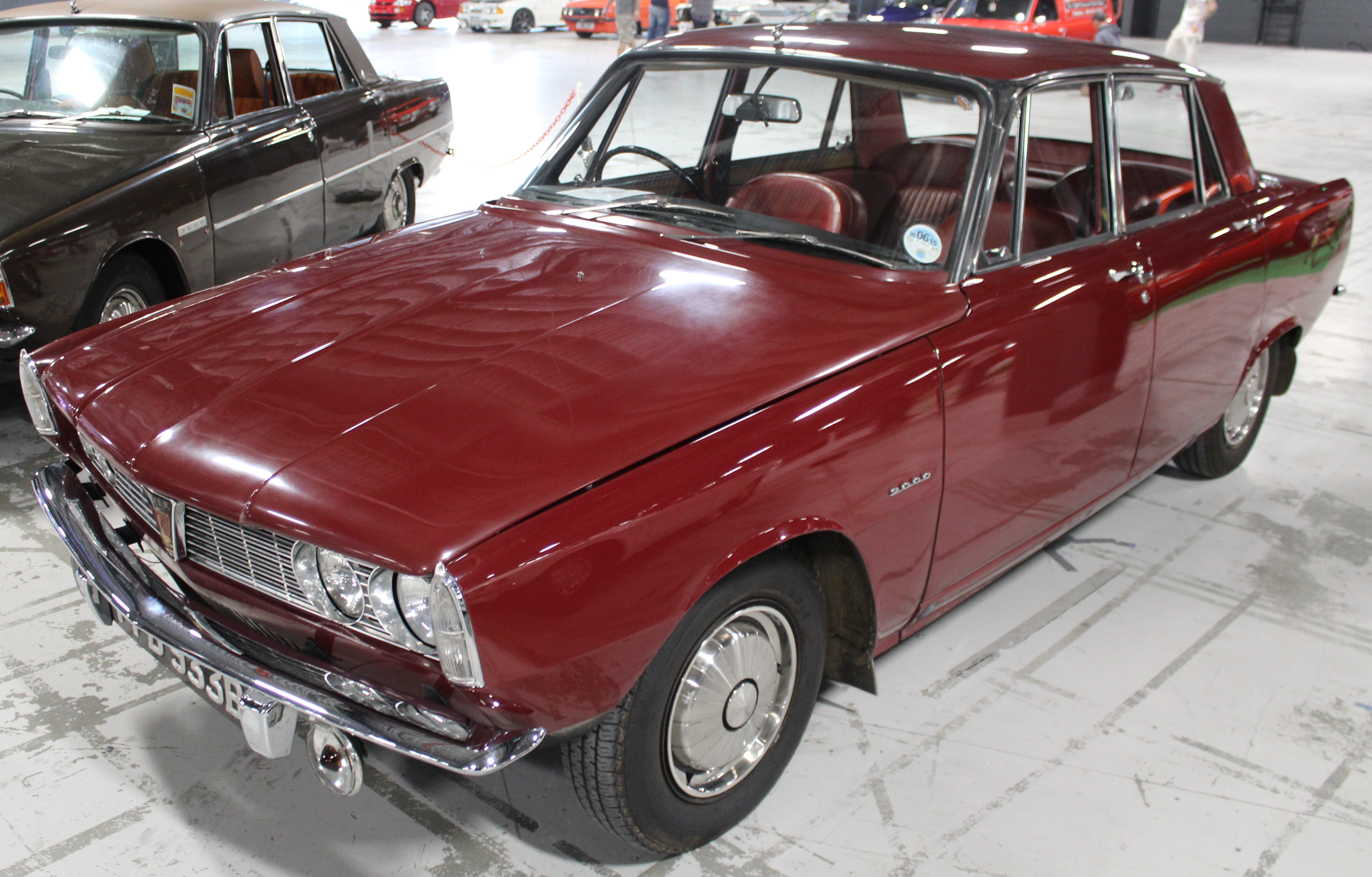
1964 2000 or P6

=== Mergers to LMC and BL ===
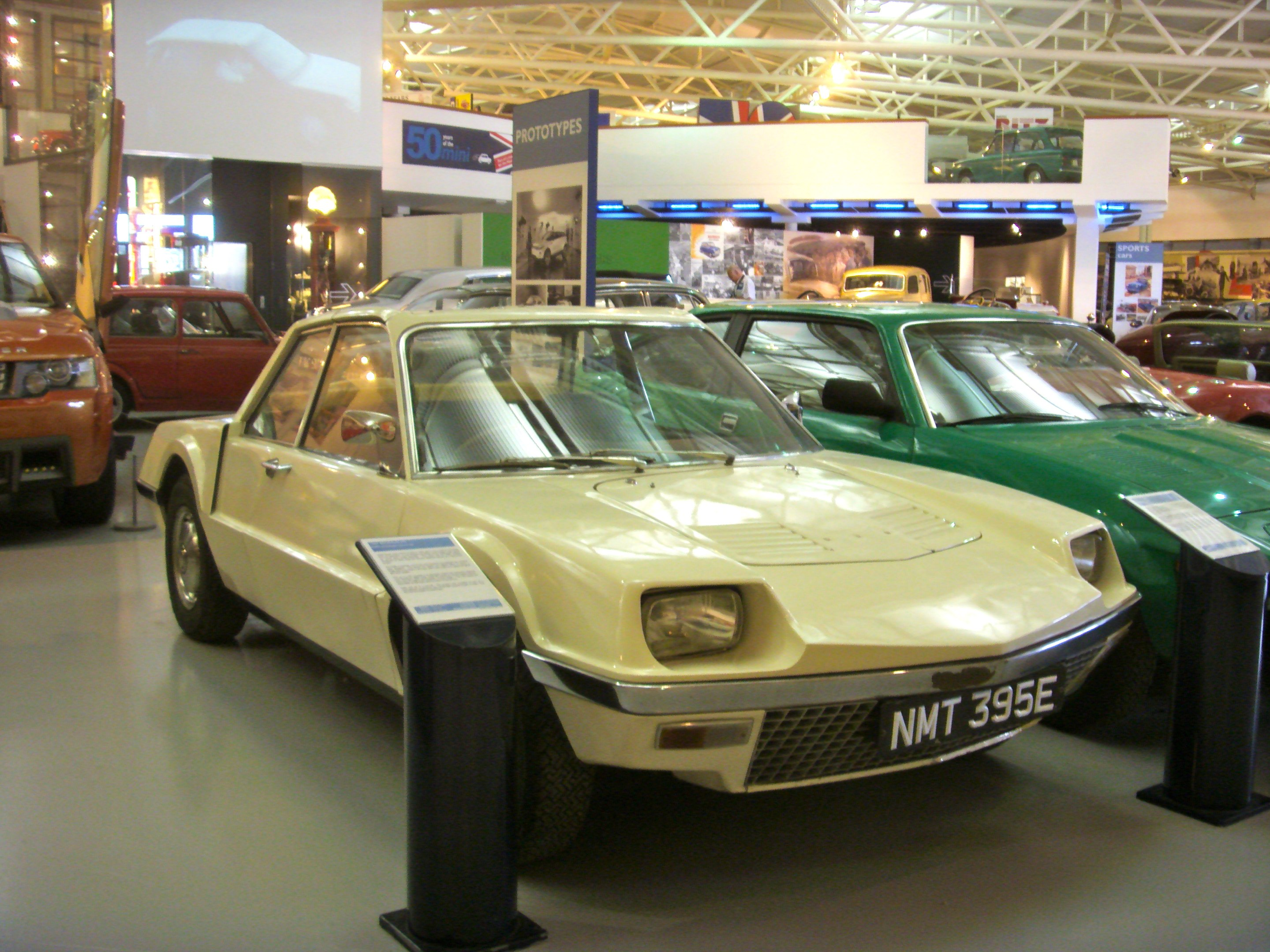
This Rover prototype for a mid-engined sports car was shown to the press in 1967, but politics in the wake of the BLMC merger got in the way, and the model never entered production.

In 1967, Rover became part of the Leyland Motor Corporation (LMC), which already owned Triumph. The next year, LMC merged with British Motor Holdings (BMH) to become the British Leyland Motor Corporation (BLMC). Rover was grouped together with Triumph and Jaguar in the Specialist Division, which was the performance-luxury division of BLMC. This was the beginning of the end for the independent Rover Company, as the Solihull-based company's heritage drowned beneath the infamous industrial relations and managerial problems that beset the British motor industry throughout the 1970s.

Whilst Jaguar retained much of its independence within the Specialist Division, the former Rover and Triumph organisations worked on a series of shared projects throughout the 1970s - but the only Rover product to be launched was the Rover SD1 (Specialist Division No.1) in 1976, and was the final car that can be thought of as coming from the original Rover Company lineage, being designed by ex-Rover engineers and was initially produced at Solihull. In 1978, British Leyland created a new subsidiary known as Land Rover Limited which encompassed much of the original assets of the Rover Company and the production of the Series Land Rover and Range Rover, which by now had become one of the beleaguered conglomerate's most profitable product lines. Production of the Rover SD1 moved to the former BMC/Morris plant in Cowley in 1982, signalling the end for Rover-badged car production at the historic Lode Lane site.

== Models ==
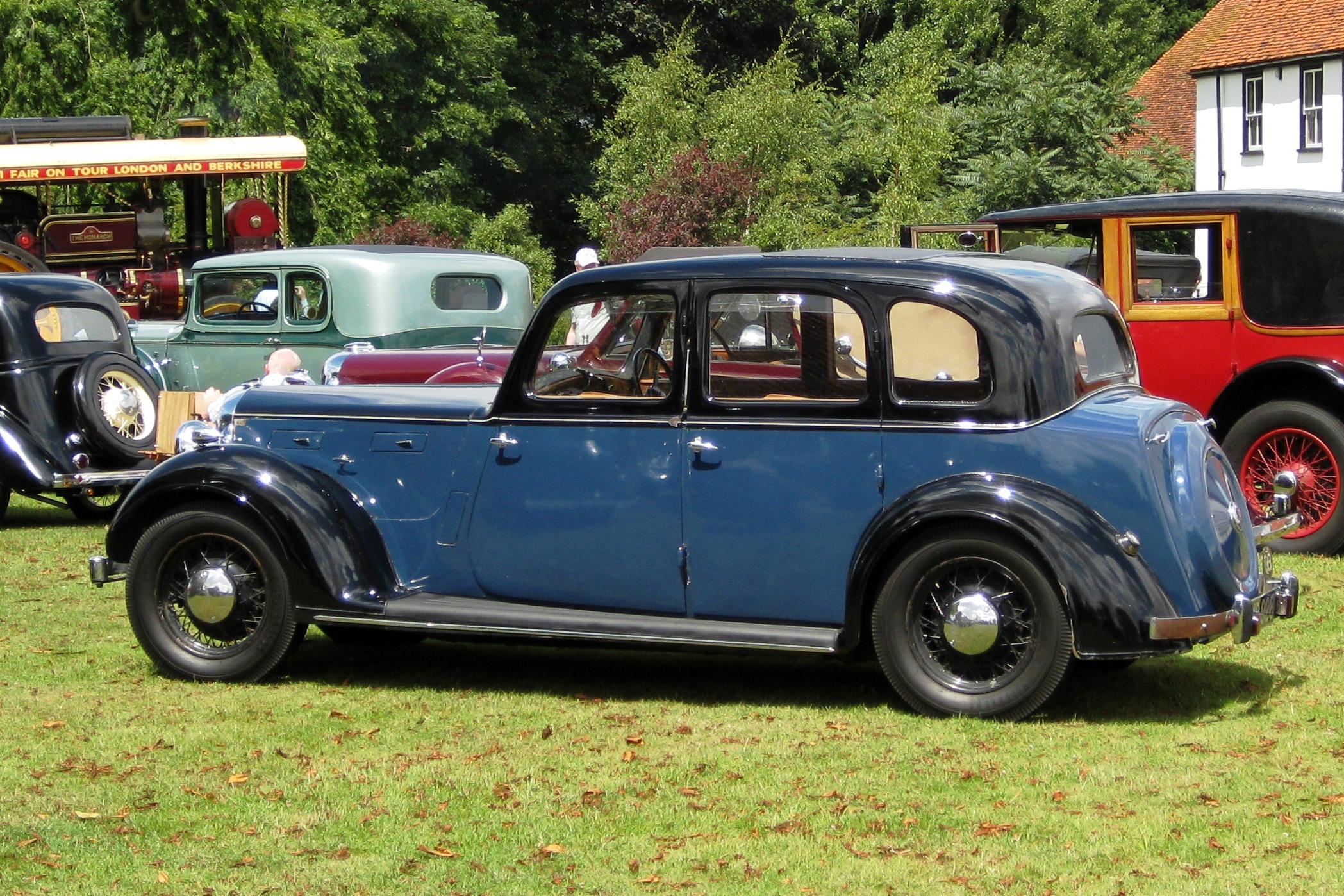
1938 Sixteen

=== Launched under the independent Rover Company pre-merger (1904–1967) ===
- 1904–1912 Rover 8
- 1906–1910 Rover 6
- 1906–1907 Rover 10/12
- 1906–1910 Rover 16
- 1906–1910 Rover 20
- 1909–1912 Rover 12 2-cylinder
- 1908–1911 Rover 15
- 1910–1912 Rover 12 sleeve-valve
- 1912–1913 Rover 18
- 1912–1923 Rover 12 Clegg
- 1919–1925 Rover 8
- 1922–1923 Rover 6/21
- 1924–1927 Rover 9/20
- 1925–1927 Rover 14/45
- 1926–1929 Rover 16/50
- 1929–1930 Rover Light Six
- 1930–1931 Rover Light Twenty
- 1927–1947 Rover 10
- 1927–1932 Rover 2-Litre
- 1932–1934 Rover Meteor 16HP/20HP
- 1931–1940 Rover Speed 20
- 1932–1933 Rover Pilot/Speed Pilot
- 1932–1932 Rover Scarab
- 1934–1947 Rover 12
- 1934–1947 Rover 14/Speed 14
- 1937–1947 Rover 16
- 1947–1948 Rover 12 Sports Tourer
- 1948–1978 Land Rover (I/II/III)—In 1978, BL established Land Rover Limited as a separate subsidiary; it took over Land Rover production.
- 1948–1949 Rover P3 (60/75)
- 1949–1964 Rover P4 (60/75/80/90/95/100/105/110)
- 1958–1973 Rover P5 (3-Litre/3.5-Litre)
- 1963–1976 Rover P6 (2000/2200/3500)

== See also ==
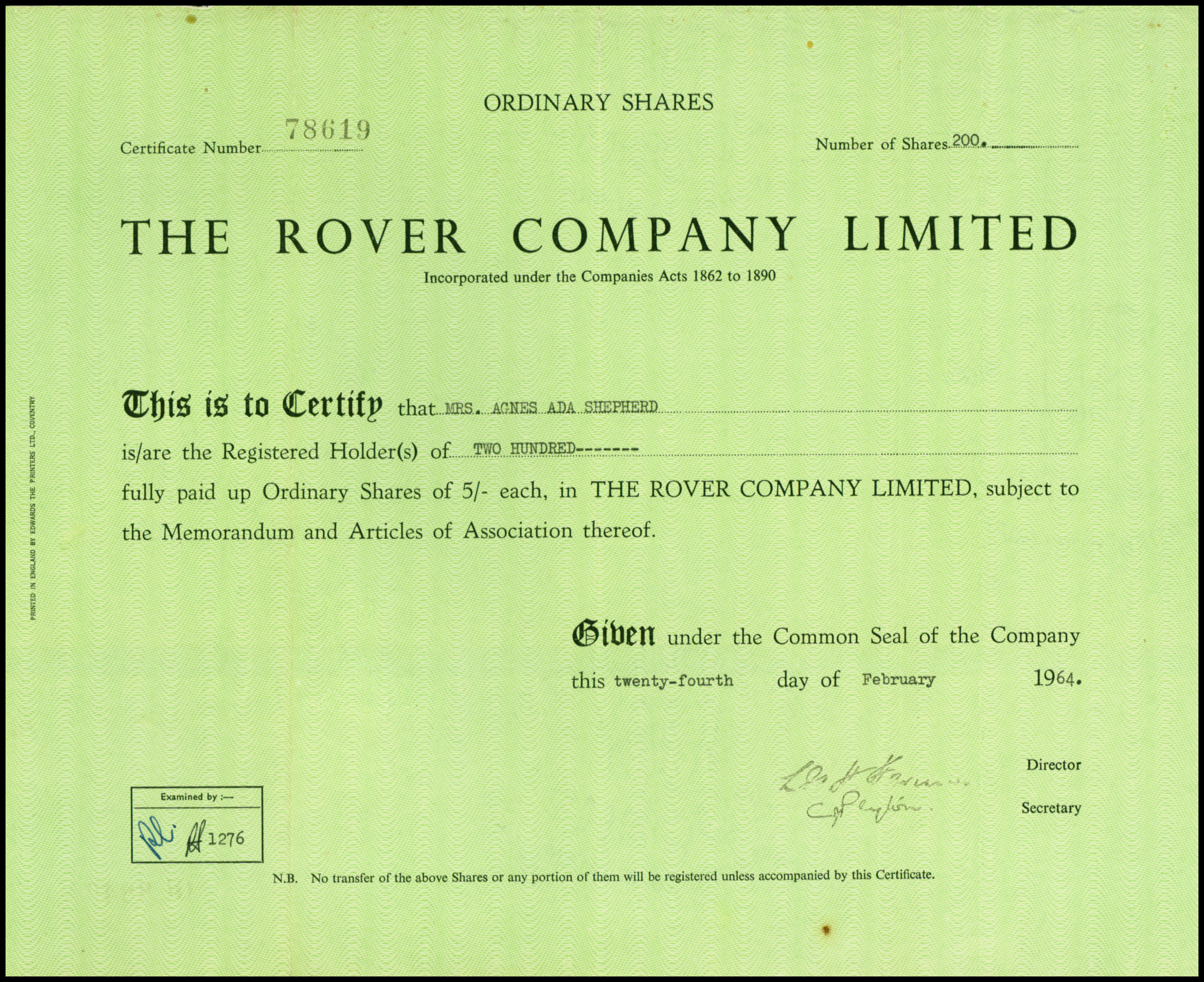
1964 Rover share certificate

- Rover (marque)
- British Leyland
- Austin Rover Group
- Rover Group
- MG Rover Group
- Land Rover
- Jaguar Land Rover
