= John Kemp Starley =

English industrialist and inventor (1855-1901)

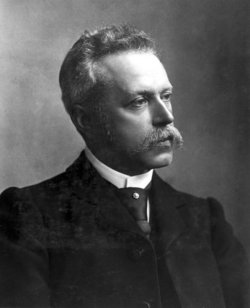
- John Kemp Starley
- Born: 24 December 1855; Walthamstow, London, England
- Died: 29 October 1901 (aged 45); Coventry, Warwickshire, England
- Occupations: Industrialist, inventor
- Years active: 1877–1901
- Known for: Owning Starley & Sutton Co

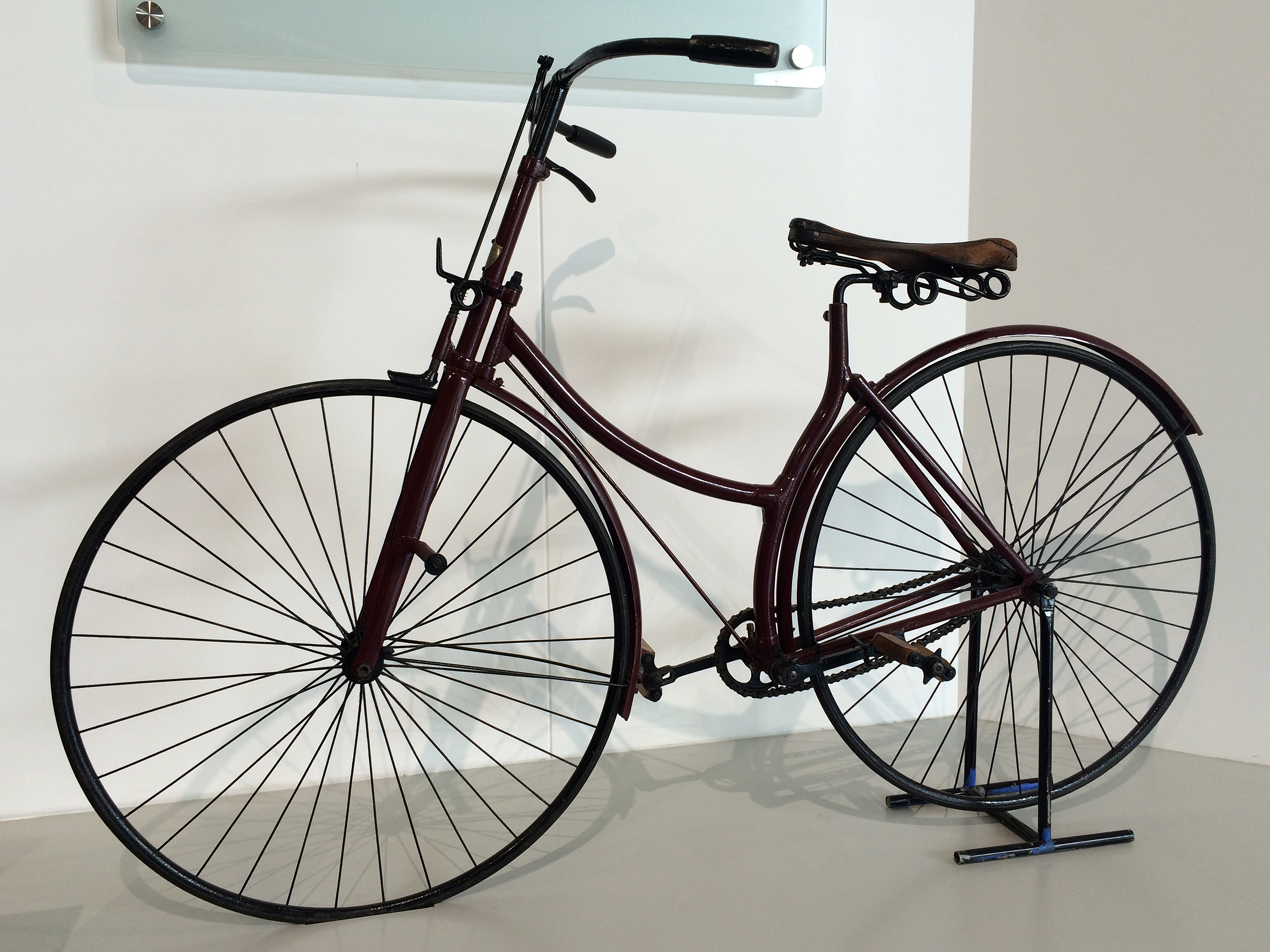
1886 Rover safety bicycle at the British Motor Museum

John Kemp Starley (24 December 1855 – 29 October 1901) was an English inventor and industrialist who is widely considered the inventor of the modern safety bicycle, and also originator of the tradename Rover.

== Early life ==
Born on 24 December 1855 Starley lived on Church Hill, Walthamstow, London, England. He was the son of a gardener, John Starley, and Mary Ann (née Coppen). In 1872, he moved to Coventry to work with his uncle James Starley, an inventor. He worked with his uncle and William Hillman for several years, building Ariel cycles.

== Career ==
In 1877, he started a new business Starley & Sutton Co with William Sutton, a local cycling enthusiast. They set about developing bicycles that were safer and easier to use than the prevailing penny-farthing or "ordinary" bicycles. They started by manufacturing tricycles, and by 1883 their products were being branded as "Rover".

In 1885, Starley made history when he produced the Rover Safety Bicycle. The Rover was a rear-wheel-drive, chain-driven cycle with two similar-sized wheels, making it more stable than the previous high wheeler designs. Cycling magazine said the Rover had "set the pattern to the world", and the phrase was used in their advertising for many years.

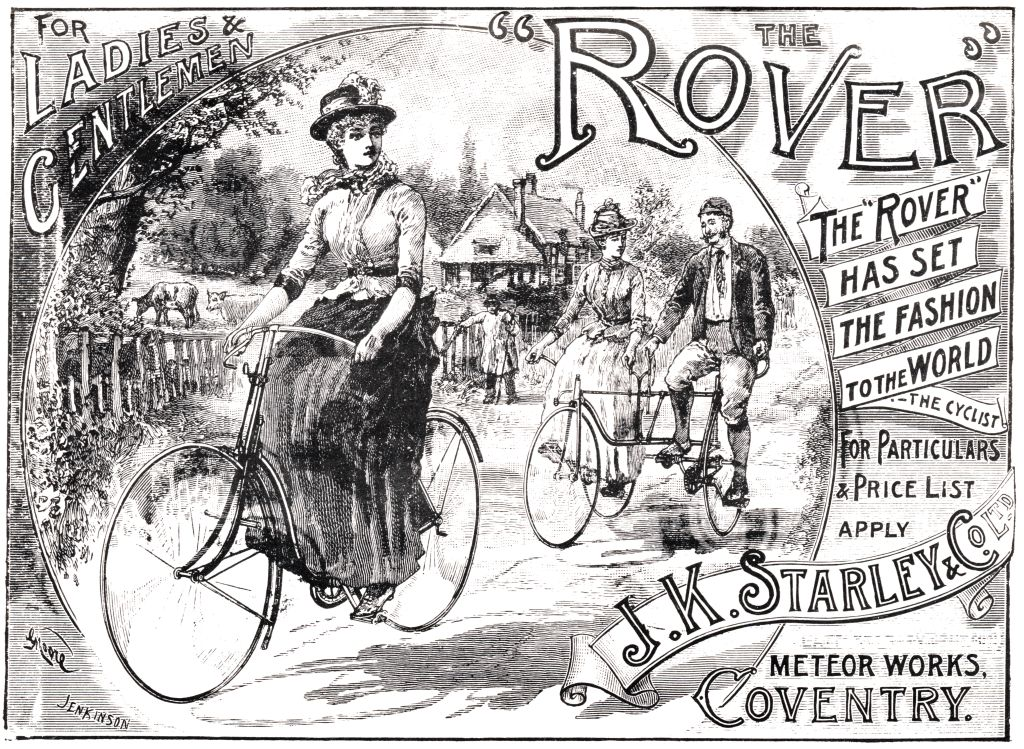
J. K. Starley & Co. Ltd advertisement

In 1889, the company became J. K. Starley & Co. Ltd and in the late 1890s, it had become the Rover Cycle Company Ltd.

== Death ==
Starley died suddenly on 29 October 1901, in Coventry, and was succeeded as managing director of the firm by Harry Smyth. Soon after Starley's death the Rover company began building motorcycles and then cars.

== See also ==
- Rover (motorcycles)
