= Rover (motorcycles) =

British bicycle and motorcycle manufacturer

The Rover Company was a British bicycle and motorcycle manufacturer before it began the manufacture of motor cars. Rover was established in 1878 by John Kemp Starley in Coventry to produce bicycles. The company developed and produced the Rover Imperial motorcycle in November 1902. Between 1903 and 1924, Rover produced more than 10,000 motorcycles.

== History ==
In June 1896 John Starley formed the Rover Cycle Co. Ltd. in Coventry. Starley had become successful making 'safety bicycles' and used the money to import some of the early Peugeot motorcycles from France in 1899 for experimental development. His first project was to fit an engine onto one of his Rover bicycles. However, Starley died early in October 1901 aged 46 and the business was taken over by entrepreneur Harry Lawson.

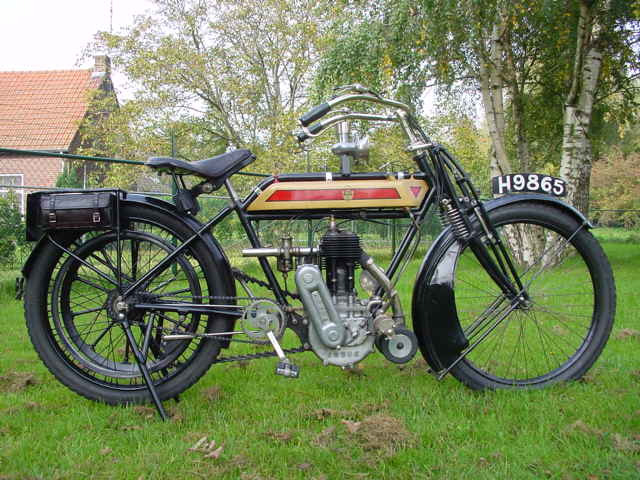
1912 Rover 3-speed

The company began to develop and produced the Rover Imperial motorcycle in November 1902. This was a 3.5 hp diamond-framed motorcycle with the engine in the centre and 'springer' front forks, an improvement ahead of its time. This first Rover motorcycle had innovative features such as a spray carburettor, a bottom-bracket engine, and mechanically operated valves. Featuring a strong frame with double front down tubes and a good quality finish, over a thousand Rover motorcycles were sold in 1904. The following year, however, Rover stopped motorcycle production to concentrate on their 'safety bicycle'. In 1910, designer John Greenwood was commissioned to develop a new 3.5 hp 500cc engine with spring-loaded tappets, a Bosch magneto, and a Brown and Barlow carburettor. This new model, also featuring an innovative inverted tooth drive chain and "Druid" spring forks, was launched at the 1910 Olympia show, and over 500 models were sold.

== Racing success ==
In 1913, a 'TT' model was launched with a shorter wheelbase and sports handlebars. The 'works team' of Dudley Noble and Chris Newsome had some success with this model and won the works team award.

== Production after the First World War ==
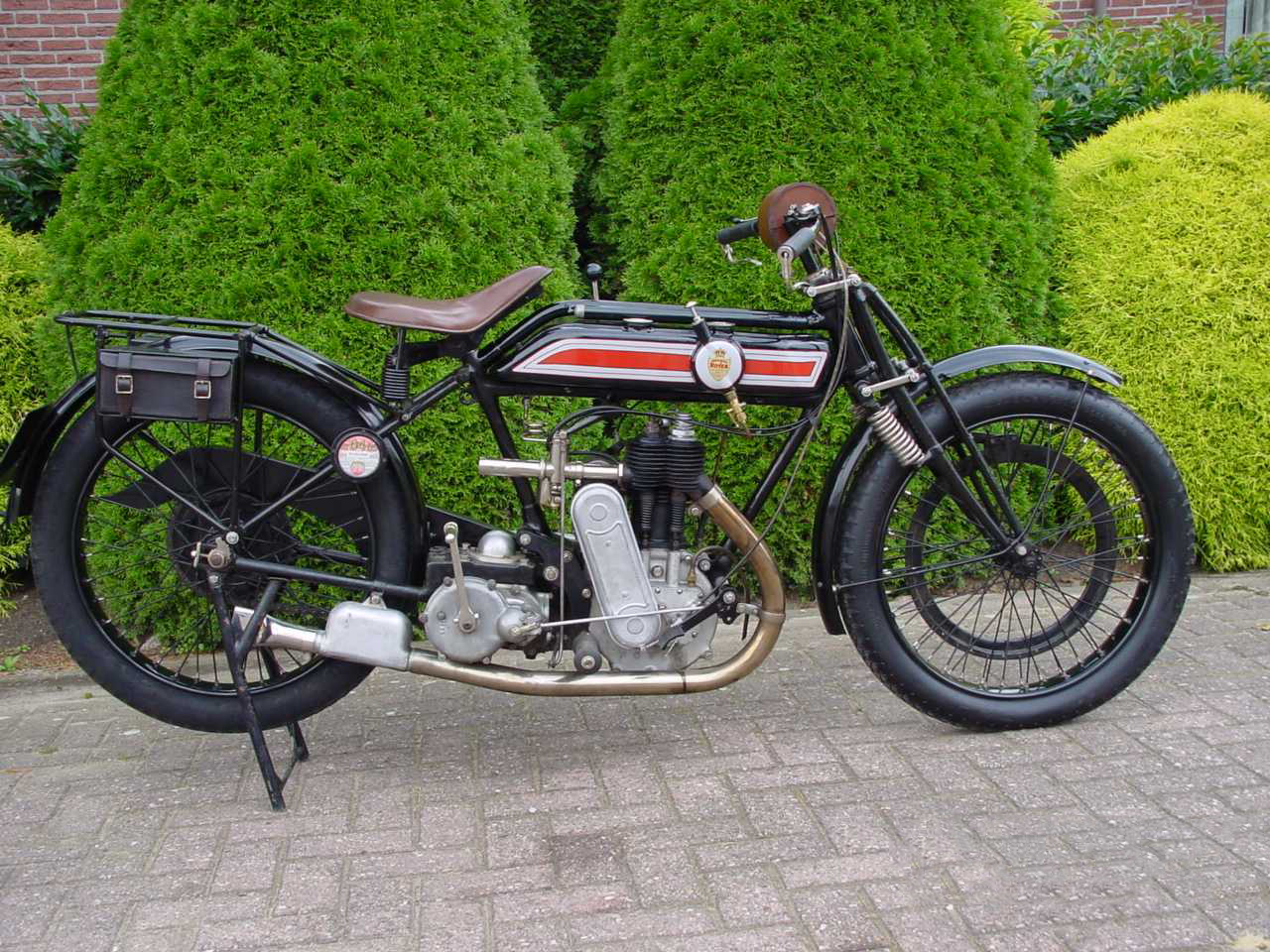
1920 Rover 500cc

Rover supplied 499cc single cylinder motorcycles to the Russian Army during the First World War. When the war ended, the company began to focus on car production, yet Rover still produced motorcycles with 248cc and 348cc Rover overhead valve engines and J.A.P. engines, including a 676cc V-Twin. In 1924, Rover led the way with the unit construction of the engine and gearbox on a new lightweight 250cc motorcycle. This had lights on the front and rear as well as a new design of internal expanding brakes. Following poor sales, Rover ceased to produce both bicycles and motorcycles. Between 1903 and 1924 Rover had produced more than 10,000 motorcycles.

== See also ==
- List of motorcycles of the 1910s
- List of motorcycles of the 1920s
