= Rover 6 =

Rover 6 hp
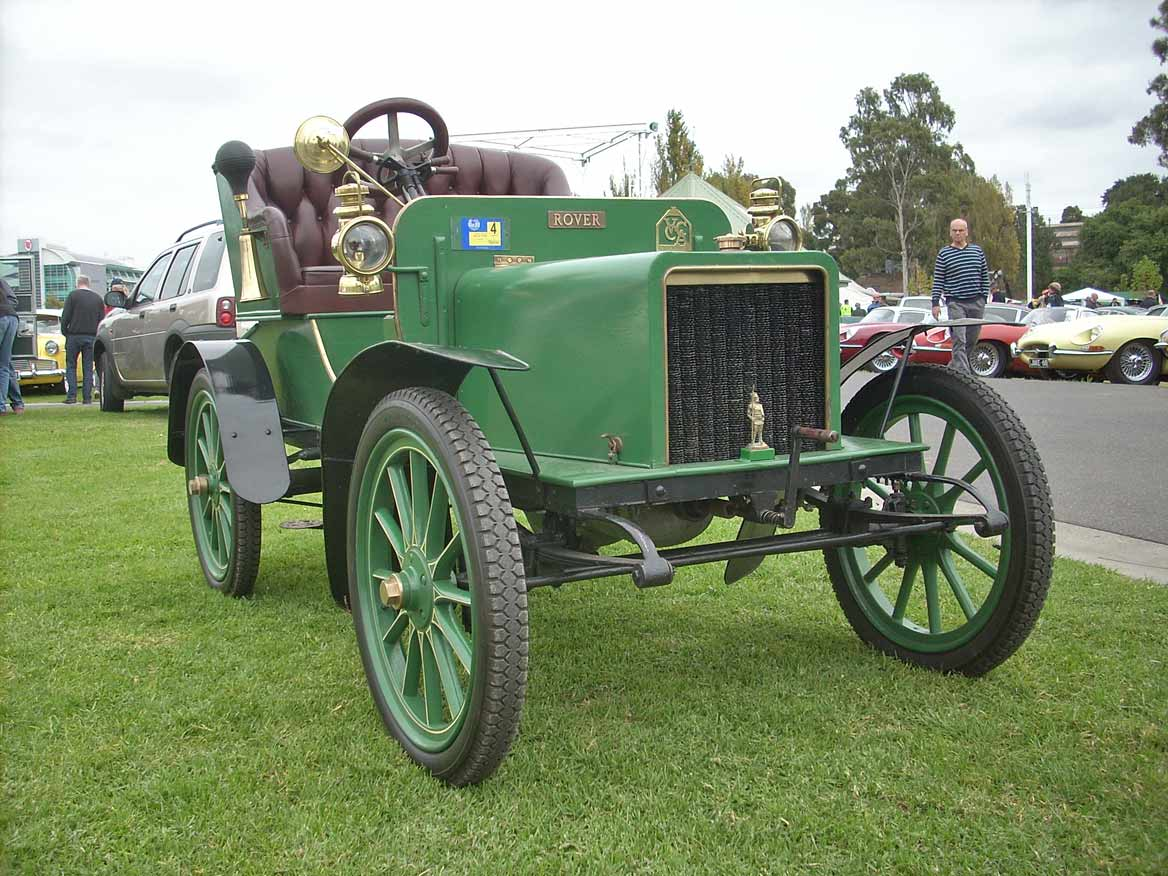
- 1905 open 2-seater

Overview
- Manufacturer: Rover
- Production: 1905–1912
- Designer: Edmund Woodward Lewis

Powertrain
- Engine: 780 or 812 cc single-cylinder
- Transmission: 3-speeds

Dimensions
- Wheelbase: 72 in (1,829 mm); Track 48 in (1,219 mm)
- Length: 111 in (2,819 mm)
- Width: 48 in (1,219 mm)
- Kerb weight: 6 cwt, 672 lb (305 kg)

Layout
- Configuration: single-cylinder
- Displacement: 780 cc (47.6 cu in); 810 cc (49.4 cu in)
- Cylinder bore: 95 mm (3.7 in); 97 mm (3.8 in)
- Piston stroke: 110 mm (4.3 in)
- Valvetrain: mechanically operated

Combustion
- Fuel system: Rover (pat.) carburettor
- Management: High Tension ignition
- Fuel type: petrol
- Cooling system: water, circulation by pump, radiator

Output
- Power output: 1 bhp (0.75 kW; 1.0 PS) @2,400 rpm; Tax horsepower 3.74; 3.82

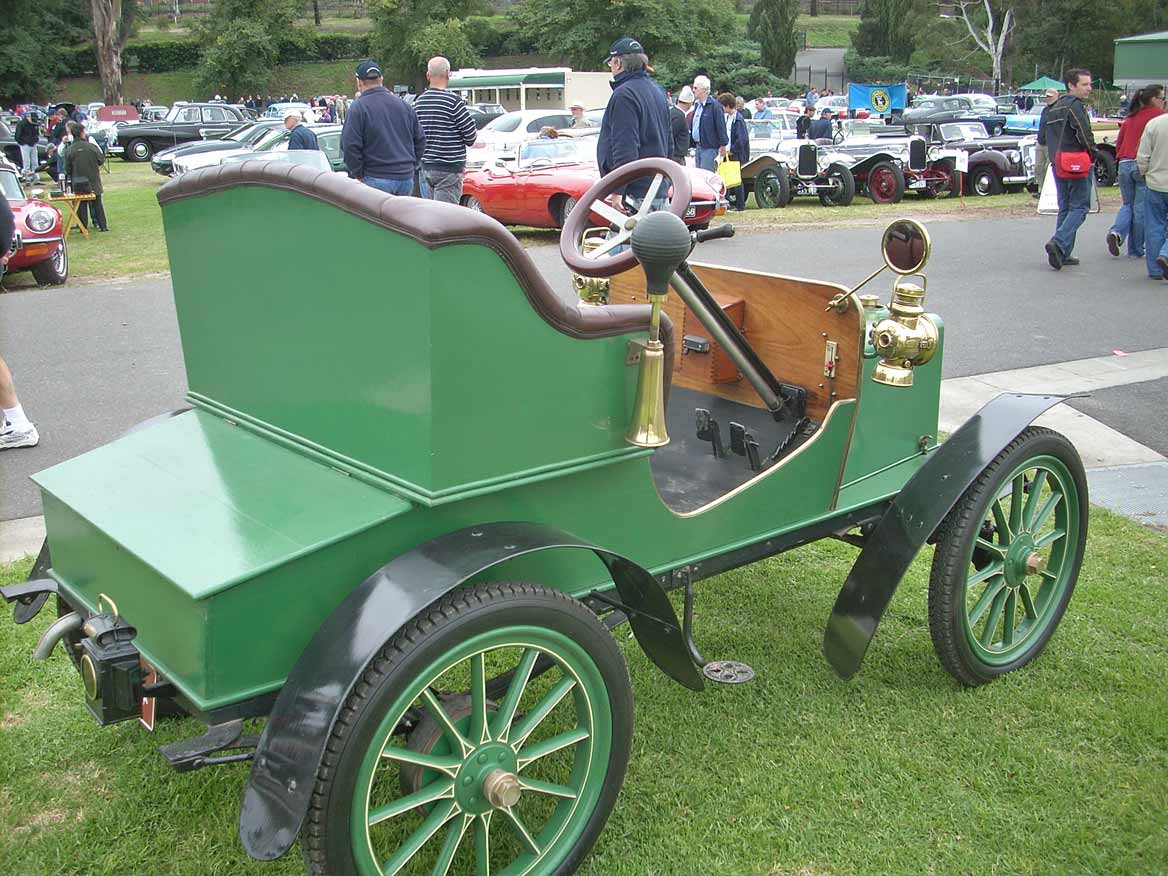
rear view

The Rover 6 was a small two-seater 6-horsepower car and only the second car model made by the British Rover car company. Announced in January 1905 a 6-horsepower car remained available from Rover until 1912.

== Engine ==
The engine was a 780 cc side-valve, single-cylinder unit, water-cooled, with a bore of 95 mm and stroke of 110 mm. The capacity increased to 812 cc in 1908 when the bore was increased to 97 mm to bring dimensions into line with Rover's new range of four-cylinder cars.

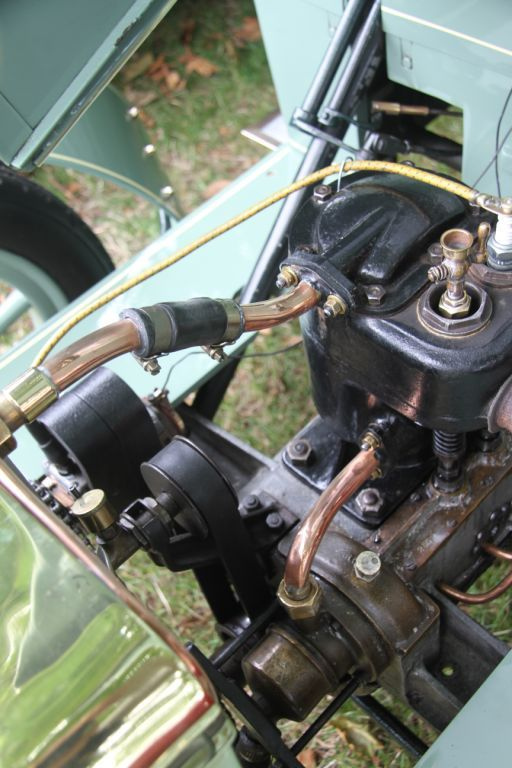
single-cylinder engine

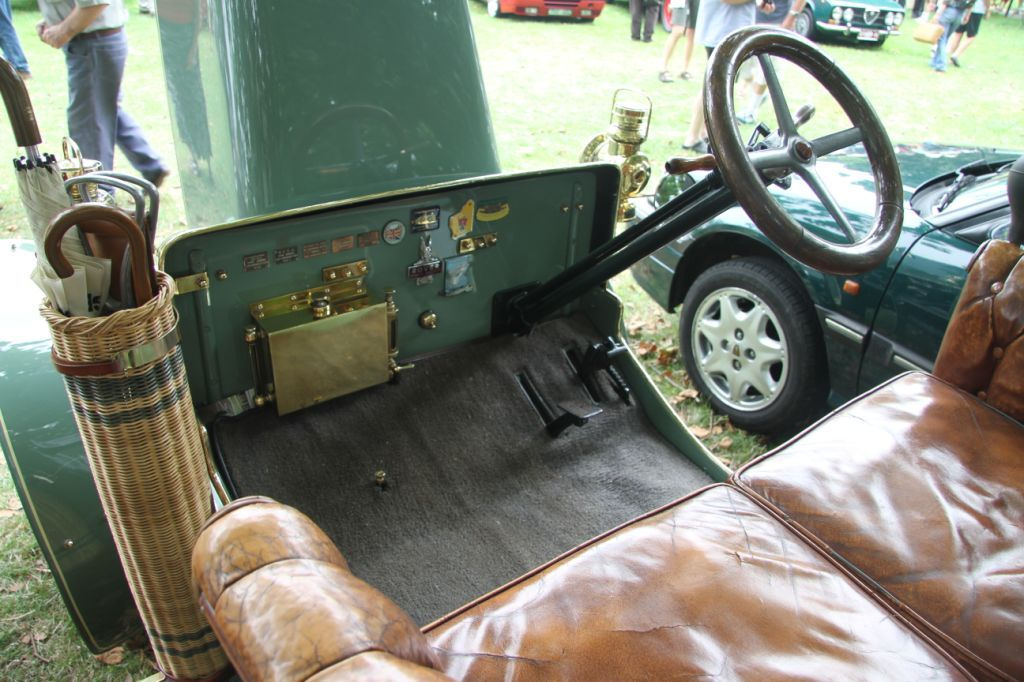
controls and instrument panel change speed lever on steering column

The engine's normal speed was 1200 rpm. Selection of top, middle or low gear provided speeds of 24 mph, 16 mph and 8 mph respectively. The change speed lever mounted in a notched quadrant below the steering wheel is linked by a connecting rod to a vertical spindle in the gearbox. Ignition was by High-Tension current from the Bosch magneto, low tension accumulator ignition was also provided. The crankcase, flywheel and clutch and gearbox enclosures are made up of one pair of aluminium castings. The upper half is bolted directly to the frame at the front and at the rear is bolted to a thin steel cross-member.

The clutch runs in oil and uses the metal to metal gripping disc system of the 8 hp car. Drive was taken to the rear wheels through a three-speed gearbox, light but very similar to the earlier car, and jointed drive shaft. The brake drum at the back of the gearbox surrounds the universal joint, the rear axle casing extends forward to almost the universal joint. There is a bevel wheel in the differential case.

The engine's throttle is operated by a lever below the steering wheel. The same lever simultaneously controls the ignition timing. Petrol is in a tank beneath the driver's seat.

== Chassis ==
This new smaller car employed a conventional steel reinforced (with flitch plates) wooden chassis with half elliptic leaf springs front and rear supporting the car on rigid axles. The forward end of the springs are fixed rigidly to the chassis frame, the rear ends slide within brackets.

The right pedal applies iron-lined external bands on the rear brake drums through levers and horizontal shafts. The left pedal first releases the clutch then when moved further the same pedal to ease the gear change applies the brake on the propeller shaft drum behind the gearbox. Steering is by rack and pinion. Wheels are of steel wire with tangent spokes.

== Road test ==
The test car was finished in dark green and black with matching pegamoid upholstery. The seat was removable and the footboards and rear platform were covered with green cork lino.

They drove the car three hundred miles then Autocar's testers said: the single wide seat was capable of carrying two people with every comfort and the car looked fit to take anywhere. Control was so simple a child could drive it. Change speed was a little stiff. Would prefer separate control for the spark (ignition). Steering excellent. Two involuntary stops: an air valve stuck while climbing a hill and the trembler on the coil stuck. They declared the little Rover an "Ideal car for a man of very moderate means".

== Revision May 1909 ==
This car now has the same Rover patented carburettor as their 8 hp car. The change speed lever is now in an exterior quadrant near the driver's right hand instead of beneath the steering wheel. The universal joint to the propeller shaft has been redesigned and the propeller shaft's casing now acts as a torque rod. The brake on the back of the gearbox which is controlled by the clutch is now very much larger. There are now separate levers for throttle and ignition timing. The front springs now have shackle pins. A fan has been added to the engine cooling system. Petrol is now carried on the dashboard. There is a pawl below the brake pedal so it can be used to brake the car on a slope.

In 1910 a complete Rover 6 with two-seater body and weather protection cost GBP155 but an earlier model had been sold as a "hundred guinea car" (GBP105).
