= Rover Scarab =

The Rover Scarab was a convertible four seater intended to sell at £85, and had a V-twin engine of only 839 cc, which was rear mounted. Despite the engine position, the Scarab had a conventional (dummy) radiator grille at the front. Some other 1930s rear engined cars had a down-curved grille-less front. These included the Porsche Type 12 prototype, the Mercedes-Benz 120 test car, and the subsequent 130 / 150 / 170 H, the Tatra V570 prototype, T77, 77A, T87 and T97, and the KdF-Wagen (later better known as the Volkswagen Beetle). Only a few Scarabs were built, examples being shown at the London (Olympia) Motor Show and the Scottish Motor Show, both in 1931.
