= Sports sedan =

Subjective term for a sedan car that is designed to have sporting performance

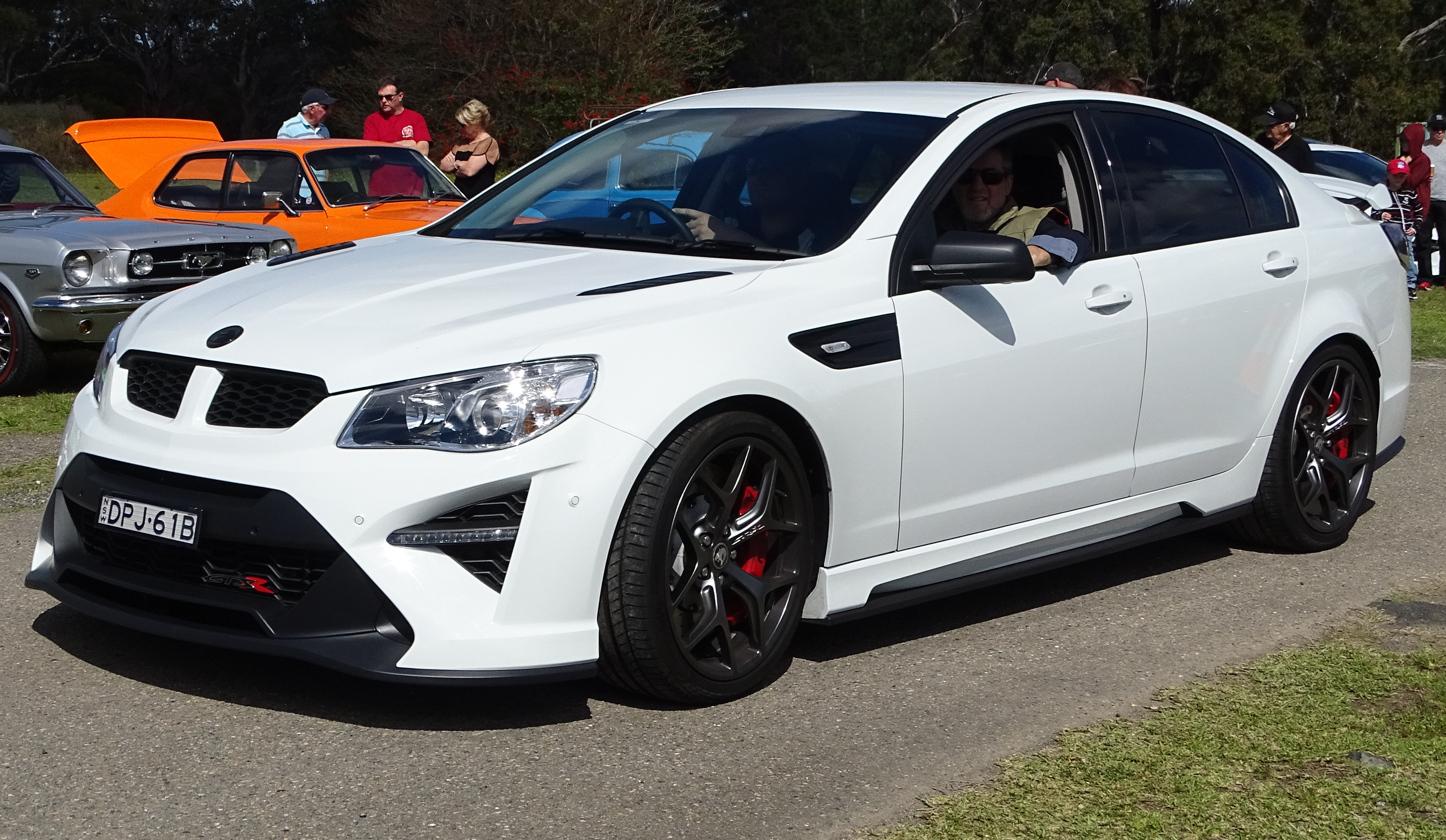
HSV GTS-R

A sports sedan (also known as a super saloon or sports saloon in British English) is a subjective term for a sedan car that is designed to have sporting performance or handling characteristics.

== History ==
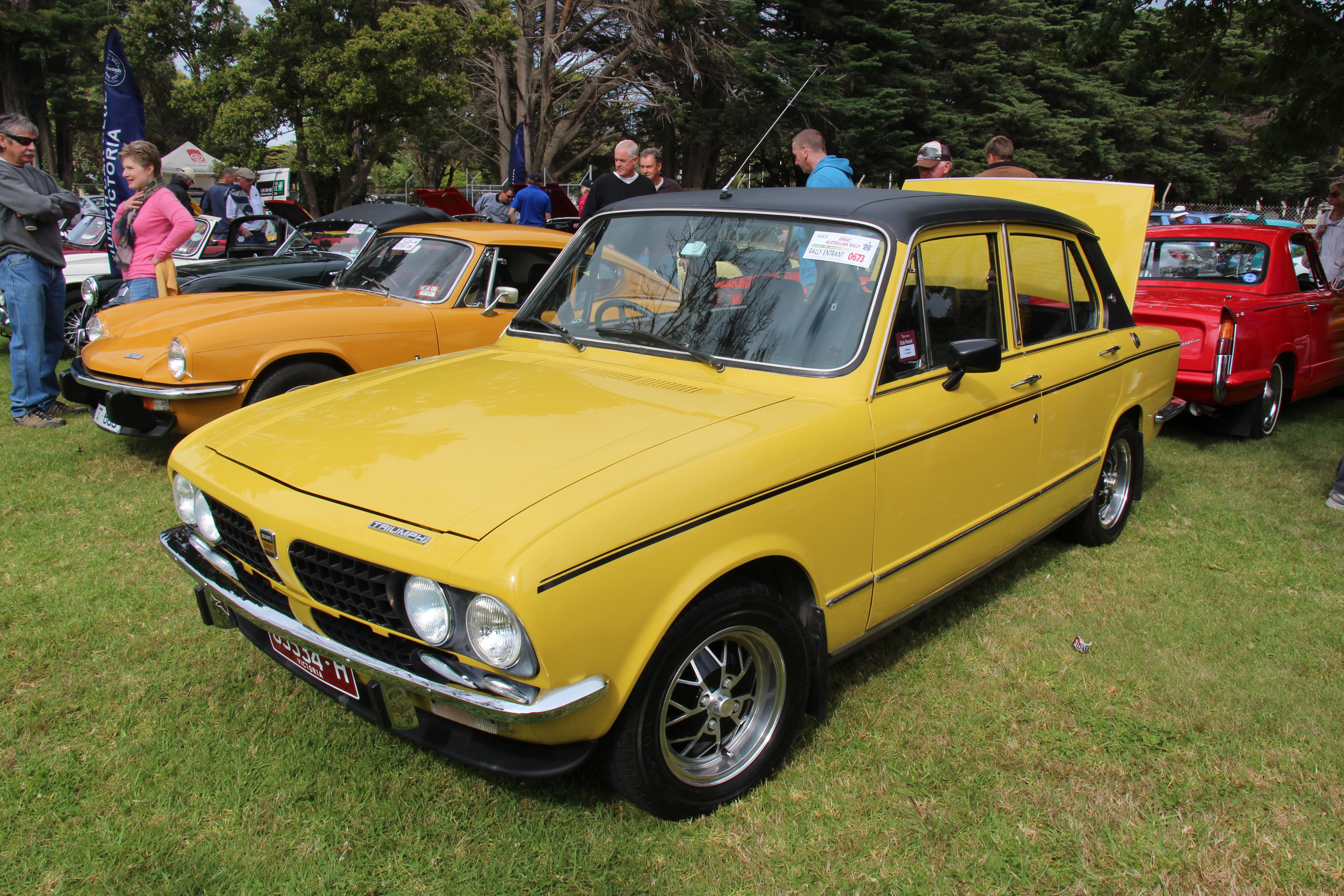
Triumph Dolomite Sprint

The term was initially introduced in the 1930s. Early examples include the Sports Saloon versions of the Rover 14 and Rover 16.

From the 1960s, the term sports sedan was increasingly applied by manufacturers to special versions of their vehicles that allowed them to enter production cars in motor races. These cars contained modifications not usually permitted by the regulations, which therefore required cars to be homologated typically by selling them in minimum numbers to the public. Some of the earlier examples were the Alfa Romeo 1900, Renault R8 Gordini, Triumph Dolomite, Lotus Cortina, and BMW 1800 TI.

By the 1980s, the sports sedan was described by Popular Mechanics magazine as being "well-made five-passenger cars that are modest in size, appearance, and appetite for fuel, yet can outperform all but the fastest two-seater cars". Invented in Europe, the U.S. market share of these types of models had grown from 50,000 units per year in 1975, to 500,000 in 1985.

== Characteristics ==
In the twentieth century, most sports sedans used manual transmissions and rear-wheel drive configurations. However, with other transmission types and drivetrain layouts have become more widespread for sedans in general, and increasing adoption of front-wheel drive and all-wheel drive in motorsports such as touring car racing and World Rally Championship, many sports sedans such as Mitsubishi Lancer Evolution have also used these.

While many sports sedans use notchback designs as their default body configurations, fastback and liftback variations are not unheard of, with some smaller hot hatches with three-box or liftback designs crossing into this territory. Some manufacturers share similar engines and interior features as sports sedans in coupe and convertible body styles; therefore, some rankings of this market segment include those versions.

== North American usage ==
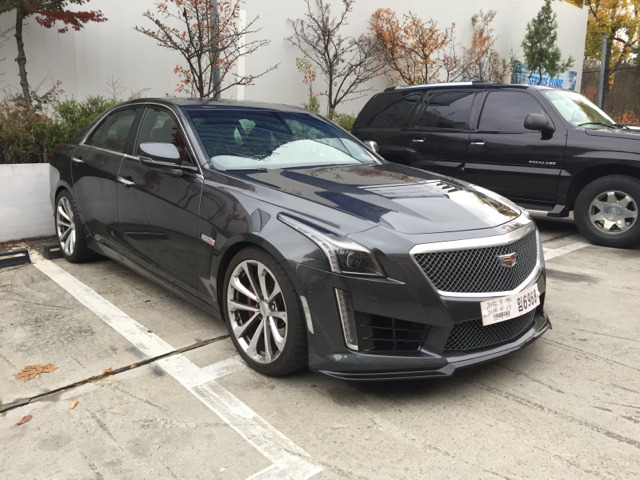
2016 Cadillac CTS-V

The term "sport sedan" was initially used in North America for luxury import sedans (i.e., BMW, Audi, and Mercedes-Benz). These cars often prioritized handling more than domestic luxury sedans (i.e., Cadillac and Lincoln), which were more focused on comfort. However, since the 2000s, domestic brands have begun producing more sports sedan models such as the Cadillac CTS-V, Lincoln LS, and Dodge Charger SRT8.

Another term sometimes used to describe sports sedans in the US is muscle car; however, more typically, the latter term refers to V8-powered two-door coupes made by American manufacturers.

== Examples ==
- Alfa Romeo Giulia Quadrifoglio (2017)
- Audi RS 4
- BMW M5
- Cadillac CTS-V
- Chrysler 300M
- Dodge Charger SRT8
- Ford Taurus SHO
- Jaguar XJ
- Kia Stinger
- Maserati Quattroporte
- Mercedes-Benz C63 AMG
- MG ZS 180
- HSV Clubsport
- Honda Civic Si
