= Rover Meteor =

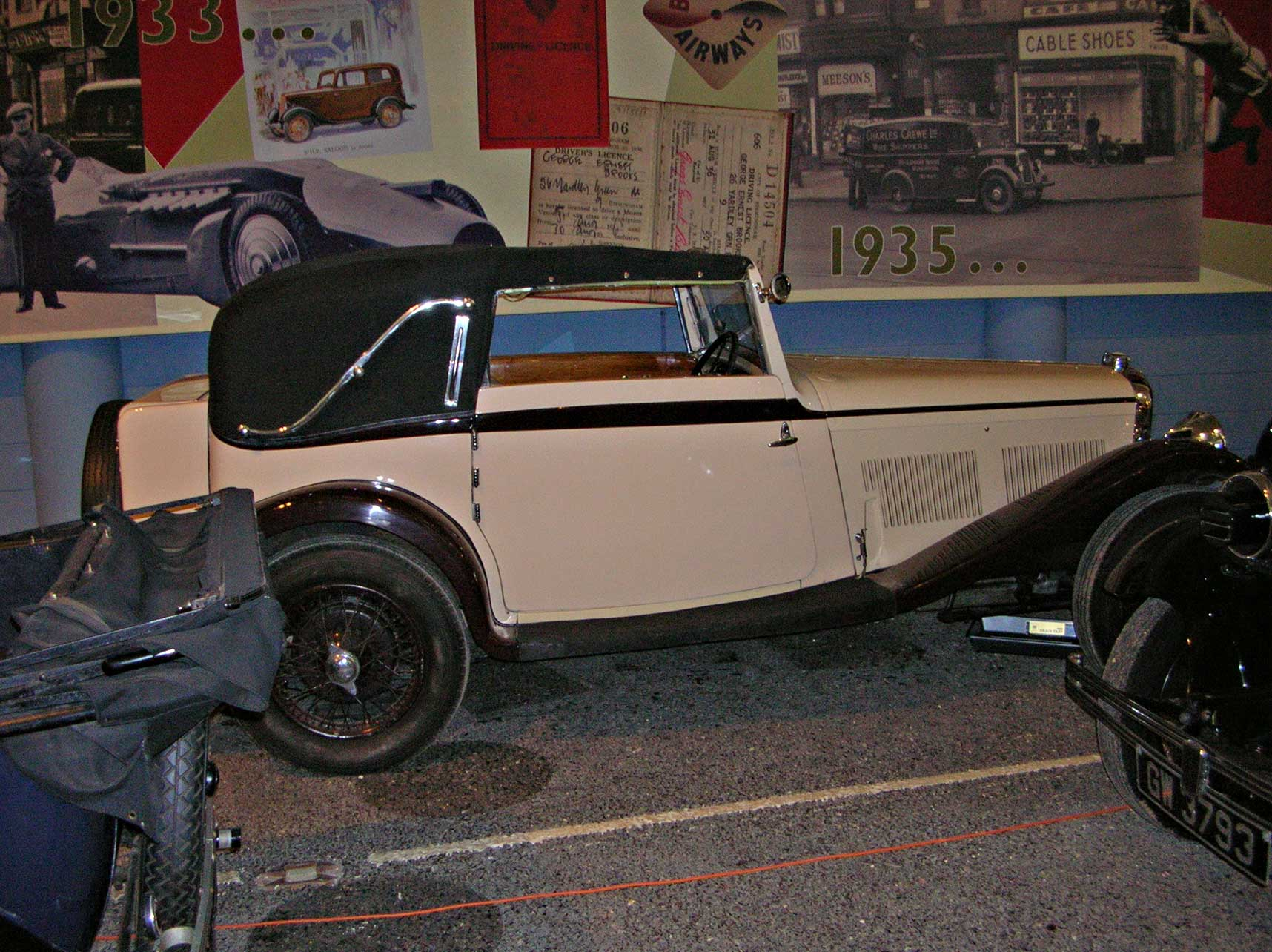
- Corsica drophead coupé body on a Meteor chassis

Overview
- Manufacturer: Rover
- Model years: 1931 to 1934

Body and chassis
- Class: medium-size
- Body style: saloon (coachbuilt); Weymann saloon; sportsman's Weymann saloon; seven-seater limousine; chassis for special coachwork
- Layout: front engine rear wheel drive
- Related: Rover Two-litre

Powertrain
- Engine: straight-six pushrod ohv 2,565 cc (156.5 cu in)
- Transmission: 1. two-plate cork insert clutch, 4-speed gearbox silent third, enclosed propeller shaft with central bearing, spiral bevel drive to half-floating back axle 2. automatic clutch, freewheel, automatic engine starting 1933—>

Dimensions
- Wheelbase: 118 in (2,997 mm); 112 in (2,845 mm) speed models; 130 in (3,302 mm) lwb limousine; Track 56.5 in (1,435 mm) option 51 in (1,295 mm) on speed models
- Length: depends on body; 163 in (4,140 mm) speed model
- Width: not available; 66 in (1,676 mm)
- Height: depends on body
- Kerb weight: depends on body

Chronology
- Predecessor: Rover Light Twenty; Rover Light Six
- Successor: Rover 16

Rover Meteor

Layout
- Configuration: straight-six pushrod ohv
- Displacement: 2,565 cc (156.5 cu in)—20; 2,023 cc (123.5 cu in)—16
- Cylinder bore: 72 mm (2.8 in)—20; 65 mm (2.6 in)—16
- Piston stroke: 105 mm (4.1 in)—20; 101.6 mm (4.0 in)—16
- Cylinder block material: cast iron
- Cylinder head material: cast iron detachable
- Valvetrain: overhead valves, pushrods, double springs

Combustion
- Fuel system: carburettor with acceleration pump, petrol pump driven from camshaft, 12-gallon tank at back
- Management: distributor driven from camshaft
- Fuel type: petrol
- Cooling system: honeycomb radiator in a shell with stone-guard, fan and water impeller driven from crankshaft, thermostat

Output
- Power output: 60 bhp (45 kW; 61 PS) @3,600 rpm; Tax horsepower 19.28

Chronology
- Successor: Rover 16

The Rover Meteor was a short-lived 2½-litre or 2-litre medium-sized car made by The Rover Company Limited of Meteor Works Coventry. The new 2½-litre model was announced in mid-February 1930 to supplement Rover's Light Twenty which used the same engine and essentially the same chassis.

A 2-litre car, a further variant of Rover's Light Twenty was announced in July 1932. Under fiscal rating it was a 16-horsepower car and it was renamed Rover Speed Sixteen in mid-1934 but under either name was out of production before April 1935.

The first Meteor was announced a few months into the depression. It is difficult to establish whether models remained in the catalogue from continuing production or they were unsold stock. However it should be remembered it was in this period Rover returned to profit.

The name Meteor was abandoned during 1934, the products remaining in Rover's catalogue as Rover Sixteen (a four-door saloon) and Rover Speed Twenty (a four-seater sports tourer), and in due course they were replaced in the summer of 1936 by the new designs now referred to as P2.

== Meteor ==
The Meteor was a more luxurious, better equipped version of the Light Twenty and considerably more expensive.

=== Bodywork ===
The two-door sportsman's Weymann saloon was a comfortable 4-seater and two-thirds of the roof could be folded back. The safety glass windscreen could be opened to avoid turbulence and allow an unobstructed view in poor weather. Instruments included a fuel gauge and water temperature gauge. A cupboard was fitted either side of the instruments. There was a scuttle ventilator, two interior lights and ashtrays for all seats. Rear passengers were given an arm roll either side. The doors were very wide and the front seats could slide and had hinged backrests. A small part of the front section of the window in each door could be wound down out of sight with a quick action handle. There were tools under the front cushions and a spare wheel and tyre in a well on the left hand side front mudguard A coachbuilt saloon was also available and a seven-seated coachbuilt limousine de luxe. A range of specialised bodies by leading coach builders remained available.

For 1932 new lines were added to the coachwork.

In mid-1932 the new models for 1933 displayed new sound proofing and insulation giving quietness that became a Rover hallmark. These cars also received what also became a Rover hallmark, a combined oil level and petrol gauge. Large headlamps were now supplied which employed a dip and switch device.

=== Engine and transmission ===
The engine ran in four main bearings and had a Lanchester vibration damper at its front end as employed by USA's Hudson and Studebaker and Vauxhall's 23-60.

Improvements for 1932 were: a crankcase breather to prevent fumes entering the car, a new silencer, modified springs and shock absorbers, larger wheels. and Bohnalite alloy pistons.

A supplementary 2-litre version was announced 21 July 1932 it used the 2023 cc 6-cylinder overhead-valve engine of the Rover Light Six in the same body.

Standard equipment was now extensive: automatic clutch, freewheel, automatic engine starting

=== Brakes suspension steering ===
Steering was by cam and lever with the box mounted on the car's frame. From 1932 the brake vacuum servo motor was run from the car's gearbox. Brakes were on all four wheels and operated by rods, drums were enclosed. The front brakes used the Perrott principle. The central hand lever used the same brake shoes at the back as the foot brake. Springs were semi-elliptical and flat with gaiters and shock absorbers. The rear springs were outside the frame.

For 1932 there was improved springing. and the next year self-energised Bendix brakes. (i.e. servo-assistance)

== Road test, Twenty sportsman's saloon ==
The tester from The Times said the car travels fast with little fuss but the clutch and change-speed operations were "not outstanding in merit". The suspension allowed too much fore and aft rocking movement.

== Speed Meteor ==
A Speed Meteor Twenty version was announced 21 July 1932. The compression ratio was increased to 6.8 : 1, a downdraught carburettor fitted and an extra large exhaust pipe with special Pullswell silencer. Although a choice of bodywork was available this was a special sports 4-seater with air cushions (for the seats) stone guards for lamps, remote gear change control, extra large faces on the speedometer and revolution counter and Rudge-Whitworth special wire wheels. This Speed model was fitted with a single-plate clutch, 4-speed gearbox with quiet third gear and a central remote control.

== Rover Sixteen and Rover Speed Twenty ==
In September 1933 the Meteor Sixteen and Speed Twenty models remained available for 1934 but the name Meteor was abandoned during 1934 and the cars became Rover Sixteen and Rover Speed Twenty.

The Speed Twenty alone remained available for 1935 with its high compression engine and streamlined ports and manifolds. It was only available as an open four-seater on the same chassis as the Speed Fourteen but the short 112 inch wheelbase.

There was no mention of a Speed Twenty for 1936.

== Chassis only ==
Rover's description of items included with the purchase of a chassis for bespoke bodywork: chassis complete with lighting and starting equipment, horn, speedometer, clock, bonnet, front wings, step boards, luggage grid, number plates, shock absorbers, wire wheels, spare wheel and tyre tool kit.
