= Rover Light Six =

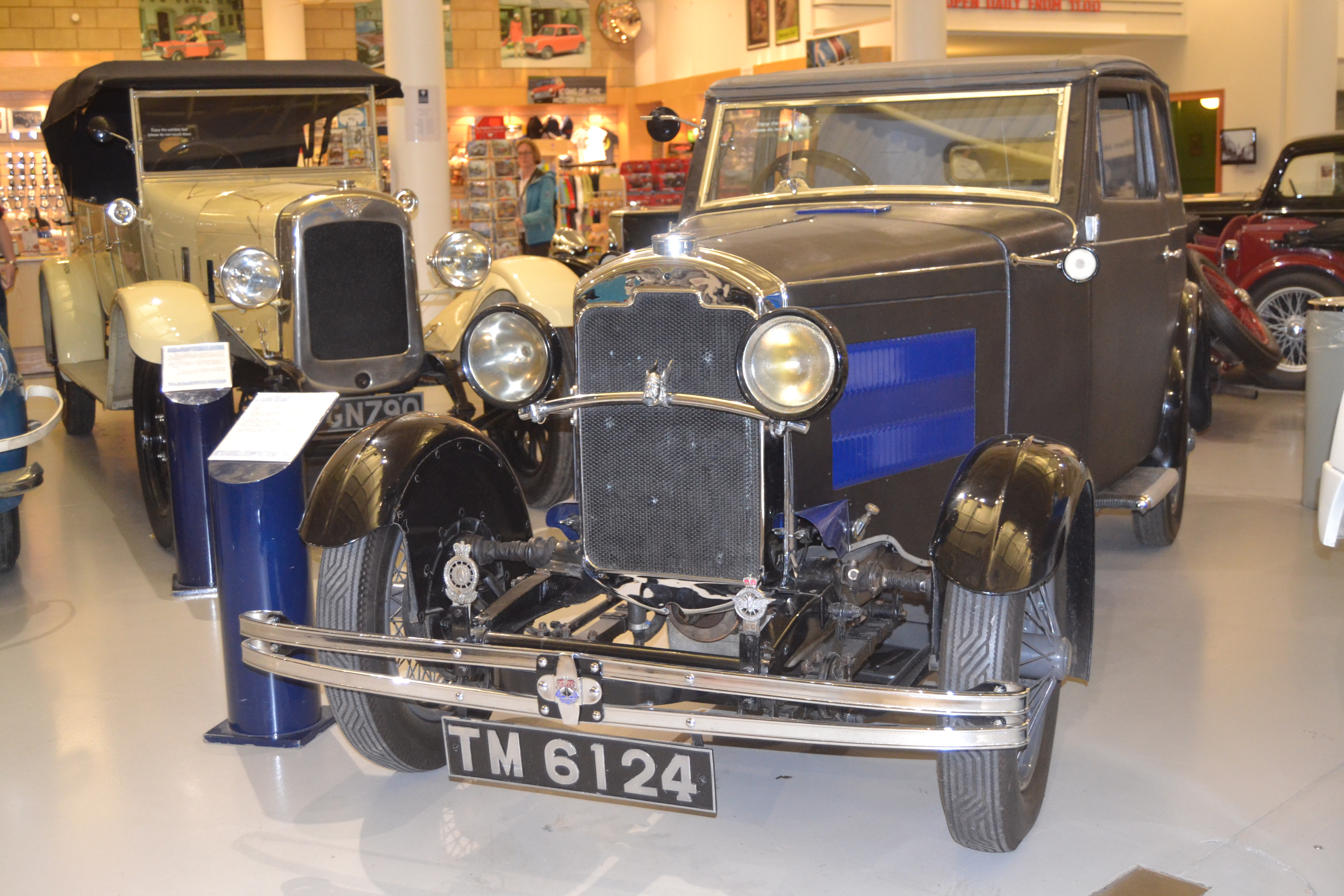
- Rover swb Light Six sportsman's saloon genuine Weymann body available in standard or Regal trim its cycle mudguards were the height of fashion

Overview
- Manufacturer: Rover

Body and chassis
- Class: Midsize car
- Body style: sportsman's saloon

Powertrain
- Engine: 2,023 cc (123.5 cu in) straight-6
- Transmission: 3-plate clutch with cork inserts. three speed gearbox controlled by central lever, enclosed propeller shaft - bearing midway in torque tube, spiral bevel final drive, half-floating axle.

Dimensions
- Wheelbase: 106 in (2,692 mm); track 50 in (1,270 mm)
- Length: 159 in (4,039 mm)
- Width: 63 in (1,600 mm)
- Height: 66 in (1,676 mm)
- Kerb weight: 26 cwt, 2,912 lb (1,321 kg)

Rover 2-litre

Overview
- Manufacturer: Rover

Layout
- Configuration: straight-six pushrod ohv
- Displacement: 2,023 cc (123 cu in)
- Cylinder bore: 65 mm (2.6 in)
- Piston stroke: 101.6 mm (4.00 in)
- Cylinder block material: cast iron
- Cylinder head material: cast iron detachable
- Valvetrain: overhead valves, pushrods, single springs, camshaft in crankcase silent chain drive

Combustion
- Fuel system: twin carburettors, vacuum feed, 12-gallon tank at back
- Management: distributor driven from camshaft
- Fuel type: petrol
- Oil system: there is pressure lubrication to every engine bearing. clutch and gearbox share oil with engine
- Cooling system: honeycomb radiator in a shell with stone-guard, fan and water impeller driven from crankshaft, thermostat

Output
- Power output: 45 bhp (34 kW; 46 PS) @3,600 rpm; Tax horsepower 15.7

Chronology
- Successor: Rover Light Twenty

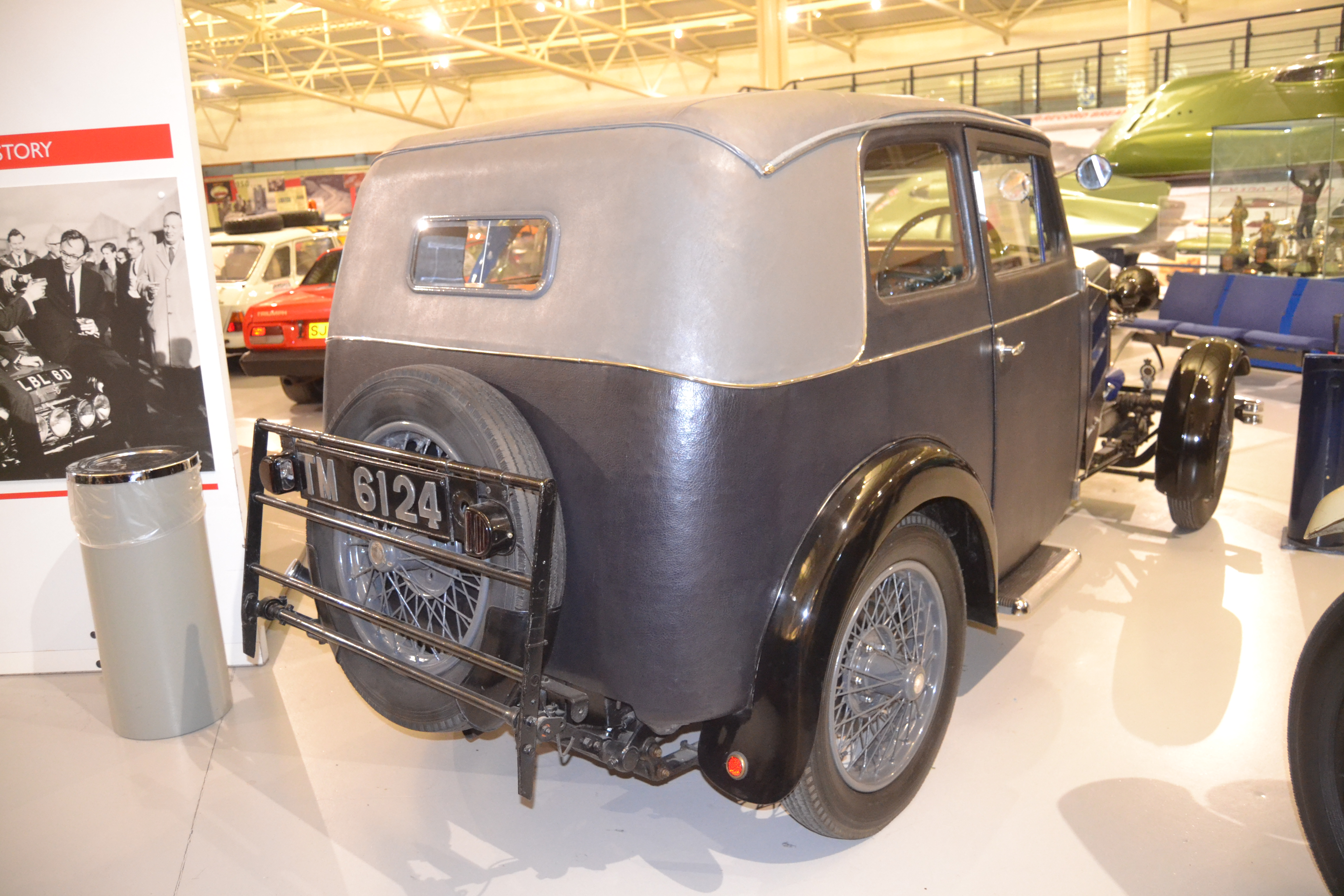
rear view

The Rover Light Six was a narrower lightweight short wheelbase variant of their Two-litre sports saloon produced from 1929 to 1930 by the Rover Company of Coventry. The following season it was sold with a 2½-litre 20 hp engine under the name Rover Light Twenty.

== Overview ==
Announced in October 1929 the Rover Light Six was one of the Rover cars manufactured when Spencer and Maurice Wilks, who joined Rover's team in 1929 and 1930, introduced new management practices and engineering techniques to Rover.

== Engine ==
The Light Six was powered by a watercooled 2 L straight-6 OHV engine with an output of 45 bhp at 3600 rpm designed by Peter Poppe, which provided the Two-litre saloon a maximum speed of 60 mph (97 km/h). The bore of 65 mm put the engine into the 16 hp taxation class.

The car was supplied with a three-speed gearbox controlled by a lever in the centre of the car. The lever was flexible, operated in a gate and had a stop to avoid engaging reverse.

The engine clutch and gearbox assembly was mounted and supported at three points, the single one in front, the rear pair by horizontally U-shaped leaf spring attachments.

== Brakes suspension steering ==
The suspension was conventional for the time with half elliptic leaf springs all round mounted above the axles. The pedal brakes worked shoes in enclosed drums on all four wheels by rods but the handbrake used those on the back wheels and operated them by chain. There are shock absorbers fore and aft.

== Body ==
The body was very light weight rattle free fabric bodywork built by Rover under licence from Weymann. For the driver's comfort the clutch pedal is adjustable for travel and the front seat can be adjusted over a range of six inches using wing nuts in the cushion.

== Publicity ==
The Rover Light Six won attention when it was the first successful participant in the Blue Train Races, a series of record-breaking attempts between automobiles and trains in the late 1920s and early 1930s. It saw a number of motorists and their own or sponsored automobiles race against the Le Train Bleu, a train that ran between Calais and the French Riviera.

Please note that TM6124, car/chassis number 430 pictured above is not the actual race car. The car used was an early press demonstrator that Rover retained for development purposes. On the 27 January 1930 the Rover's third and successful attempt started from St Raphael on the Riviera and ended at Calais 20 hours later, averaging 38 mph over 750 miles. The little Rover beat the Blue Train by 20 minutes.

== Road test ==
Tested by Autocar in late 1929 the car seemed capable of a 70 mph top speed though weather conditions prohibited a formal measurement. The engine's smoothness was fine except under load at speeds below 20 mph in top gear. The car seemed geared for speed and not fuel economy. The single wiper was mounted at the foot of the windscreen to provide the widest possible view. The steering column was nearer horizontal than usual. Roadholding was fair but springing when with two persons aboard needs further adjustment of the shock absorbers. The style of the body is original and to many people attractive.
