= Rover 14 =

The Rover Fourteen was a medium-sized family car and variants produced by the British Rover car company between 1924 and 1948. Civilian automobile production was interrupted in 1940 because of the war, but when the war ended in 1945, the Rover 14 returned to the market and remained available until replaced by the Rover 75 at the beginning of 1948.

== Clegg 14 ==
Rover's first 14 was no more than a renamed 12. Introduced in 1912 designed by Clegg it became known as Rover's Clegg 12. The name was changed to 14 in 1923. It was last offered for sale in 1925. See Rover Clegg.

== 14/45 ==
Rover 14/45

Overview
- Manufacturer: Rover
- Model years: 1924–1928

Body and chassis
- Body style: chassis only; 2 or 3-seater tourer; 5-seater tourer; Weymann saloon; coupé

Powertrain
- Engine: 2132 cc ohc straight 4

Dimensions
- Wheelbase: 120 in (3,048.0 mm) track 54 in (1,371.6 mm)
- Length: 178 in (4,521.2 mm)
- Width: 60 in (1,524.0 mm)
- Height: not published
- Kerb weight: 2,688 lb (1,219 kg)

Rover 14/45

Layout
- Configuration: straight 4
- Displacement: 2,132 cc (130 cu in)
- Cylinder bore: 75 mm (2.95 in)
- Piston stroke: 120 mm (4.72 in)

Combustion
- Fuel system: Solex downdraught carburettor
- Fuel type: petrol
- Oil system: pressure
- Cooling system: water circulated by impeller to fan-assisted radiator

Output
- Power output: 45 bhp (34 kW; 46 PS) @2,500 rpm Tax horsepower 13.95

Chronology
- Predecessor: Rover 14
- Successor: Rover Two-litre

Announced in October 1924 with a much more powerful engine than its predecessor it would remain available until 1928 though "supplemented" from May 1926 by the 2.4-litre 16/50 with a strengthened transmission on the same chassis. Somewhat unconventional the new 14/45 displayed these distinctive attributes: unusual engine design (spherical combustion chambers), four-wheel brakes, four-speed gearbox

Engine

The engine was given spherical combustion chambers for which greater efficiency was claimed because it provided more even burning of the fuel and air mixture. The engine's sparking plugs had been placed in the centre of each combustion chamber and on either side of the plug the overhead valves were mounted at 45 degrees to the head. One overhead camshaft acts directly on the inlet valves and through horizontal pushrods works the exhaust valves on the other side of the engine. The camshaft was driven by a vertical shaft at the rear of the engine. Water circulation was assisted by an impeller. By the time of the following Motor Show the worm drive at the rear of the engine for the camshaft and other accessories had been modified to deal with a noise problem.

Transmission

Engine clutch and gearbox were held as a unit at three points. There was a single plate clutch, its housing cast in one piece with the gearbox, a four-speed gearbox and an enclosed drive shaft taking power to the spiral bevel final drive. The gear lever, adjustable for reach, was positioned by the driver's right hand.

Brakes steering suspension

The worm and sector steering box was fixed to the engine and received lubrication from it. All four wheels had internally expanding brakes. The hand lever operated only the back pair. Unconventional in action it was simplified for the following Motor Show. The front brakes used the Perrot system. The car's springs were all half-elliptical, flat-set and gaitered.

Body

As well as the windscreen there was a rear screen and luggage grid. The hood was supplied with a draught excluder and all-weather side curtains. The front seats could be adjusted.

Road test

The reviewer for "The Times" liked the car though he did comment that the flexible and responsive engine seemed to have "no very marked bite". The engine remained cool throughout the test. The otherwise unusually good suspension allowed too much rocking movement fore and aft. Passenger accommodation back and front was "unusually comfortable" and "wholly quiet". The car "looks well".

== Pilot 14 and Speed Pilot ==
This car was a renamed Pilot 14 after the engine was enlarged from 12 to 14 horsepower in mid 1932. See Rover Pilot

== Rover 14 P1 (1933–1938) ==
Rover 14 P1
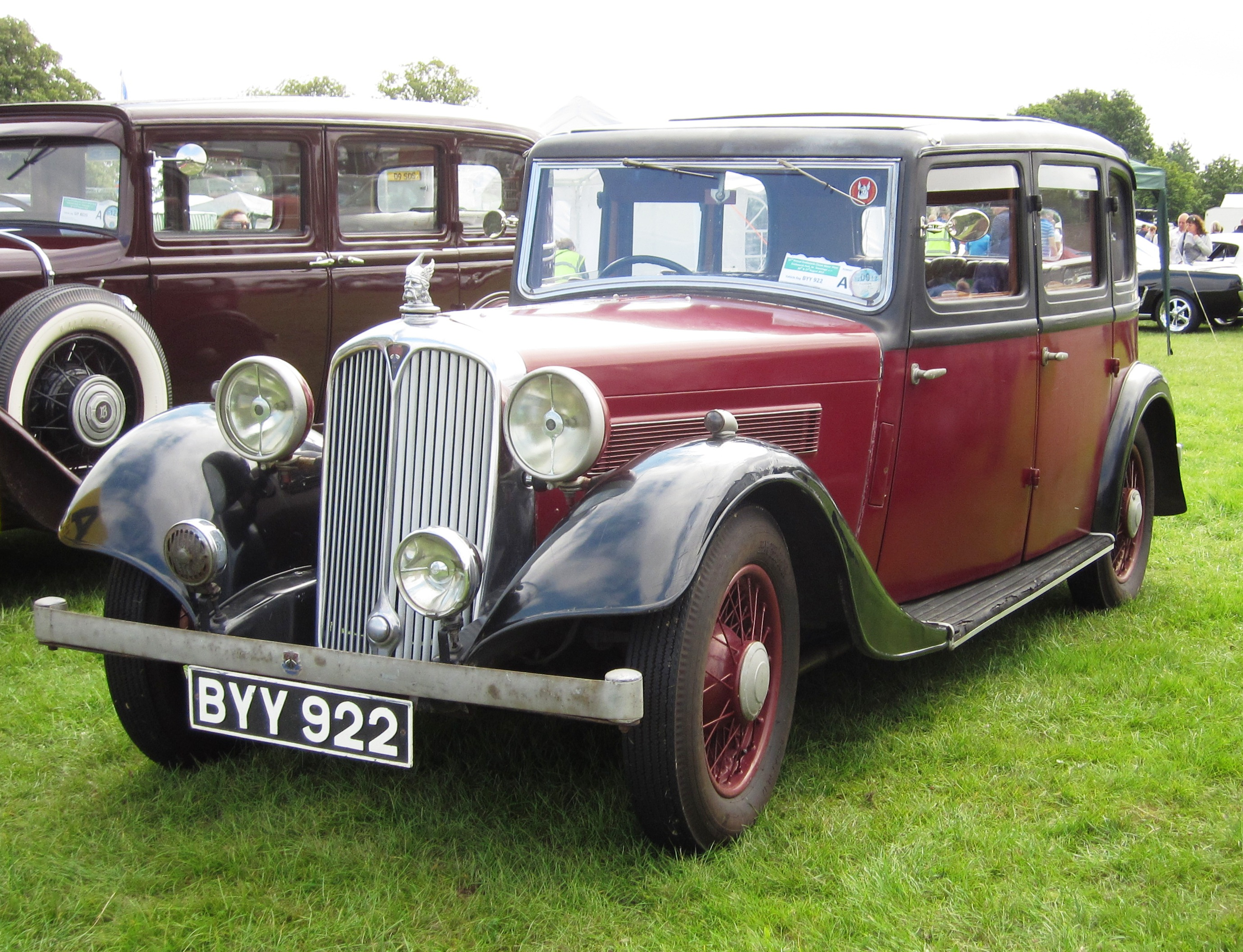
- 1935 Fourteen 6-light saloon P1

Overview
- Manufacturer: Rover
- Production: 1933–1938

Body and chassis
- Body style: chassis only; four-door “six-light” saloon; four-door "four-light" sports saloon; Streamline saloon (fastback); Speed Fourteen Streamline coupé; Speed Fourteen Hastings coupé; sports four-seater; * coupé and sports bodies also available with 54 bhp engine as Rover Speed Fourteen

Powertrain
- Engine: 1577 cc straight 6
- Transmission: gear control central and 'remote'; 4-speed with 'quiet' 2nd and 3rd; free-wheel controlled from dashboard (automatic starting); single-dry-plate clutch; open propeller shaft; spiral bevel rear axle

Dimensions
- Wheelbase: 2,921 mm (115 in)
- Length: 4,191 mm (165 in) to 4,445 mm (175 in)
- Width: 1,575 mm (62 in) to 1,588 mm (63 in)
- Kerb weight: P1 24 cwt, 2,688 lb (1,219 kg); P1 26 cwt, 2,912 lb (1,321 kg); P2

Chronology
- Predecessor: Pilot 14
- Successor: Rover P2

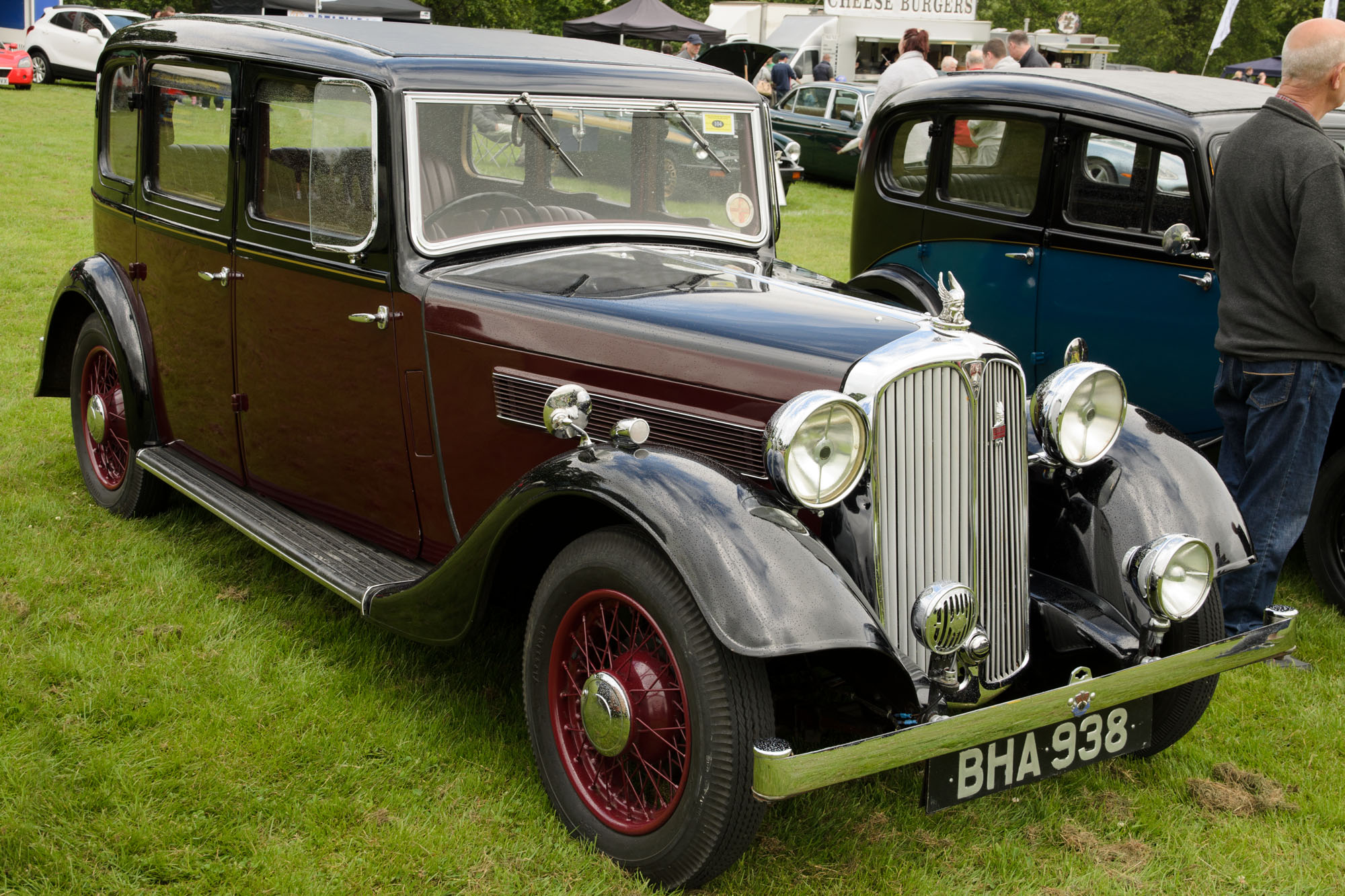
Fourteen 6-light saloon registered April 1938

The Rover Fourteen P1 was announced in early September 1933 to replace the interim Pilot 14. It had been seen previously by the public in prototype in the RAC Rally at Hastings as the competition winning Rover Speed Fourteen 4-door coupé.

The B H Thomas six-cylinder ohv engine from the Pilot had a capacity of 1,577 cc. Maximum power output of 48 bhp (39.7 kW) at 4,600 rpm and a top speed of 111 km/h (69 mph) were claimed.

The car had no luggage compartment and the spare wheel and tyre were carried in a metal case positioned vertically above the back bumper with a fold-out luggage rack.

=== Streamline ===
During 1934 an extra new body shape was offered designated Streamline saloon and, more compact, a Streamline coupé. Both were a fastback shape, the rear portion not unlike the Riley Kestrel body. The four-door Streamline coupé's roof left even less headroom for the rear passengers than the restricted space available to backseat passengers in the Streamline saloon.

For the 1934 Olympia Motor Show the wheelbase was extended by 3 inches to 115 inches and the track widened by ½ an inch. The lengthened wheelbase put the seats well within the wheelbase.

=== Speed Fourteen ===
The Speed engine had three semi-downdraught carburettors in place of the standard single down-draught instrument, specially streamlined ports and manifolds and a high-compression cylinder head. Output was 54 bhp at 4,800 rpm.

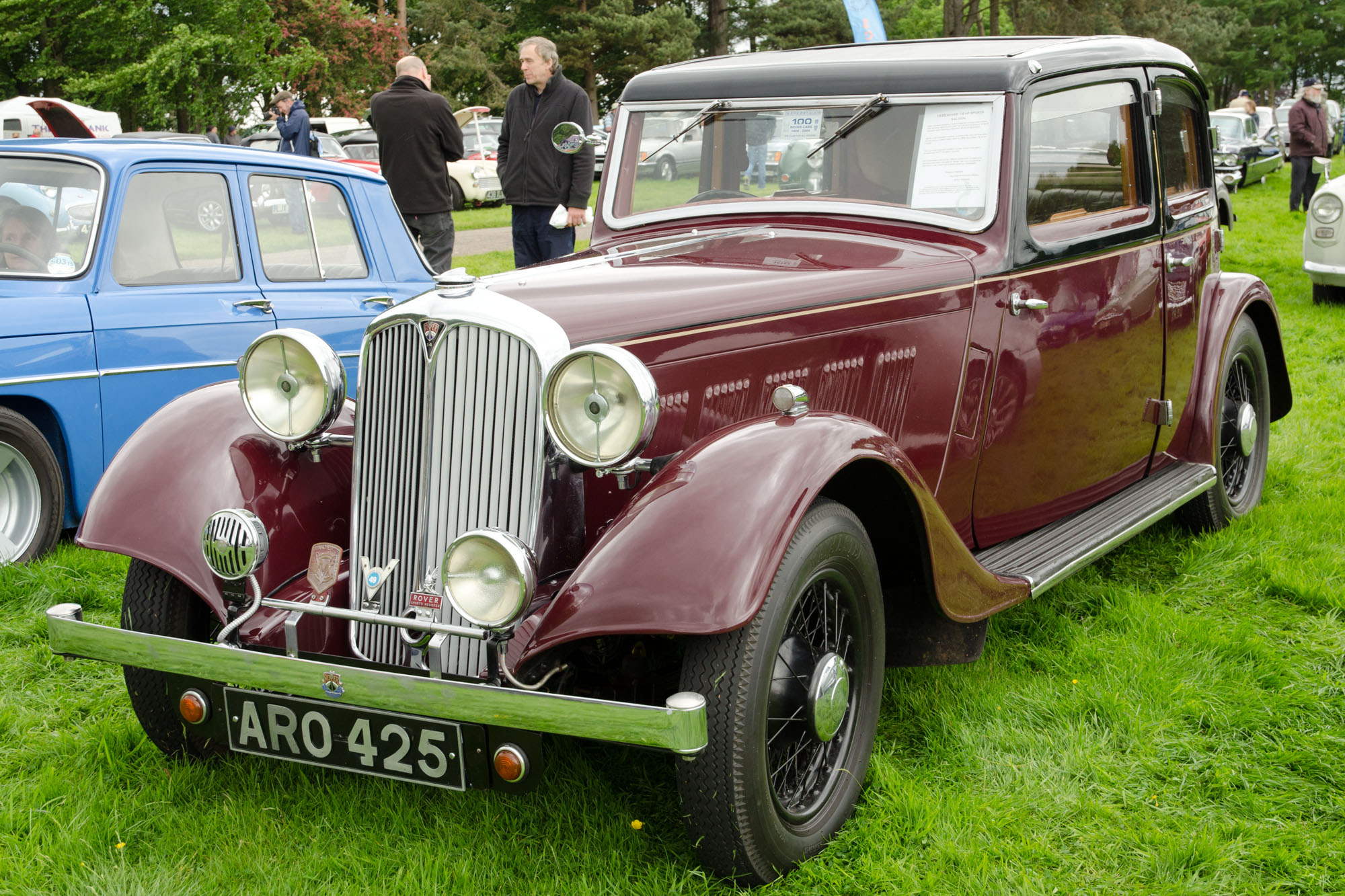
1935 Speed Fourteen sports saloon P1

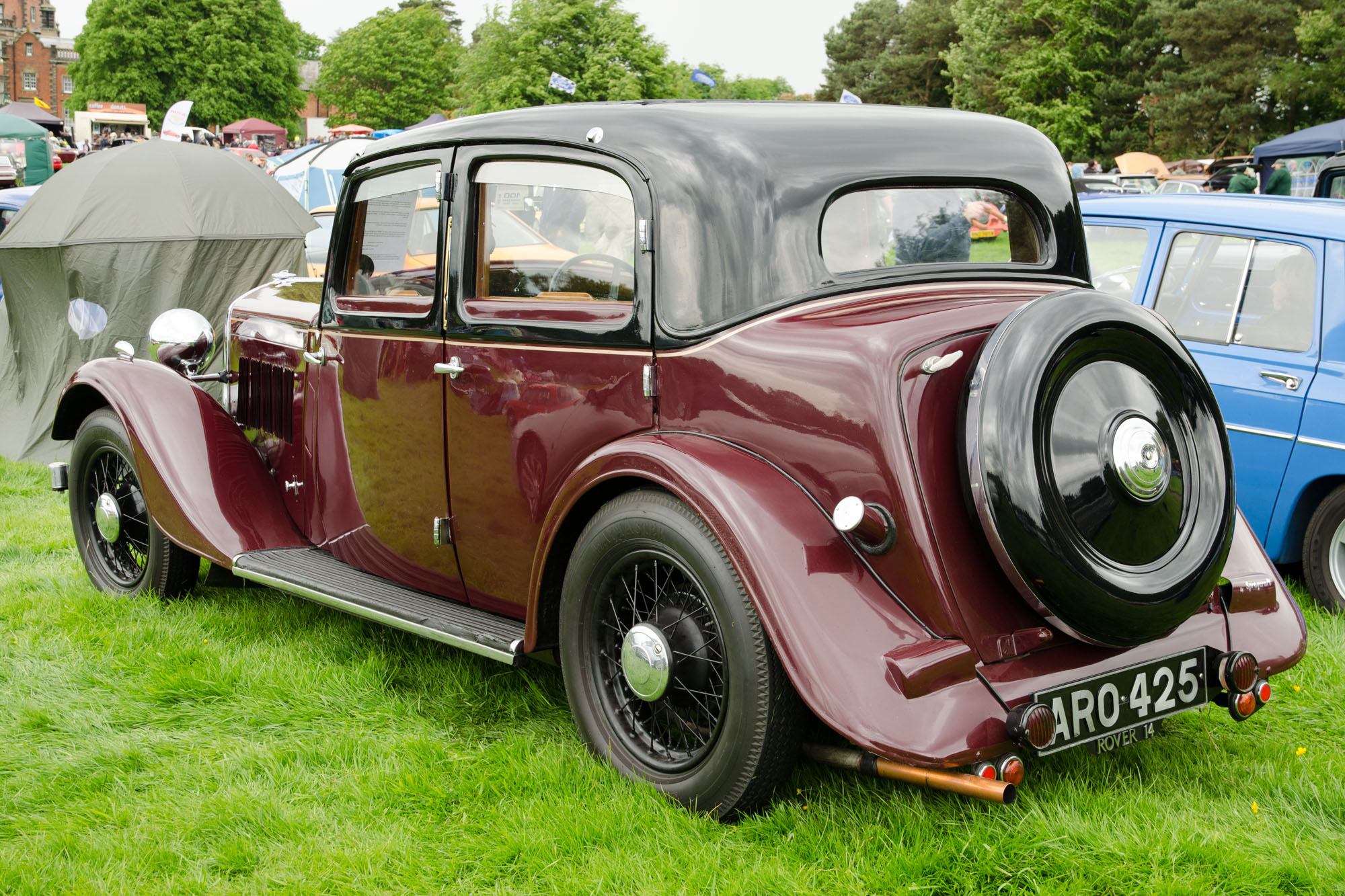
with flush fitting sliding roof
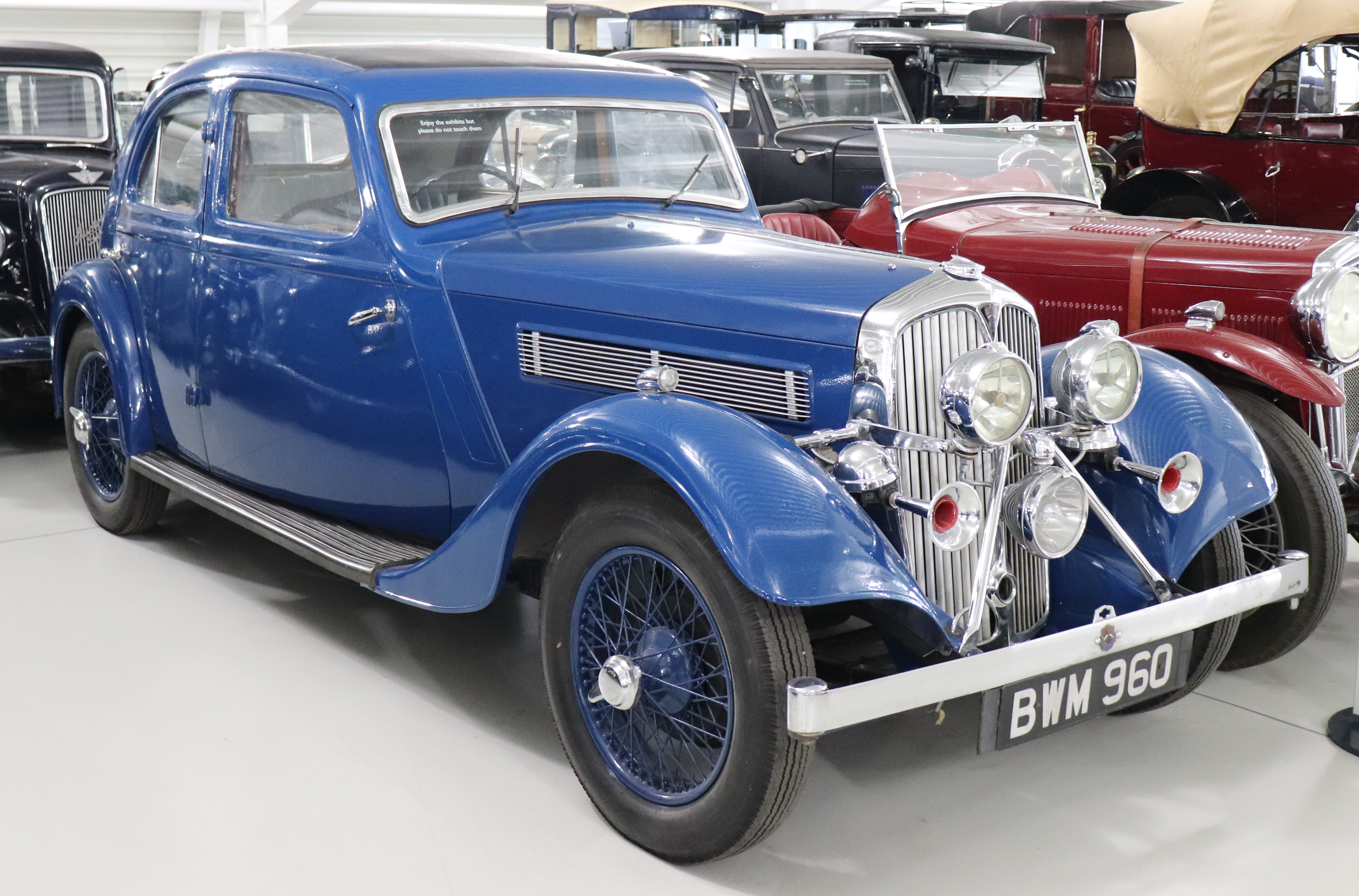
1936 Speed Fourteen 4-door Streamline saloon

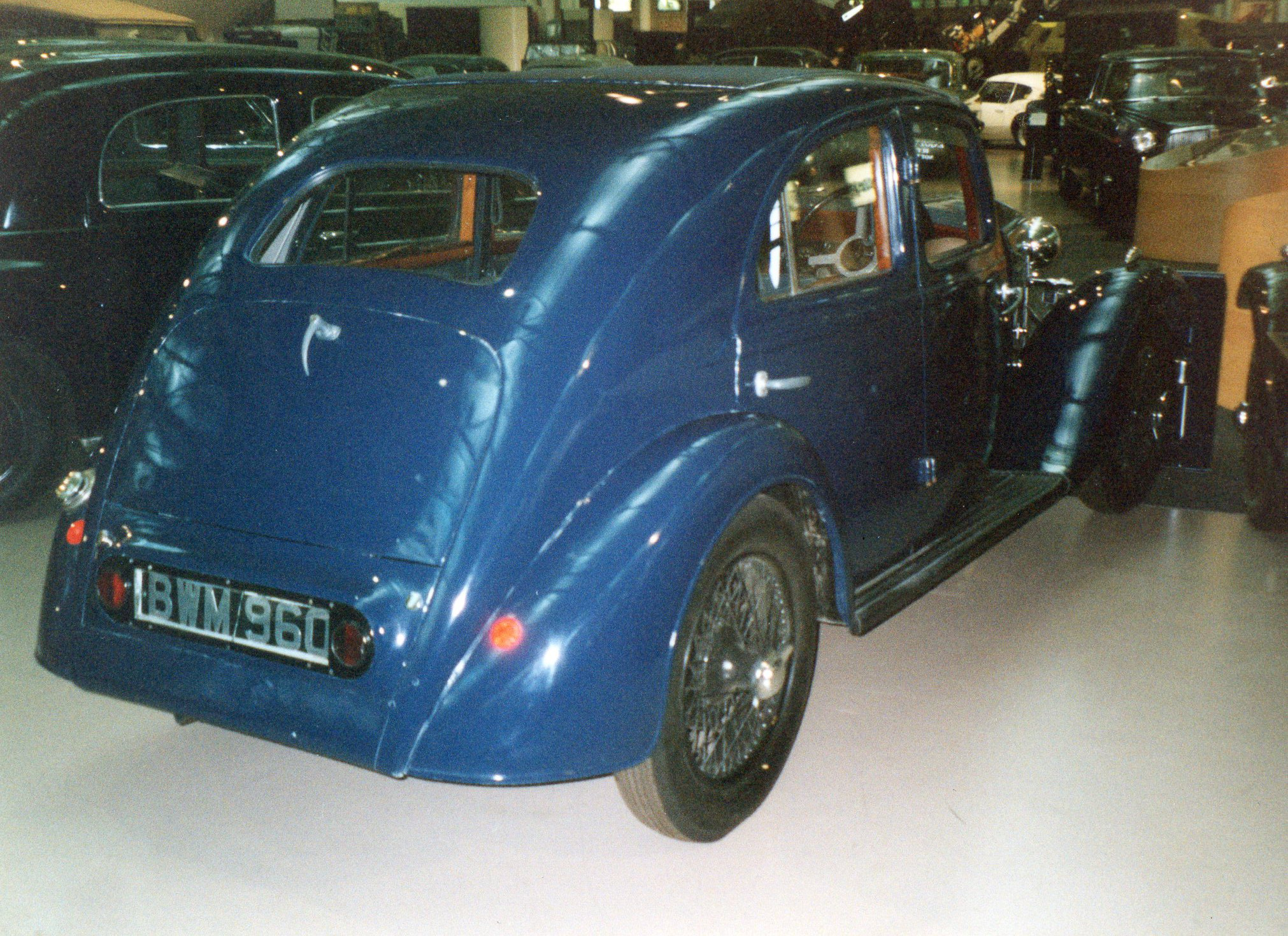

=== Road test of a Speed Fourteen Hastings coupé ===
The Times' correspondent thought the car travelled rapidly and smoothly and found the lines of the body pleasing. Front seat access, he said, is easy but the rear seat though having good leg and elbow room and just enough head clearance is as difficult as most sports models to climb into. The car seemed "well-found" - two wipers with two motors, a fitted tool tray below the instrument panel, a windscreen with a handle and concealed chain for security. The signal lever has an automatic return. Driving position, location and action of all controls were all fine. There is a harmonic stabiliser. Though a sports car the engine is not fussy or hesitant at low speeds. The best speed on the open road was about 80 miles an hour.

=== Road test of a Fourteen 6-light saloon ===
The standard four-door saloon was tested in April 1937 with a wheelbase 3 inches longer. Although it had the less highly tuned engine and reached just 70 mph on the straight the tester described it as fast for its size, stable on the road. ". . . with the even travel, speed is deceptive"

More powerful engine

From the summer of 1936 Rover customers wishing to combine the Fourteen's virtues with better performance could opt for the Rover 16 which combined the same body with a larger engine.

== Rover 14 P2 (1938–1948) ==
Rover 14 P2
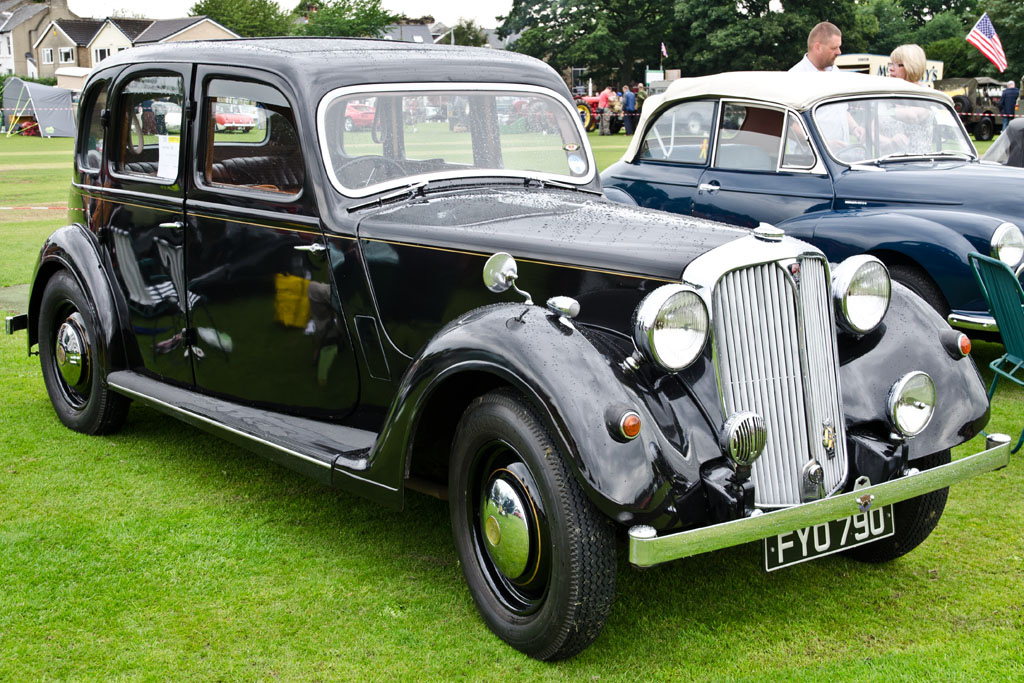
- Fourteen 6-light saloon registered September 1939 (postwar car was longer and wider)

Overview
- Manufacturer: Rover
- Production: 1938–1940; 1945–1948

Body and chassis
- Body style: 4-door 6-light saloon; 4-door 4-light sports saloon; drophead coupé

Powertrain
- Engine: 1901 cc straight 6

Chronology
- Predecessor: Rover Fourteen P1
- Successor: Rover Fourteen P3

An "entirely new" car was announced on 14 October 1938 with a more powerful engine, 1901 cc, new coachwork, "easy-clean" wheels and additional refinements including synchromesh on 3rd and top gears (not essential on cars with freewheel), automatic chassis lubrication and anti-roll stabilisers front and back. The track is now 48 inches, tools are now in a rubber-lined tray

This model was part of the Rover P2 range, along with Rover 10, Rover 12, Rover 16 and Rover 20 variants.

In 1945 another 2½ inches was added to the wheelbase as well as 2½ inches to the track.
