= Peter August Poppe =

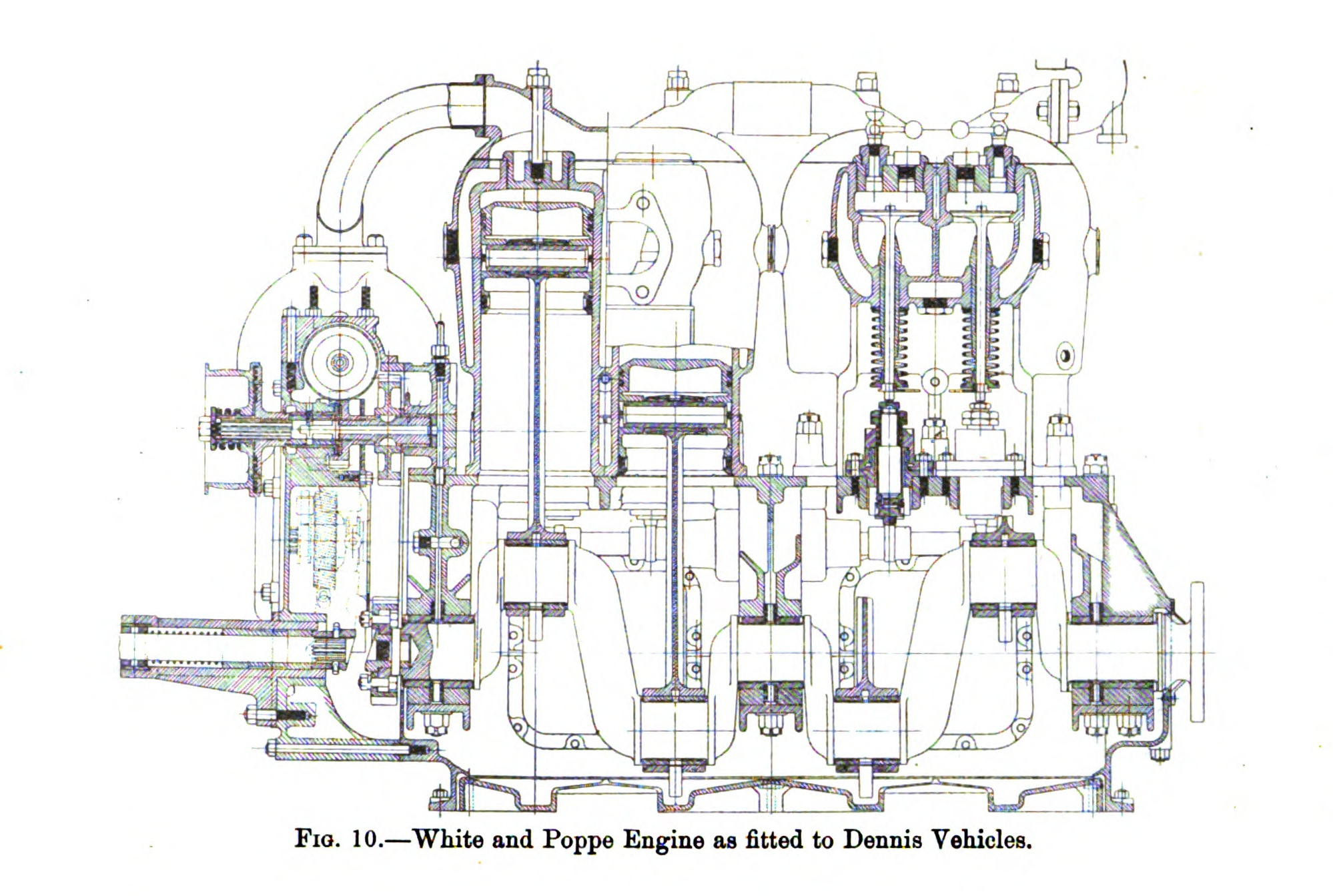
- White and Poppe engine for Dennis Brothers 1915
- Born: 17 August 1870; Skogn, Nord-Trøndelag, Norway
- Died: 13 February 1933 (aged 62); Coventry, Warwickshire, England
- Education: Horten tekniske skole, Vestfold
- Occupations: Automotive engineer, designer and manufacturer
- Spouse: Fredrikke Emilie ____ / Poppe (1878–1928)
- Children: Erling Poppe (1898-1970); Gunnar Poppe (1901-1964); Olaf Poppe (1906-1970); Ingerid Poppe (1910-1986)

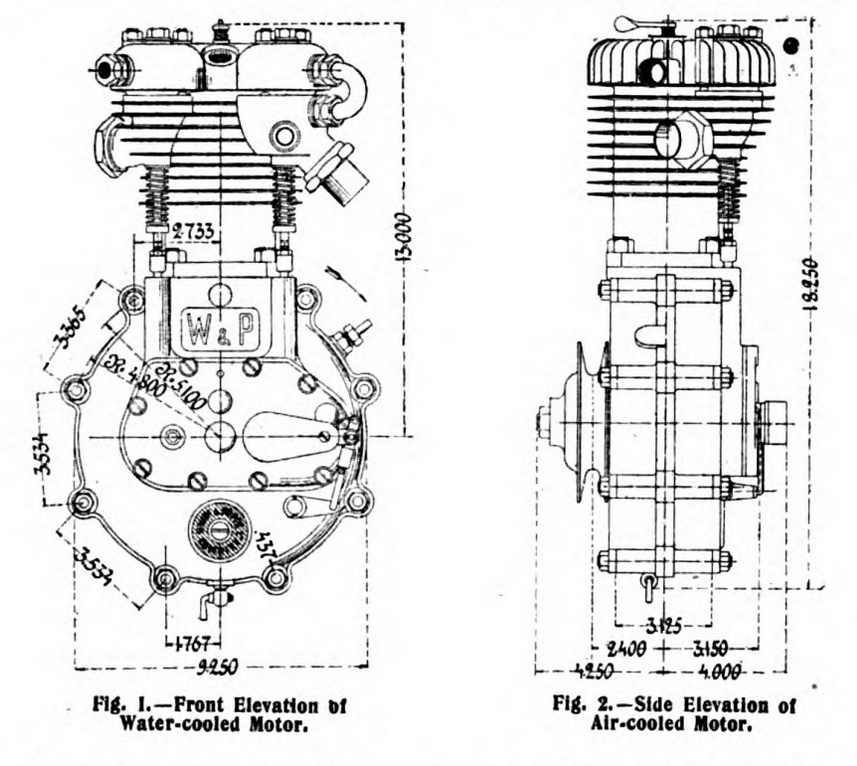
Poppe's 1903 design for a motorcycle engine available air-cooled or with a water-cooled cylinder head

Peter August Poppe (17 August 1870 – 13 February 1933) was a Norwegian-born engineer, designer and developer of engines and complete motor vehicles for the British motor industry. He was a co-founder of the engine manufacturer White and Poppe.

== Biography ==
Poppe was born at Skogn in Nord-Trøndelag, Norway. He graduated from Horten Technical School (Horten tekniske skole) in Vestfold. He was employed by Kongsberg Gruppen and later lent by them to the weapons factory, Steyr Mannlicher at Steyr, Austria.

In August 1897 he met with trained watchmaker Alfred James White, son of English watchmaker Joseph White (1836–1906). In September 1899, with financial backing from the White family, they incorporated White and Poppe Limited and started in business in Coventry, England. (Note: to carry on the business of manufacturers, vendors, and factors of and dealers in gas, steam, oil, or electric motors or engines, and other component parts and accessories, etc.) Peter August Poppe was technical director. In November 1919 the White family sold their share to steady customers, Dennis Brothers Limited of Guildford. Poppe remained with the business until 1923 then joined the Rover Company as chief engineer.

It is claimed that after the Armistice in 1918 Poppe's partner, White, was offered a knighthood which he declined because Poppe, as a foreign national, was unable to receive the same honour.

He had been elected a member of the Institution of Automobile Engineers by 1909.

Poppe put into production at Rover his already-completed design for a new 2-litre car, which became their 14/45. Poppe's new engine was considered very advanced but complex, particularly in its valve gear. There were numerous other smaller complexities as well. The resulting car, though comfortable, was heavy and considered underpowered. Within twelve months Rover had added a 2.4-litre 16/50 to their range, a sister car with a larger engine. They were a disaster for Rover, expensive to build and not popular with customers; around 2,000 were built. In response, Poppe designed another car with a 2-litre six-cylinder engine but similar results. His last design became the foundation of all Rover engines until 1948.

In 1929, he fell out with managing director Frank Searle and left in September of that year.

Poppe had a stroke and died suddenly at Coventry on 13 February 1933, aged 62. His wife had predeceased him by five years.

== Family ==
Eldest son Erling Poppe was a motorcycle designer. Olaf Poppe was Rover's chief planning engineer in 1949 and was also one of the team that developed Rover's gas turbines. In the same period Gunnar Poppe was works manager for Sunbeam-Talbot, having joined the Rootes Group after ten years (1923 to 1932) with Austin. He was captain of the London Welsh Rugby fifteen.
