= Rover 16 =

The Rover 16/50 and Rover 16 are mid-sized cars which were produced by Rover from 1926 to 1929 and non-continuously from 1936 to 1947 respectively.

Rover initially responding to requests for a more powerful engine for their four-cylinder 14 hp with the 16/50. It remained available into 1929 finishing its run soon after the demise of its smaller bore 14 hp twin. Meanwhile, Rover had begun to provide a six-cylinder 16 hp offering, their 2-litre, in its turn succeeded by their 16 hp Meteor.

Production of a considerably revised replacement for Rover's 16 hp Meteor was resumed under the name Rover 16 in mid 1936 and, with a gap for World War II, the 16 remained in Rover's catalogue until it was replaced by the Rover 75 in early 1948.

== Rover 16/50 ==
Rover 16/50

Overview
- Manufacturer: Rover
- Production: 1926–1929

Body and chassis
- Body style: 2-door open 2 or 3 seater; 4-door open five-seater; 2-door coupé; 4-door Weymann saloon; 4-door coachbuilt saloon; 2-door or 4-door open sports; chassis only
- Layout: FR

Powertrain
- Engine: 2,413 cc (147.3 cu in) Straight-4

Dimensions
- Wheelbase: 120 in (3,048 mm); Track 54 in (1,372 mm)
- Length: 178 in (4,521 mm)
- Width: 72 in (1,829 mm)
- Kerb weight: Saloon 24 cwt, 2,688 lb (1,219 kg)

Chronology
- Predecessor: Rover 14/45
- Successor: Rover Two-litre

Rover 16/50

Overview
- Manufacturer: Rover

Layout
- Configuration: Straight 4-cylinder overhead camshaft
- Displacement: 2,413 cc (147.3 cu in)
- Cylinder bore: 80 mm (3.15 in)
- Piston stroke: 120 mm (4.72 in)
- Valvetrain: overhead camshaft

Combustion
- Fuel type: petrol
- Cooling system: water

Output
- Power output: 50 bhp (37 kW; 51 PS) @ unreported rpm; Tax horsepower 15.87

Announced 21 May 1926 to supplement their 14/45 the 16/50 engine had a larger bore and was now rated at 16 rather than 14 hp for tax purposes. Its cubic capacity was 2.4-litres instead of 2.1-litres. The whole chassis closely follows the design of the 14/45 as does the design of the new engine. The 75 mm bore of the 14/45 has been increased by 5 mm.

=== Engine ===
The new engine has a Lanchester vibration damper on the front end of its crankshaft. Its camshaft and valves are overhead, the valves being set at an angle of 45 degrees on either side of the spark plug. At the back of the engine there is a vertical shaft to drive the camshaft. The camshaft works the inlet valves through rockers and by horizontal pushrods works the exhaust valves on the opposite side. The whole mechanism is enclosed and the covers are easy to remove. The double springs on the valve stems have variable tension. Though removing the cylinder head is not as simple as on a conventional design its removal does not affect the timing of the engine or its magneto. The crankshaft has three bearings, the camshaft four. The air supply to the carburettor is routed through a tunnel in the crankcase and in this way the air is slightly warmed while cooling the crankshaft's central bearing. The pistons are manganese with tubular connecting rods and the gudgeon pins receive positive oiling.

Water coolant is fed through a honeycomb radiator by a water impeller in unit with the belt-driven fan drawing air through the radiator.

Pressure feeds from the one reservoir provide automatic oiling to: engine, clutch, spigot-bearing, gearbox and steering, The central bearing in the torque tube is fed from the back axle.

Petrol is kept in a tank midway in the frame and fed to an Autovac on the dash. The dynamo is driven from the gearbox by an enclosed silent type chain.

=== Chassis ===
Steering is by worm and wheel. The steering box is fixed to the cylinder head and a long drop arm provides good leverage. The clutch uses a single plate and runs in oil. The 4-speed gearbox is a strengthened version of the 14/45 gearbox. It is assembled as a unit with the engine. It is operated by a right-hand change speed lever with reach adjustable for the driver. Gearbox lubrication is from the engine and automatic. Final drive is by spiral bevel

Brakes on all four wheels are operated by the foot pedal, those in front use the Perrott system. Pressure is distributed evenly by rods operated from a central location. The circular section front axle supports the chassis through underhung half-elliptical springs. The semi-elliptical back springs have central anchorages which can swivel about the axle case.

=== Body ===
The saloon's windscreen is V-shaped. The side windows have two sliding panels, two winding panels and fixed panels at the rear of the six-light body. The Weymann saloon's front seat is slidable by hand. The spare wheel is carried at the back of the body in front of the folding luggage grid.

Retrospective

"It was a car with doors that closed with the convincing clunk of a railway carriage, interiors trimmed with wood and leather, and an instrument panel with clear clock-faces. It had furnishings that looked like those in a doctor’s sitting room or even a consulting room, door cappings with fine inlays, and door pockets with leather flaps like giant tobacco pouches. The Doctor’s Coupé was a car for strong men in tweed plus-fours who preferred things built to last." – Eric Dymock, Rover: The First Ninety Years 1904-1994.

=== Road test ===
The Times' reviewer thought the engine's hemispherical combustion chambers and angled overhead valves unnecessarily complex. Four wheel brakes were provided and the overall braking system was, the reviewer thought, the best part of the whole car. Seating was comfortable in both front and back of the four-door saloon tested and the doorways The Times graded as "usable". There was just adequate headroom. The suspension rocked the saloon fore and aft if there were just two passengers. Comfortable maximum speed would be 55 to 60 mph.

The reviewer also commented that the price seems high for a four-cylinder 16 hp car. The open car was priced at £575, the Weymann saloon £675 and the coachbuilt saloon £775.

== Rover 16 P2 (1937–1948) ==
Rover 16
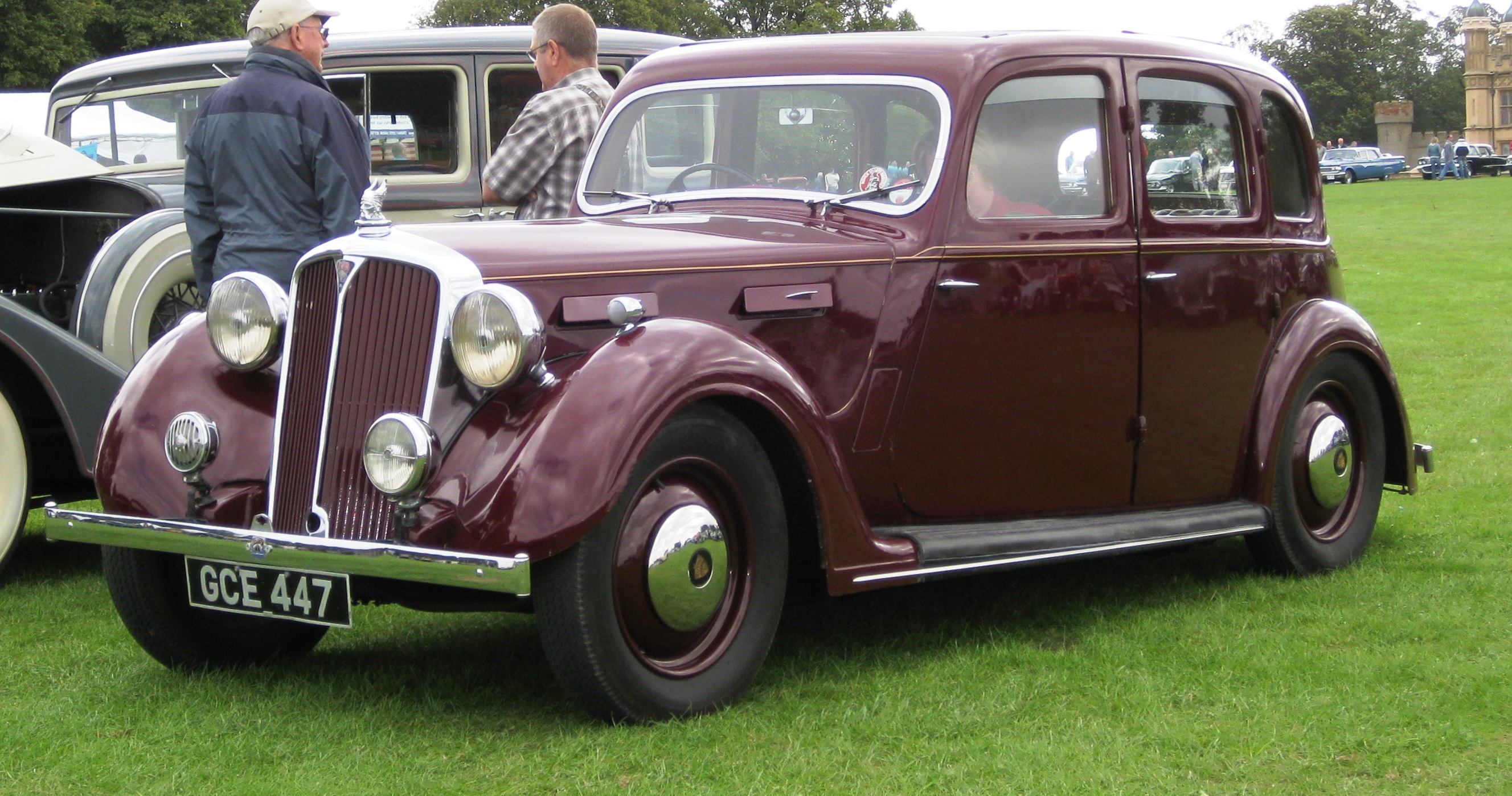
- 6-light saloon registered October 1947

Overview
- Manufacturer: Rover
- Production: 1937–1940; 1945–1948

Body and chassis
- Body style: four-door 6-light saloon; four-door 4-light sports saloon"; two-door drop head coupé

Powertrain
- Engine: 2147 cc straight 6

Dimensions
- Wheelbase: 113 in (2,870 mm)
- Length: 175 in (4,445 mm)
- Width: 62.5 in (1,588 mm)

Chronology
- Predecessor: Rover Meteor 16
- Successor: Rover 75

The Rover 16 was a medium-sized family car announced in mid-August 1936 and produced by the British Rover car company between 1936 and 1940 as a successor to the Rover Meteor 16. It was put back into production in 1945 following the Second World War and remained on sale until replaced by the Rover P3 in 1948. The 16 was part of the Rover P2 range, along with Rover 10, Rover 12, Rover 14 and Rover 20 models.

The car, with its mildly streamlined form, resembled the existing Rover 10 and the Rover 12 but was slightly longer and featured a more rounded back end. The six-cylinder ohv engine had a capacity of 2,147 cc. A top speed of 124 km/h (77 mph) was claimed. In addition to a “six-light” saloon and a “four-light” "sports saloon, a two-door cabriolet was available, usually referred to as a drophead coupé, with bodywork by Tickfords.

The sports saloon and the drophead coupé had slightly less length between the front and rear seats, but a longer bonnet, with the front footwell extending further beneath the bonnet.

A version called the Rover 14 saloon combined the same body with (from 1938) a 1,901 cc six-cylinder engine. There was also a version called the Rover 20 with a 2512 cc. engine.

Notable features included a "freewheel" system, Bijur-Luvax automatic lubrication of the chassis, and Girling rod actuated fully compensated mechanical brakes of exceptionally high efficiency.

=== Road test ===
Said the correspondent of The Times, "The Rover Sixteen is exceptionally attractive by reason of its quiet gentle manner, sweet running, comfort and spruceness in and out." Further lengthy comment was lyrical. The sole concern was that the engine could with advantage be rather more powerful. Comfortable maximum speed — 75 mph.

The Rover 16 saloon returned to production almost unchanged after the war, but with a different inlet manifold, and the horizontal SU carburettor was replaced with a Zenith downdraught unit, and the white metal crankshaft main bearings were replaced with shell bearings. The drop head coupe version was no longer listed.

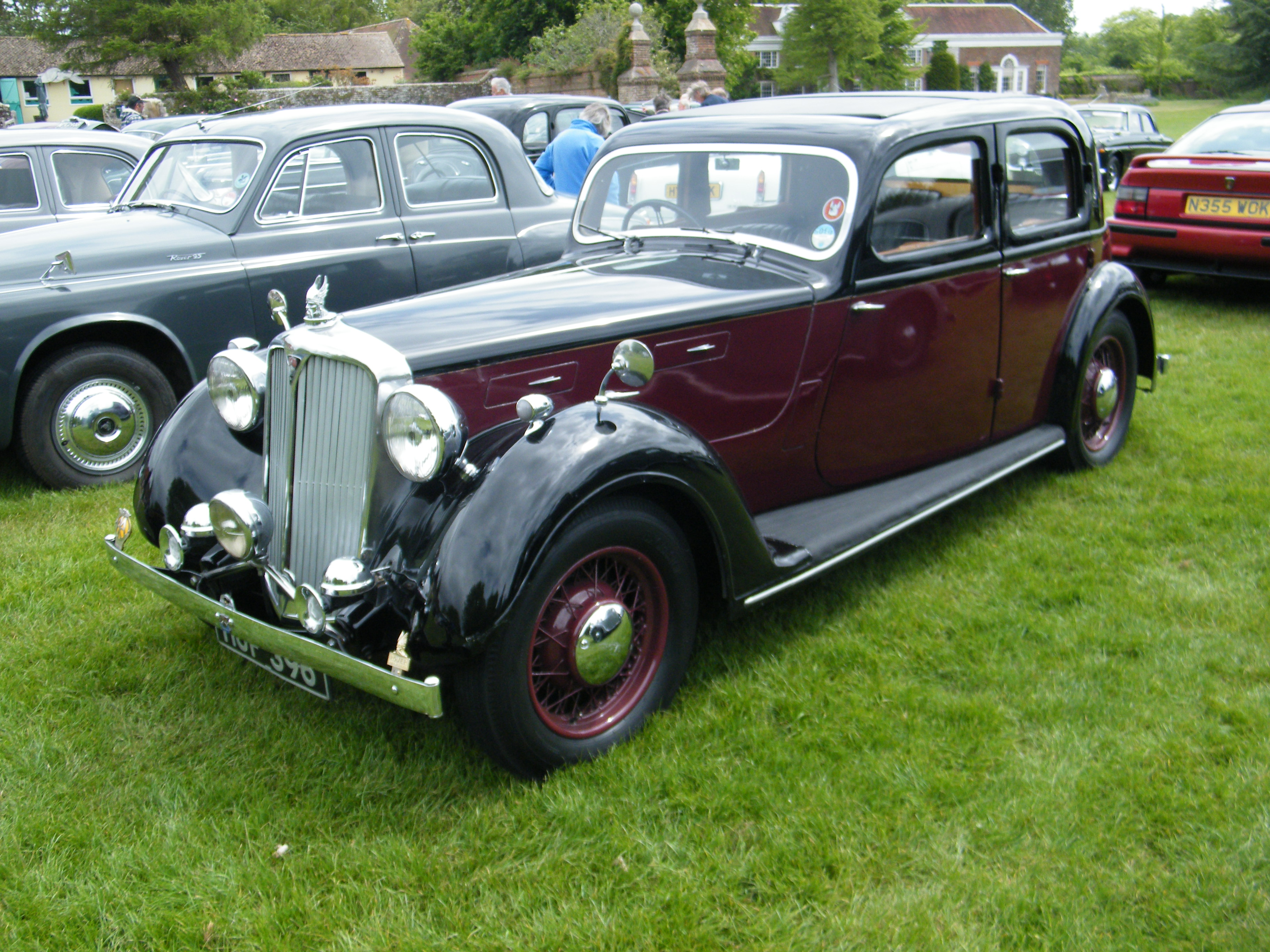
1947 sports saloon

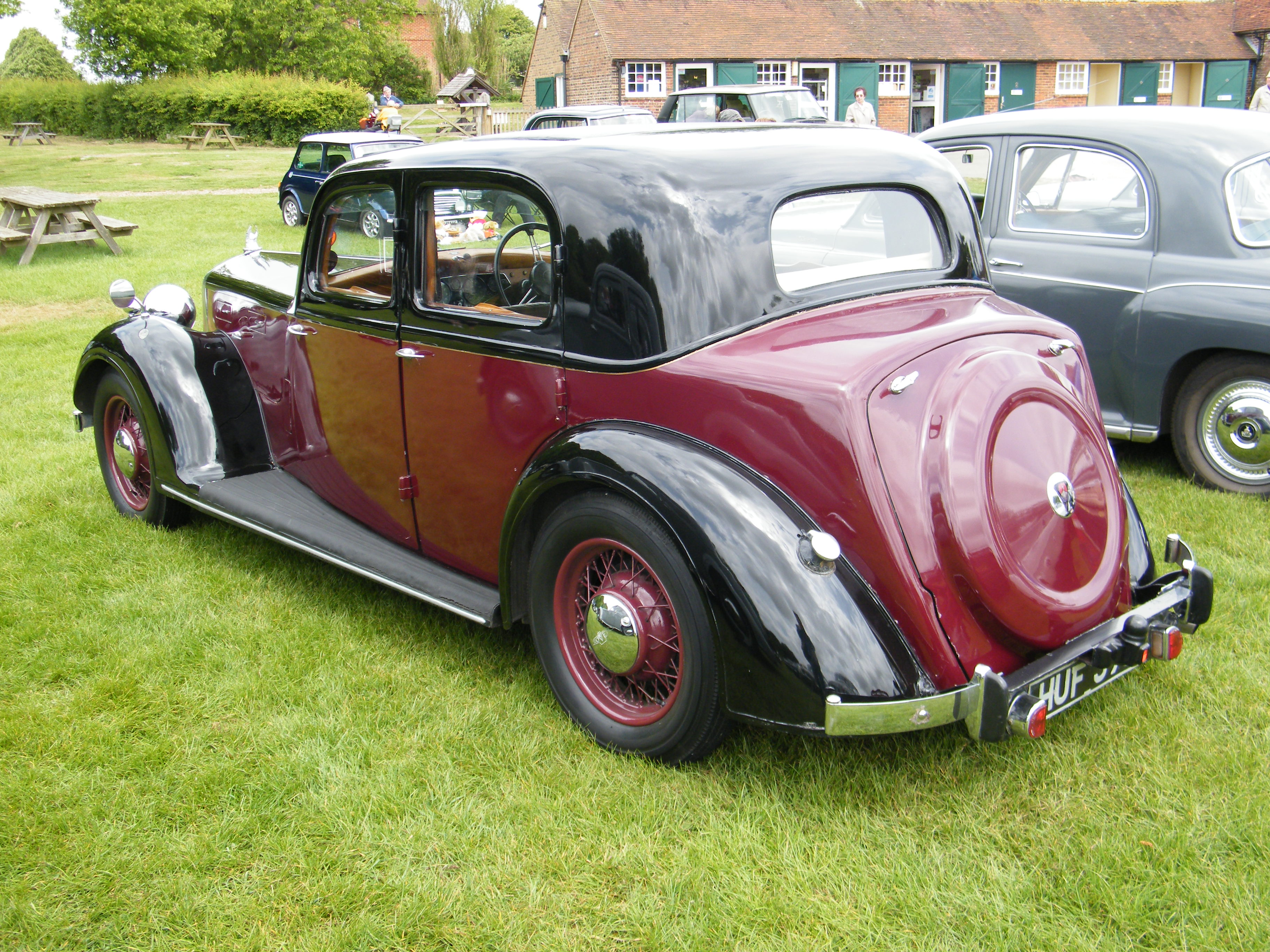

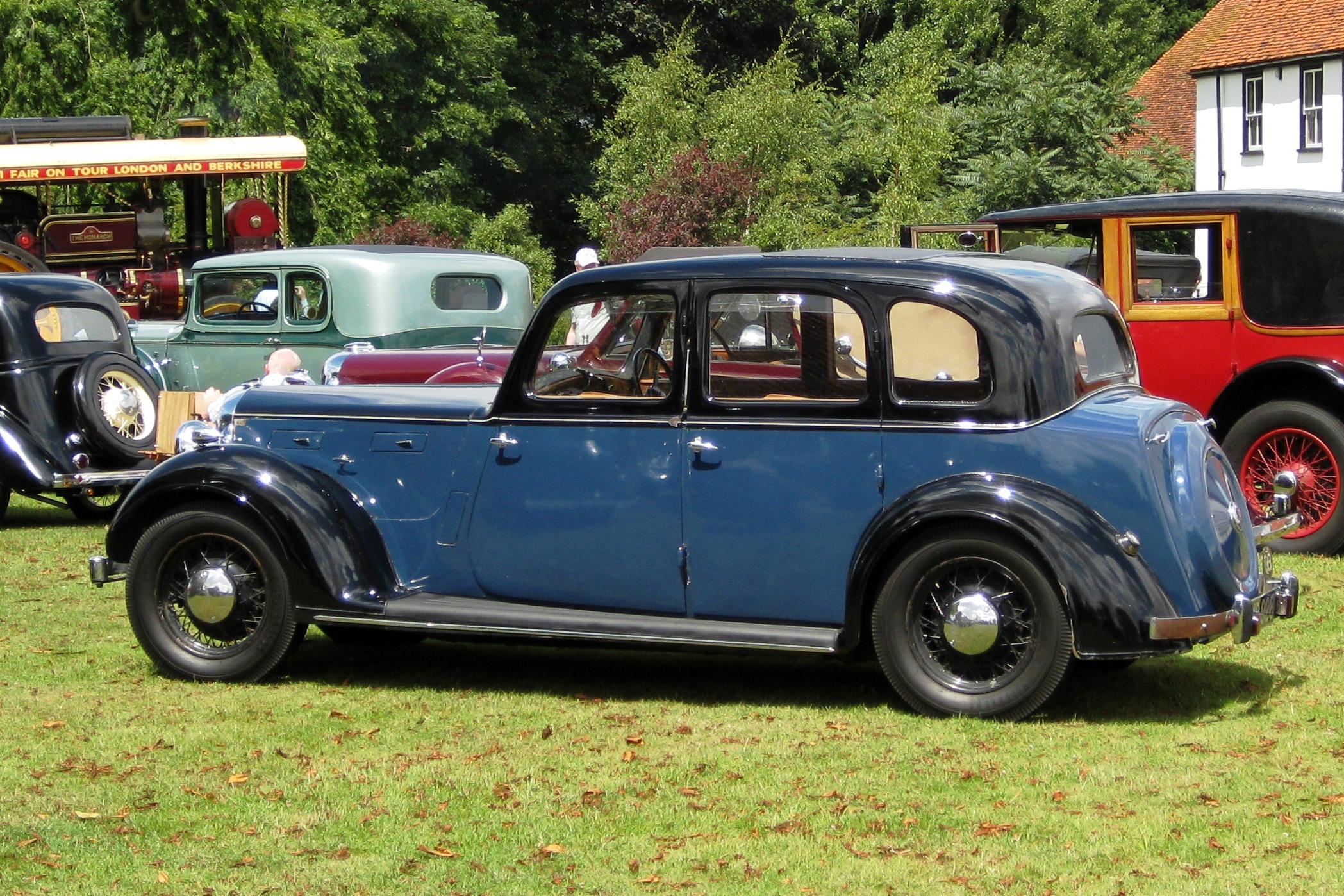
1947 6-light saloon

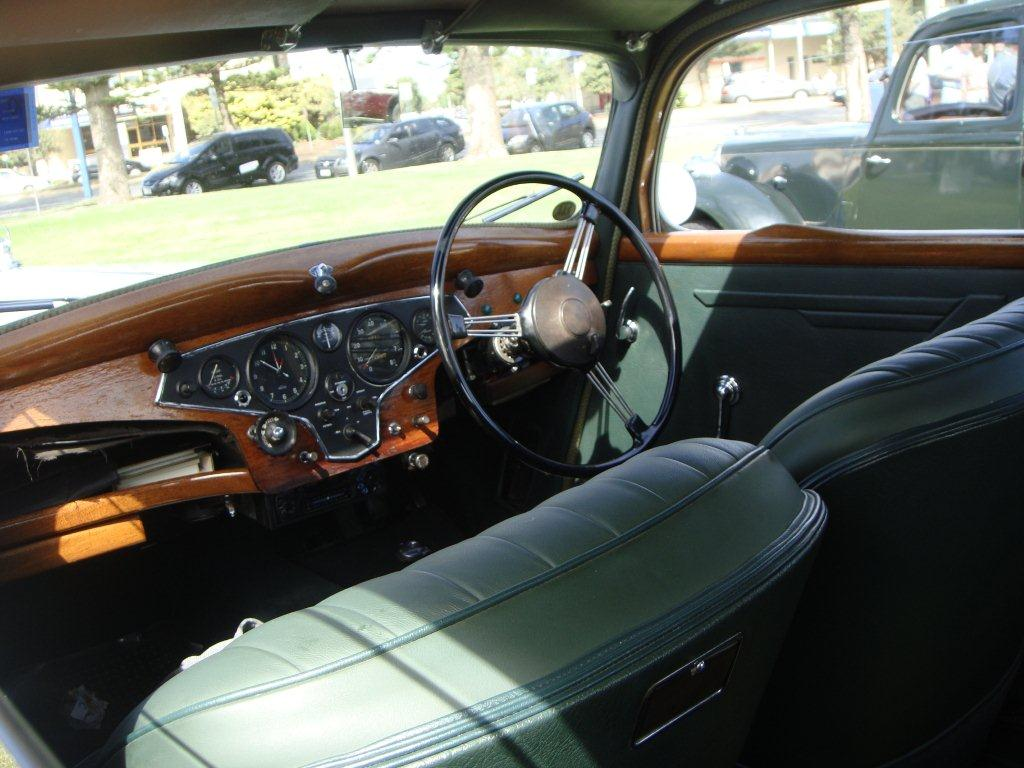
1947 sports saloon interior

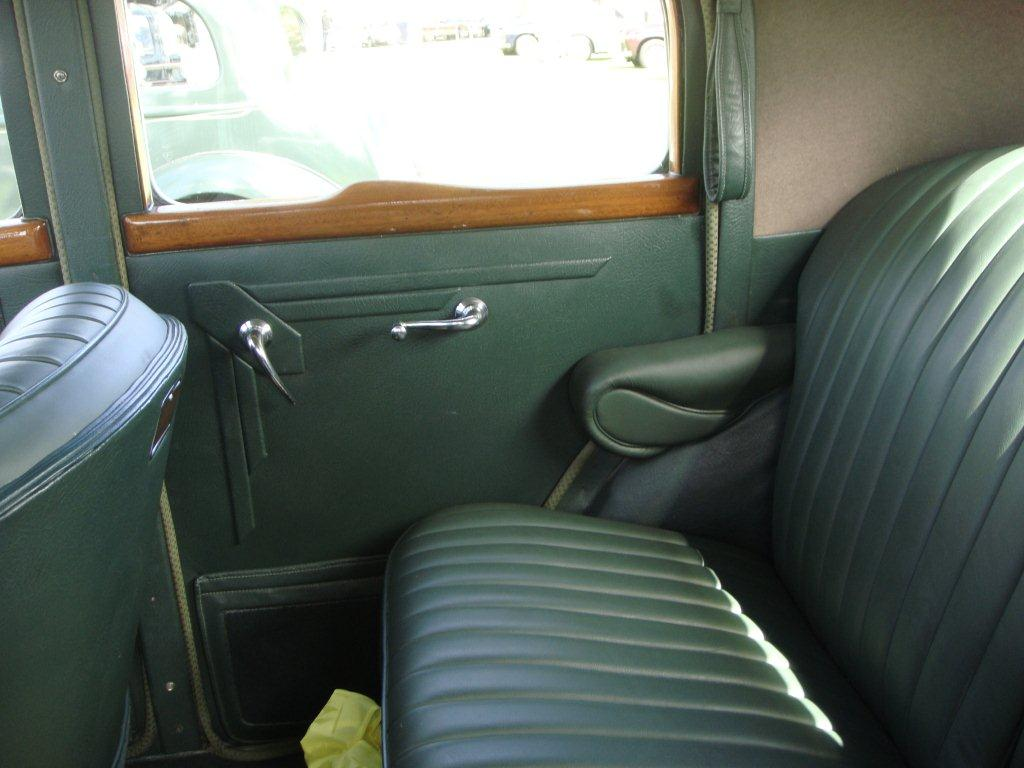

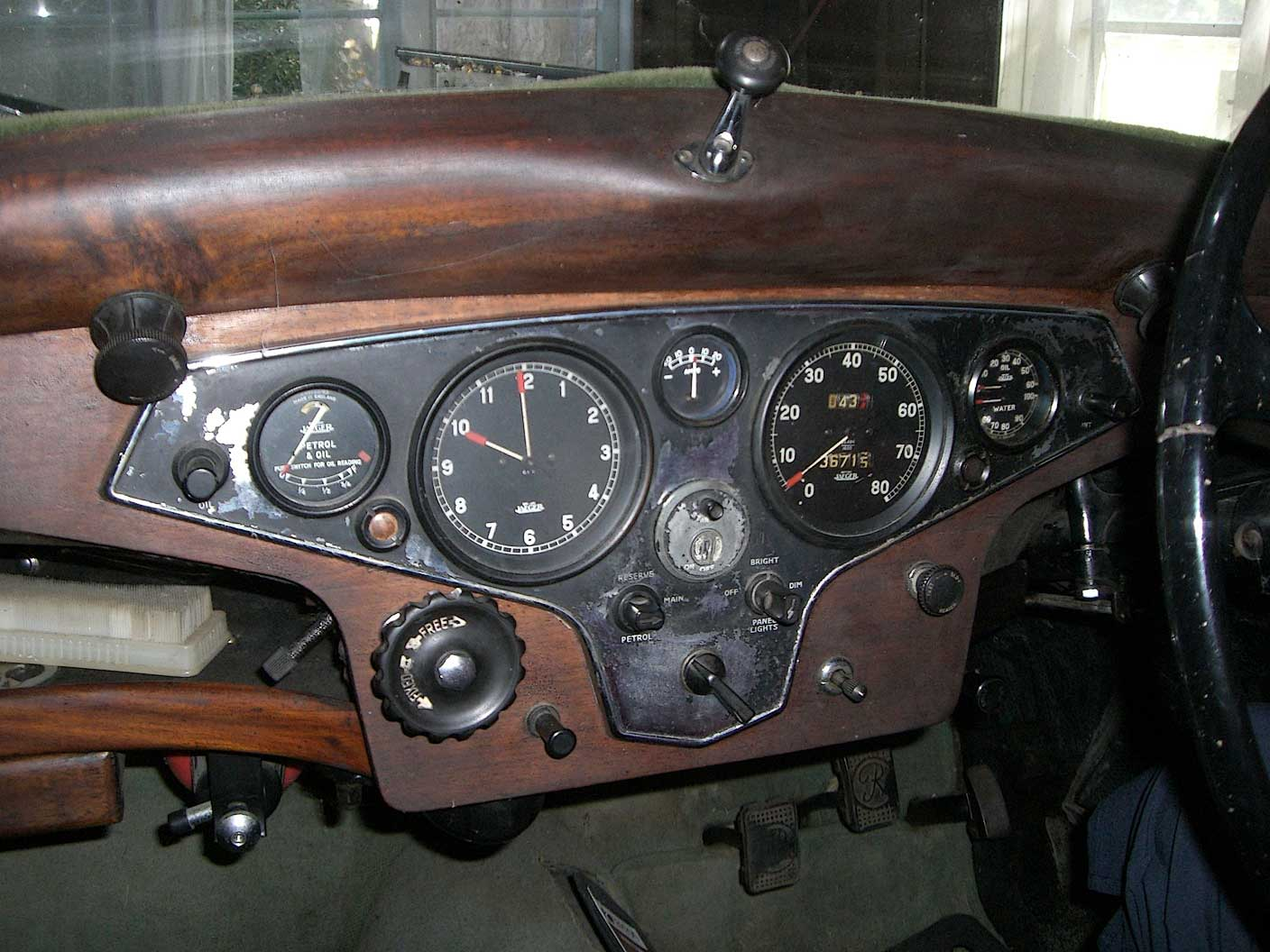

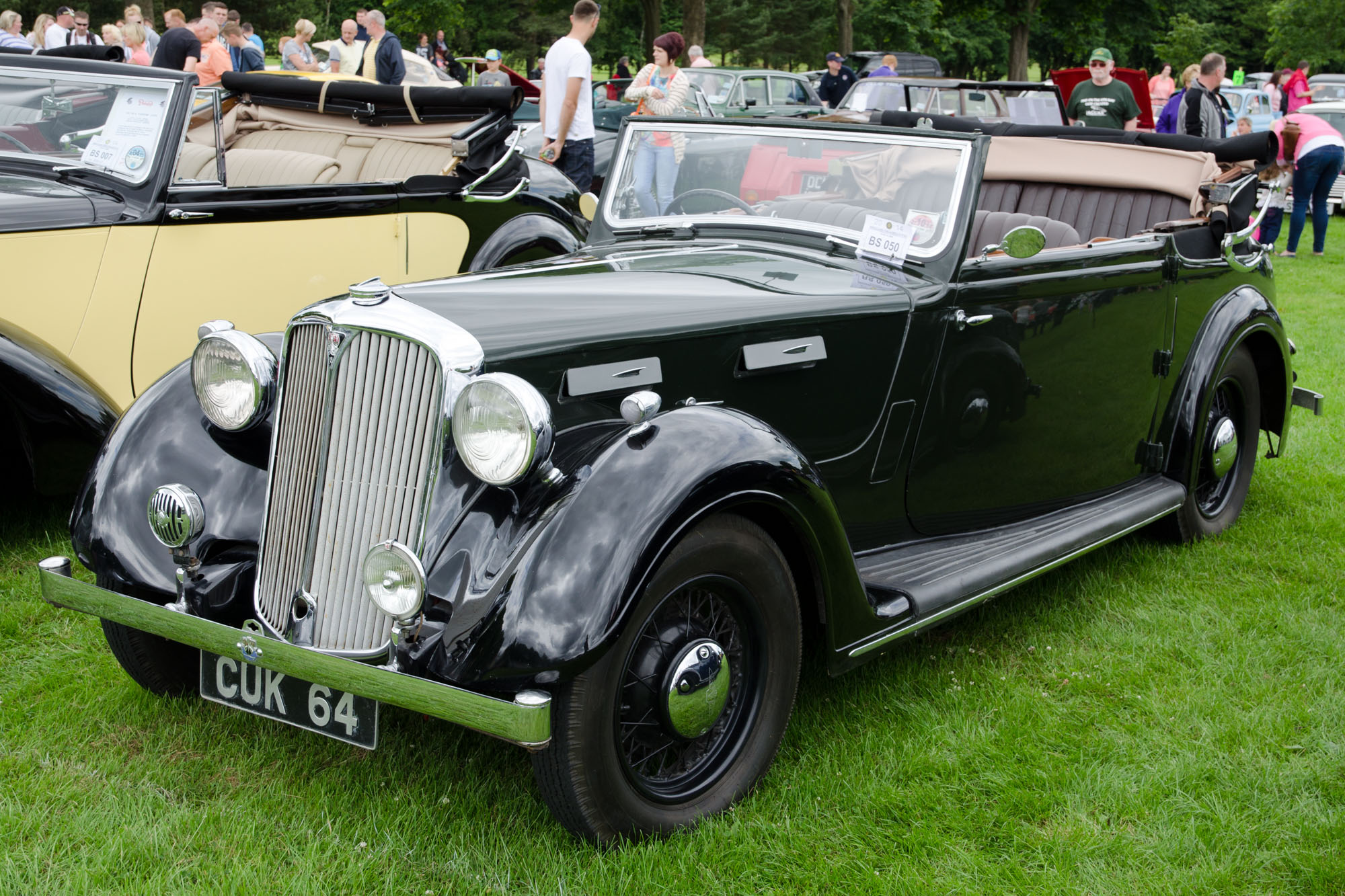
1939 drophead coupé

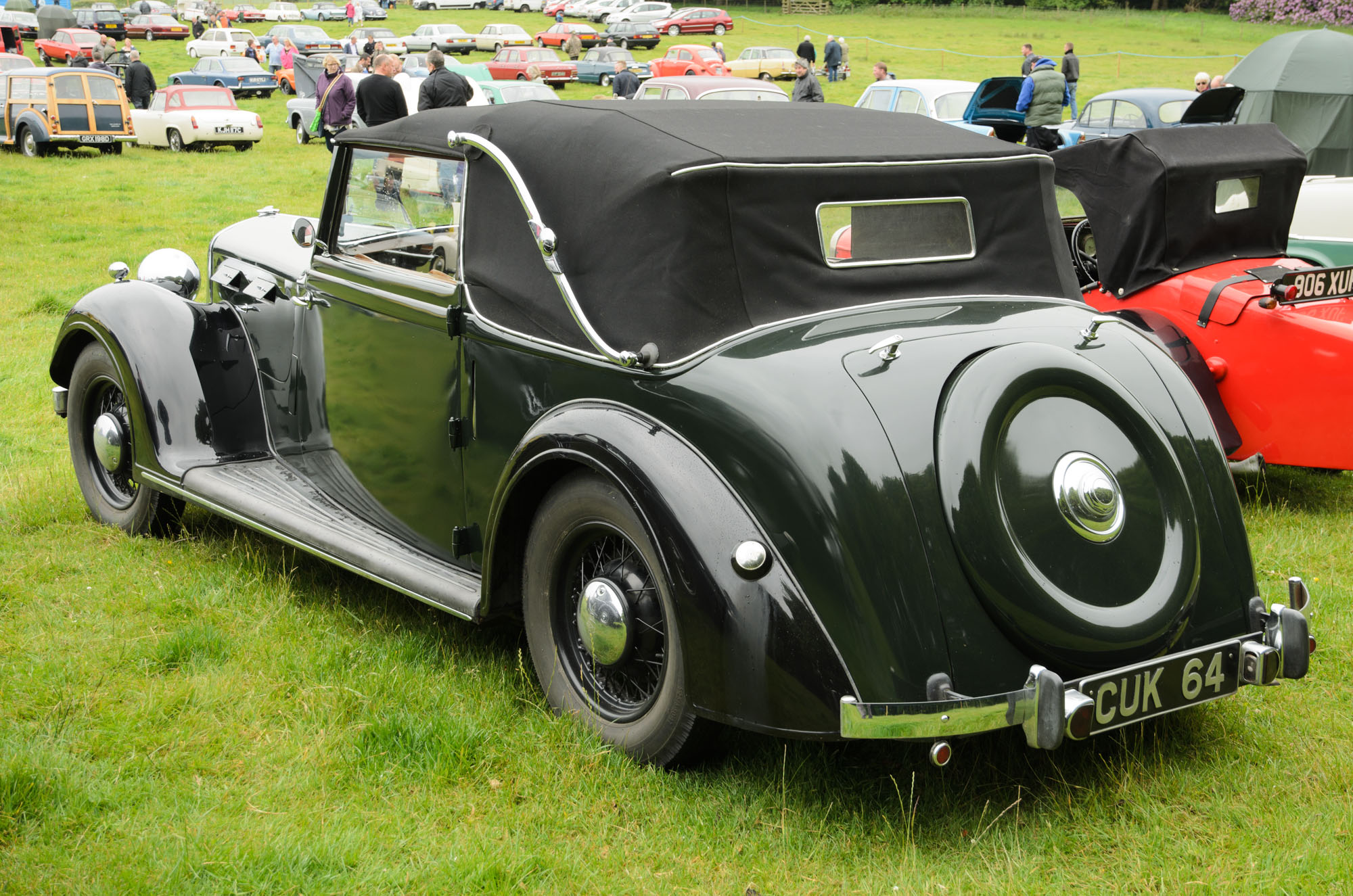
