= Rover 20 =

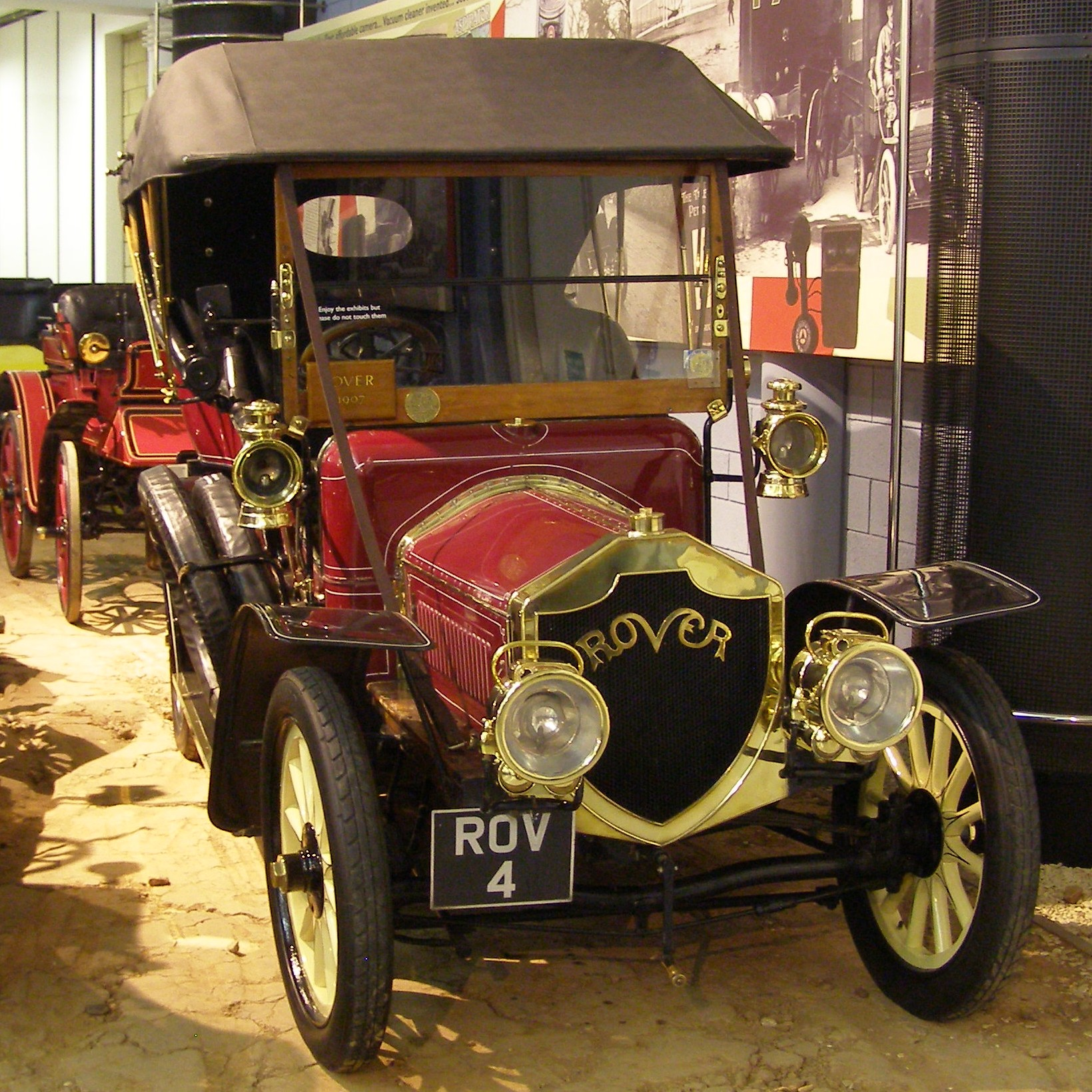
- Tourer first registered December 1907

Overview
- Manufacturer: Rover
- Production: 1907–1910
- Model years: 1908–1910

Body and chassis
- Body style: open tourer; landaulet; chassis only
- Layout: FR

Powertrain
- Engine: 3,251 cc (198.4 cu in) Straight-4

Dimensions
- Wheelbase: 114 in (2,896 mm) tourer; 120 in (3,048 mm) landaulet; Track 53 in (1,346 mm) wood; Track 55 in (1,397 mm) wire
- Length: 156 in (3,962 mm)
- Width: 63 in (1,600 mm)
- Kerb weight: Chassis 17 cwt, 1,904 lb (864 kg)

Rover 20hp
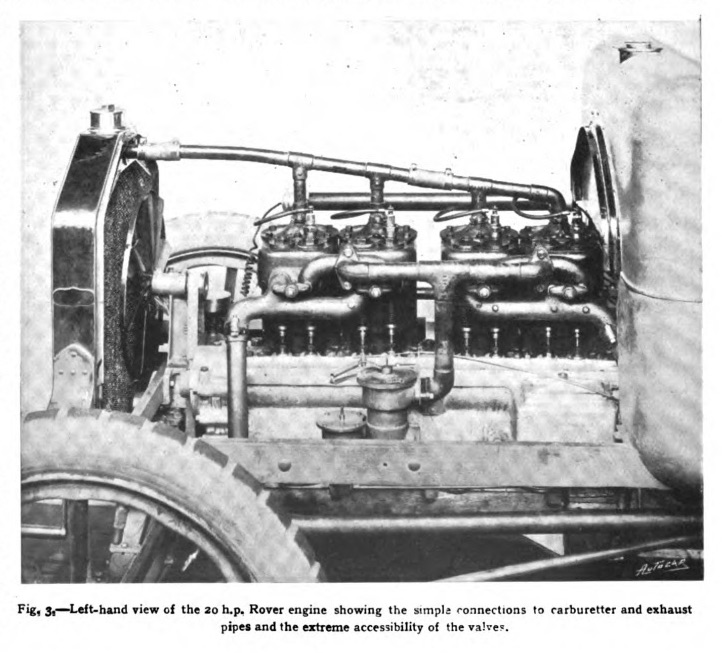
- engine's near side

Overview
- Manufacturer: Rover

Layout
- Configuration: straight 4-cylinder
- Displacement: 3,251 cc (198.4 cu in)
- Cylinder bore: 97 mm (3.8 in)
- Piston stroke: 110 mm (4.3 in)
- Cylinder block material: cast iron, en bloc, four separately cast cylinders
- Cylinder head material: in unit with blocks
- Valvetrain: side valves

Combustion
- Fuel system: Rover (pat.) carburettor gravity fed from fuel tank in scuttle
- Management: Bosch H T magneto or accumulator
- Fuel type: petrol
- Oil system: splash
- Cooling system: water: flattened tube radiator, water pump, fan

Output
- Power output: 2 bhp (1.5 kW; 2.0 PS) @2,400 rpm; Tax horsepower 23.33

Chronology
- Predecessor: Rover 16 but 20 has been bored out by 2mm

The Rover 20 was a new medium sized car announced by Rover in June 1907. It was a production version of the car which won the Isle of Man Tourist Trophy Race in 1906. However artillery wood wheels were fitted instead of the (still recommended) wire wheels used in the race and the longer wheelbase allowed the engine to be kept out of the passenger area. The prototype's engine came back beneath the petrol tank.

With a few breaks Rover kept a premium 20 tax horsepower car in their catalogue until the outbreak of war in 1939. In the early 1950s an equivalent model returned to the market, the 2.6-litre Rover 90 and later Rover's 3-litre.

== 1907 model ==
=== Engine ===
The engine was very much based on the Rover 16's but the bore had been increased 2mm. There were a number of minor improvements. The water inlet pipe was now to the other side of the engine to provide better access to the valves and tappets. The oil box (reservoir) was now at the left rear of the engine so a catcher for oil thrown up by the flywheel is no longer necessary. Lubrication pipes had been mounted lower. There was a new partition between sump and clutch housing so oil was not thrown to the clutch. Rover's engine braking system was fitted, it has the ability to close the engine's valves.

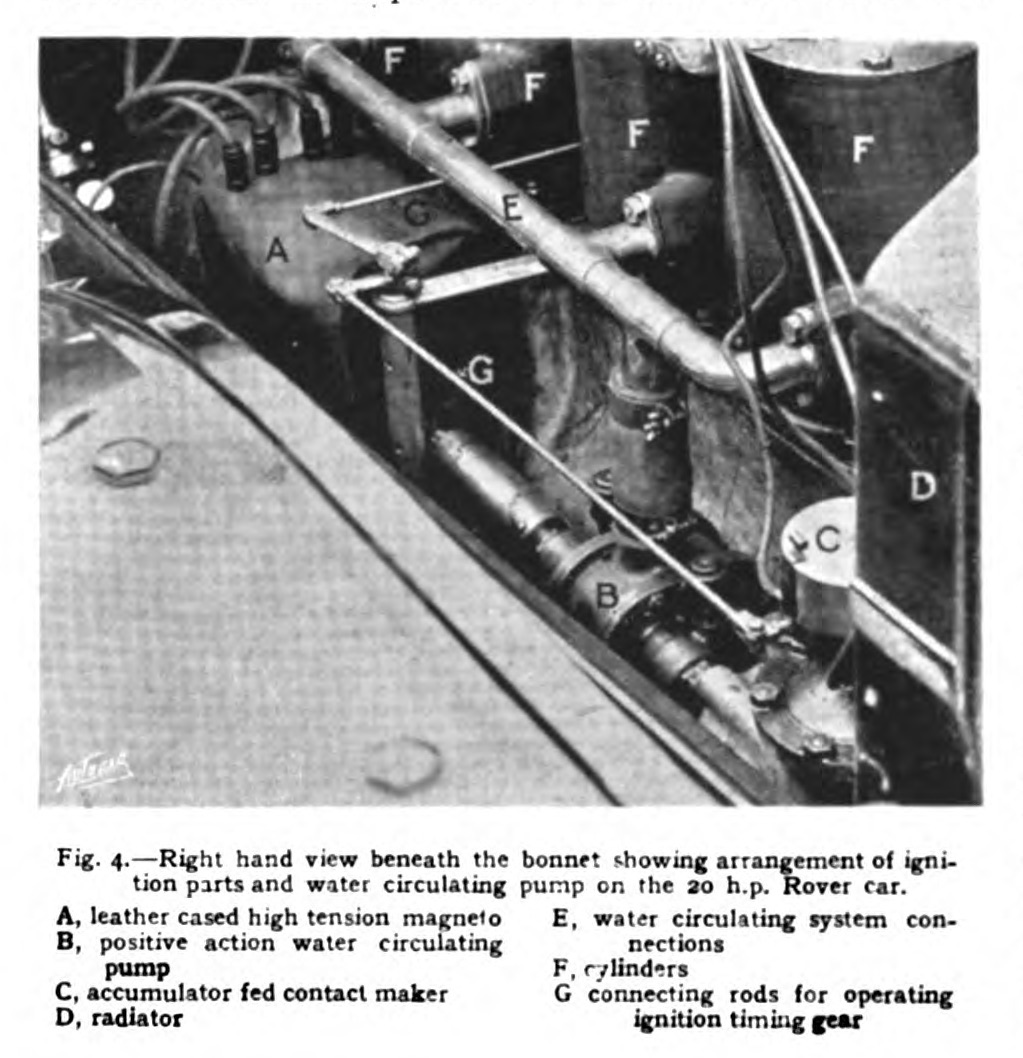
Engine's off side, showing ignition, etc.

The petrol tank was above the driver's knees with its filler in front of the centre of the windscreen and the tank shaped to form the car's dashboard and scuttle. It was high enough to always provide sufficient head of petrol and no pressure feed was needed. The coil is mounted on a board which slides in grooves on the front of the petrol tank. The coil is used with either an accumulator or the Eisemann ignition magneto and provides both ignition systems. At the forward right hand end of the engine a shaft spur-driven from the crankshaft powers the water circulation pump, the magneto and the contact maker. The magneto and contact maker are linked so one lever controls the advance or retard of the ignition timing.

Crankcase, clutch case and gearbox case are all aluminium castings. They are assembled to form one unit.

=== Gearbox ===
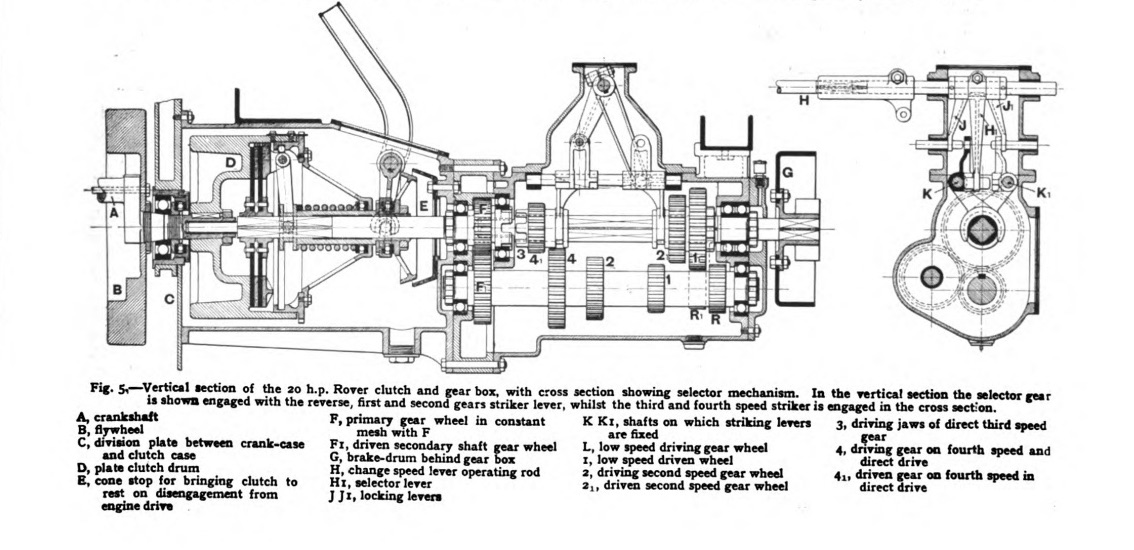
vertical section of clutch and gearbox

The four-speed gearbox had a gate change. The lever was located by the driver's right hand. Direct drive was on third gear, fourth gear was indirect. For a reduced price a three-speed gearbox could be supplied along with smaller diameter tyres in which case no magneto ignition system is fitted. The clutch has a cone stop to ease gear changes by slowing the clutch and the gearshift motion.

Ball bearings are fitted throughout to the engine and gear box and to the road wheels.

=== Brakes suspension steering ===
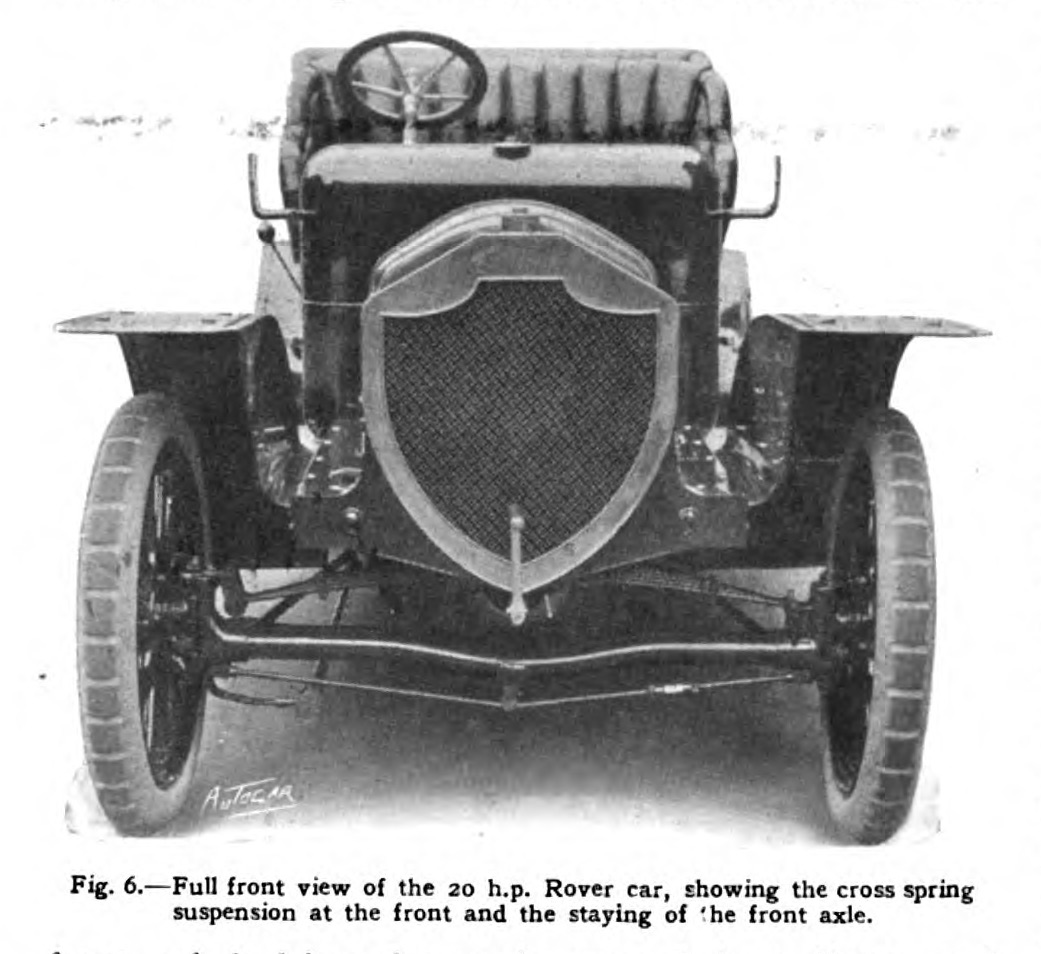
Rover's system of front suspension

The chassis was suspended from the front axle at just one point by a pivoted transverse leaf spring which made no contribution to transverse stability and the whole car rested on just three points. Radius rods from the gearbox take up braking strains and act as distance stays for the back axle. The front end of these stays have buffer springs The foot brake is the contracting band type, the hand brake is of the pull-on internal expanding type. Both sets of brake are metal to metal. The action of the engine brake avoids much use of the conventional braking system. The rear springs attach by means of a spherical case clipping over a spherical turned part of the axle casing thus allowing a little motion due to bumps.

The chassis is built up from steel flitch plates over ash to give the necessary strength with flexibility.

=== Engine controls ===
A pair of Autoloc levers move over the top of the steering wheel. They operate the throttle and ignition. A pedal controls the engine braking system. Road tests as late as 1911 noted how Rover cars lacked accelerator pedals.

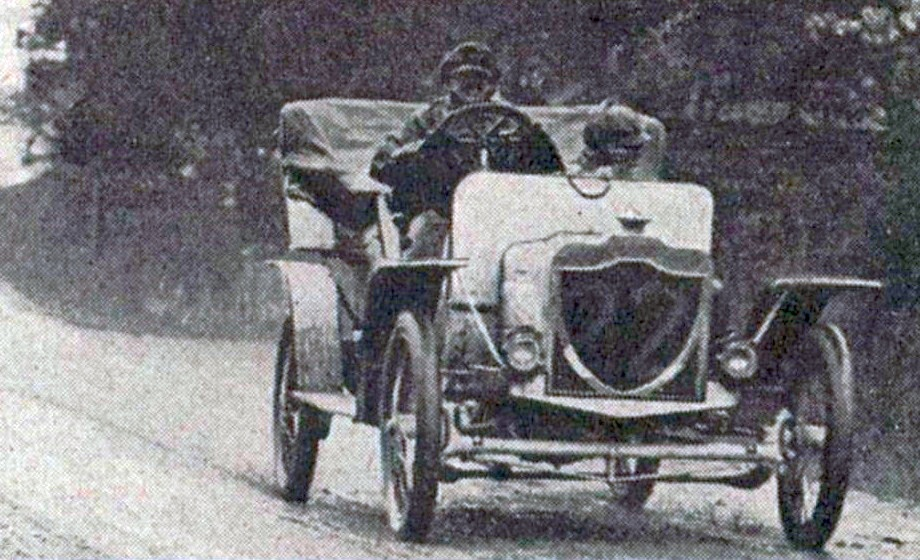
Winning the RAC Tourist Trophy 1907

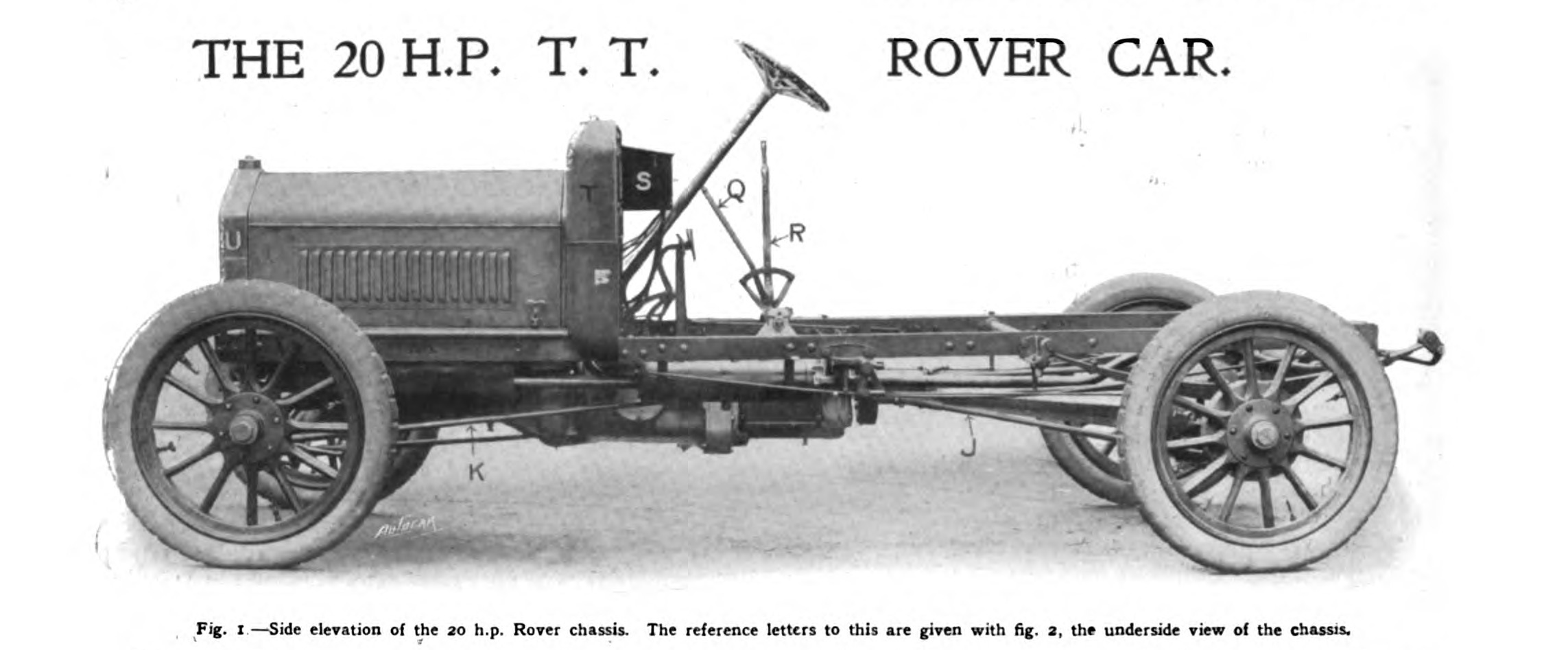

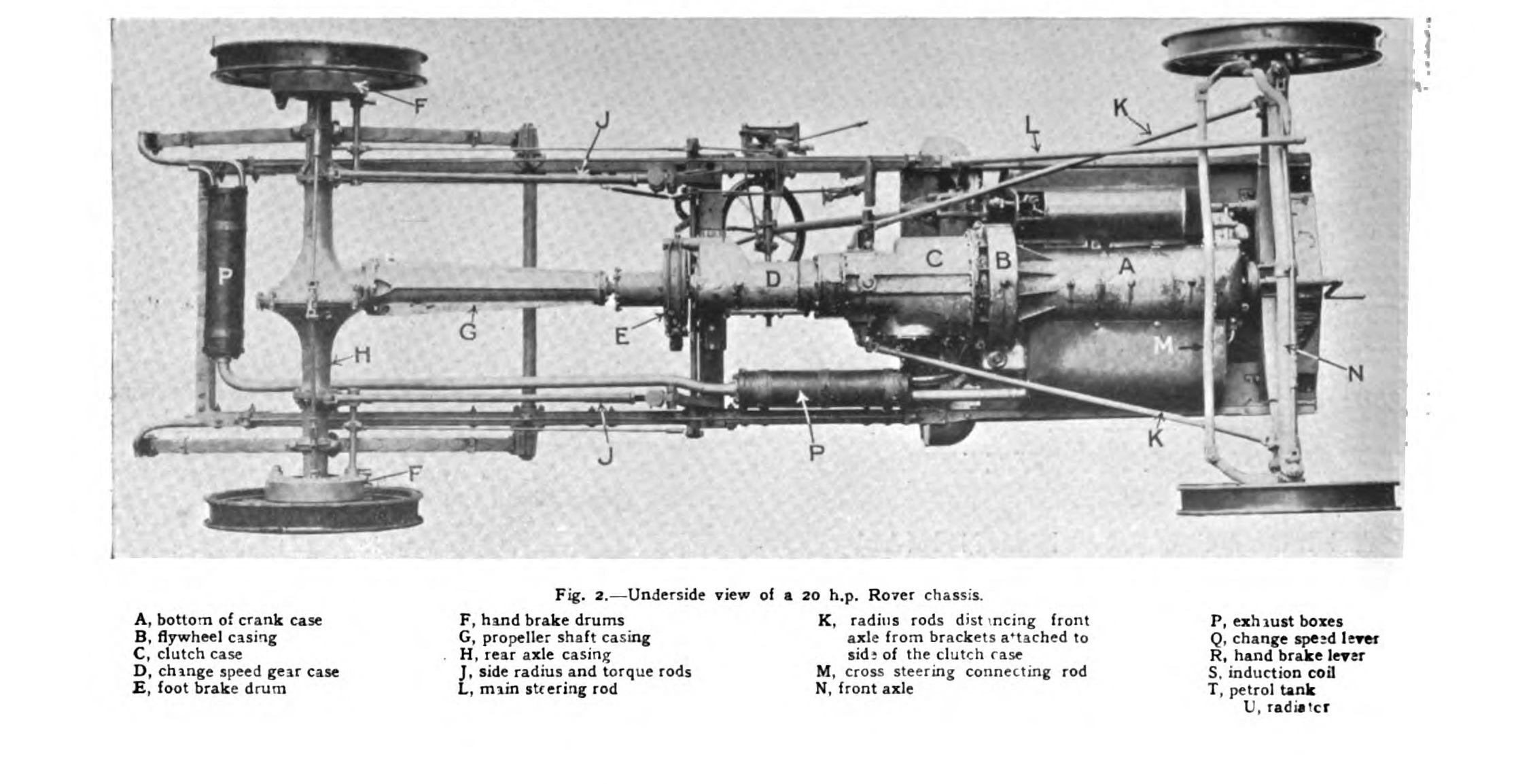

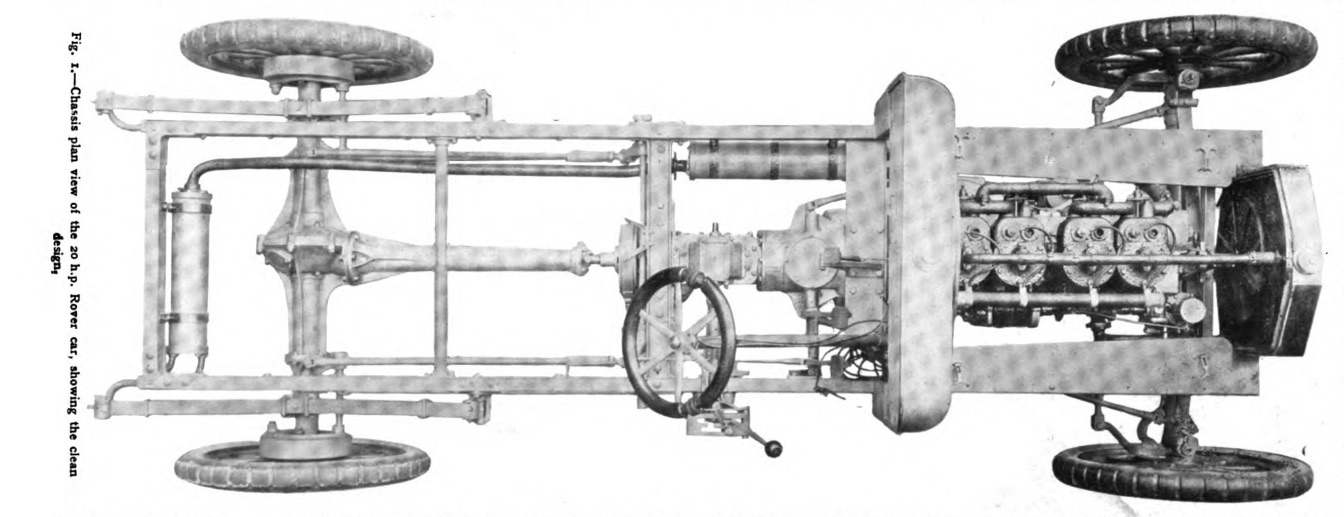

== 1930 Light Twenty ==
This car was fitted with a Rover Meteor 20 hp engine but otherwise was identical with the Rover Two-litre Sportsman's coupé

Rover Speed Twenty

Overview
- Manufacturer: Rover
- Production: 1933–1935
- Model years: 1934–1935

Body and chassis
- Layout: FR

Powertrain
- Engine: 2565 cc Straight-6

Dimensions
- Wheelbase: 111 in (2,800 mm); ’’’Track’’’ 51 in (1,300 mm)
- Length: 172.5 in (4,380 mm)
- Width: 61 in (1,500 mm)
- Kerb weight: Saloon 19½ cwt, 2,184 lb (991 kg)

Rover 20

Overview
- Manufacturer: Rover

Layout
- Configuration: Straight 6-cylinder
- Displacement: 2,565 cc (157 cu in)
- Cylinder bore: 72 mm (2.8 in)
- Piston stroke: 105 mm (4.1 in)

Output
- Power output: 72 bhp (54 kW; 73 PS) @x rpm; Tax horsepower 19.28

== 1933 Speed Twenty ==
From 1933 the Rover Speed 20 was made, variously as a Weymann saloon, coachbuilt saloon, sportsman's coupé, Hastings coupé, and a 4-seat tourer.

== 1936 Speed Twenty ==
Some 641 examples of the 1936 Speed Twenty were built before the production run halted in 1940.

== Rover 20 P2 (1939) ==
Rover 20 P2

Overview
- Manufacturer: Rover

Body and chassis
- Body style: sports saloon; drophead coupé
- Layout: FR

Rover 20

Layout
- Configuration: Straight 6-cylinder
- Displacement: 2,512 cc (153 cu in)
- Cylinder bore: 73 mm (2.9 in)
- Piston stroke: 100 mm (3.9 in)

Output
- Power output: not published; Tax horsepower 19.82
