= Startix =

Automatic engine starting mechanism

The Startix automatic engine starting mechanism was a relay in a small box added to the vehicle's electrical system. It automatically started an engine from cold or if stalled. It was supplied to vehicle manufacturers in the mid 1930s and later as an aftermarket accessory — in the USA by Bendix Aviation Corporation Eclipse Machine Division and in UK by Joseph Lucas & Son both of which businesses made electric self-starters. Such devices are now part of the engine management systems which switch off and on to conserve fuel.

== Operation ==
The switching on of the ignition starts the engine and, in addition, automatically restarts the engine whenever it stalls, as long as the ignition is switched on.

As soon as the ignition is switched on current flows to the first Startix solenoid and current flows from battery to starter. The generator delivers current once the engine starts and part of it goes to a second Startix solenoid that switches off the current from battery to starter. If the engine and generator stop, then that second solenoid switches on the current from the battery to the starter. There are many further refinements associated with the plain relay.

== Market ==
It was marketed in the 1930s particularly for cars with then fashionable free-wheel manual transmissions but carburation problems led to automobile manufacturers soon dropping them as original equipment. They continued as an aftermarket accessory for cars with automatic transmissions into the middle years of the 20th century.

=== Free-wheeling ===
In the absence of a complete lock-up of the transmission of power between engine and wheels a car engine might die while idling. Even on a gentle long descent the driver might be unaware of engine failure until power was required and it could be dangerous particularly if braking-assistance depended on the engine and the reservoir or reserves proved inadequate.

=== False sense of security ===
Poorly adjusted engines could easily flood with fuel when attempting to restart while coasting and become unusable until dried out. Fuel management has since become so sophisticated this ceased to be a problem with the introduction of high quality fuel injection systems.

=== Automatic transmission ===
There was the appeal of the "power everything" car which automatically started its engine. Many early automatics had no lock up of their transmission, for example Dynaflow, Powerglide and Ultramatic though Hydramatic did.

== Vehicle manufacturers ==
These US manufacturers provided Startix as original equipment during the 1930s:

- Pierce-Arrow
- Packard
- Hudson
- Lincoln
- Studebaker
- Auburn
- Franklin
- Essex
- Willys
- Durant
- Cord

Singer 14hp / Rover 1933-36
