= Rover Two-litre =

Overview
- Manufacturer: Rover
- Production: 1927–1932 approx 8000 made.

Body and chassis
- Class: Midsize car
- Body style: 2 or 3-seater open tourer; 5-seater open tourer; Weymann Paris, Riviera or Braunston 5-seater saloon; coachbuilt saloon; sportsman's coupé; sportsman's saloon; limousine; chassis only

Powertrain
- Engine: 2 L (2023 cc) straight-6
- Transmission: 3-plate clutch with cork inserts. three speed gearbox controlled by central lever, enclosed propeller shaft - bearing midway in torque tube, spiral bevel final drive, half-floating axle.

Dimensions
- Wheelbase: 118 in (2,997 mm)
- Length: 178 in (4,521 mm) (depends on body)
- Width: 63 in (1,600 mm) (depends on body)
- Kerb weight: chassis only 18 cwt 2,016 lb (914 kg); Weymann saloon 26 cwt, 2,912 lb (1,321 kg)

Rover 2-litre

Overview
- Manufacturer: Rover

Layout
- Configuration: straight-six pushrod ohv
- Displacement: 2,023 cc (123.5 cu in)
- Cylinder bore: 65 mm (2.6 in)
- Piston stroke: 101.6 mm (4.0 in)
- Cylinder block material: cast iron
- Cylinder head material: cast iron detachable
- Valvetrain: overhead valves, pushrods, single springs, camshaft in crankcase silent chain drive

Combustion
- Fuel system: twin carburettors, vacuum feed, 12-gallon tank at back
- Management: distributor driven from camshaft
- Fuel type: petrol
- Oil system: there is pressure lubrication to every engine bearing. clutch and gearbox share oil with engine
- Cooling system: honeycomb radiator in a shell with stone-guard, fan and water impeller driven from crankshaft, thermostat

Output
- Power output: 60 bhp (45 kW; 61 PS) @3,600 rpm; Tax horsepower 15.7

Chronology
- Successor: Rover Meteor

The Rover Two-litre was a mid-size luxury open tourer, saloon or limousine produced from 1927 by the Rover Company of Coventry and available through to 1932. The chassis was also available to coach builders.

The 16 hp Two-litre was supplemented by then later replaced by the more expensive and better equipped 2-litre Rover Meteor 16 announced in February 1930.

== Overview ==
Announced in September 1927 the Rover Two-litre was one of the Rover cars manufactured when Spencer and Maurice Wilks, who joined Rover's team in 1929 and 1930, and introduced new management practices and engineering techniques to Rover.

== Engine ==
The Two-litre was powered by a watercooled 2 L straight-6 OHV engine with an output of 45 bhp at 3600 rpm designed by Peter Poppe, which allowed a maximum speed of 60 mph (97 km/h). The bore of 65 mm put the engine into the 16 hp taxation class. Poppe's new engine became the basis for all but one of the Rover engines until the new design introduced with Rover's P3 in 1948.

The car was supplied with a three-speed gearbox controlled by a lever in the centre of the car. The lever was flexible, operated in a gate and had a stop to avoid engaging reverse.

The engine clutch and gearbox assembly is mounted and supported at three points, the single one in front, the rear pair by horizontally U-shaped leaf spring attachments.

== Brakes suspension steering ==
The suspension was conventional for the time with half elliptic leaf springs all round mounted above the axles. The pedal brakes work shoes in enclosed drums on all four wheels by rods but the handbrake uses those on the back wheels and operates them by chain. There are shock absorbers fore and aft.

== Body ==
As with its predecessors standard bodies were very light weight rattle free fabric bodywork built by Rover under licence from Weymann. The standard 2/3-seater or 5-seater open tourer 2-litre was introduced at a price of £410. A short wheelbase two-door "Sportsman's Saloon" version became available during the last two years of production for £335. All cars became available with a 4-speed gearbox as an optional extra for £7, it was a standard fitting to the limousine.

The clutch pedal is adjustable for travel and the front seat can be adjusted over a range of six inches using wing nuts in the cushion.

The short-wheelbase narrow track sportsman's saloon variant of this Two-litre car, the Rover Light Six won attention when it was the first successful participant in the Blue Train Races, a series of record-breaking attempts between automobiles and trains in the late 1920s and early 1930s. It saw a number of motorists and their own or sponsored automobiles race against the Le Train Bleu, a train that ran between Calais and the French Riviera.
