= Rover P6BS =

Car prototype

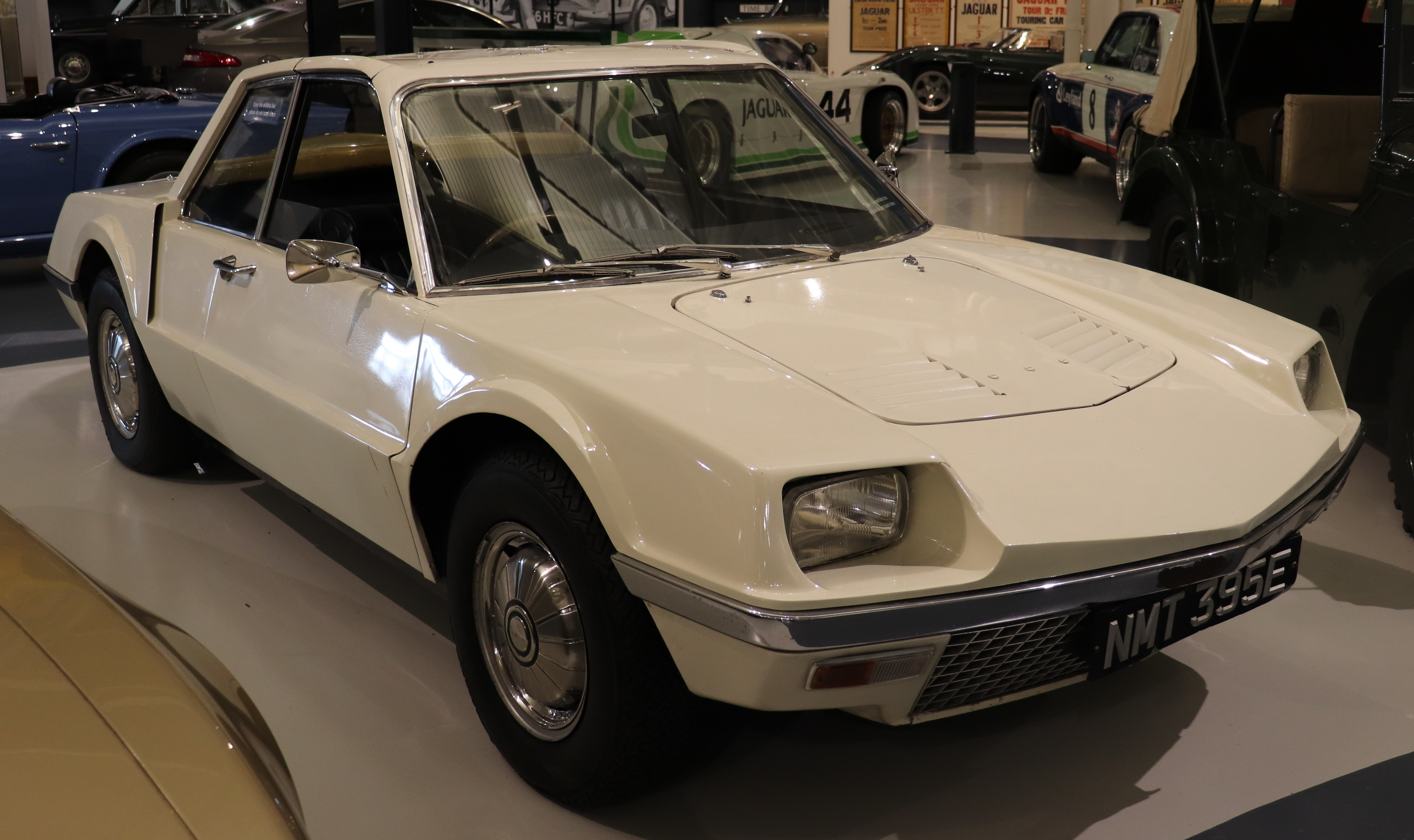
Rover P6BS in the British Motor Museum

Rover P6BS a.k.a. Leyland Eight GE (Group experimental) was a prototype from Rover for a mid-engines sports car. Rover had a Buick V8 and after some work on it was finished in 1967 and was planned to go into Rover P5B and P6B, but the engineers wanted something sportier and had already started a project on the side. The team headed by David Bache created an advanced coupé with the V8 mounted in the middle, but offset to the right. The reason for this was that the gearbox was in front of the engine and this placement allowed the transaxle to be run on the side of the engine and thus making the car lower. It has three seats. Most of the work was done at Alvis and it was speculated it would be a new Alvis. It was designed to be production ready and it even got a preliminary price tag, in a US press release it said the cost would be US$5000. The test drivers loved it. It never entered production, but the project lived on as the never made Rover P9.
