= Outback Challenge =

Australian off-roading event

The Outback Challenge is an off-roading event that takes place in the sheep stations surrounding Broken Hill, New South Wales, Australia. It is an amateur event where competitors in specially built four-wheel drives compete in a number of trials which address all aspects of off-roading, including navigation, vehicular recovery, vehicle maintenance and bush survival as well as off-road driving skills.

The first Challenge started in 1999, and has attracted competitors from all over Australia and overseas with competitors from New Zealand, Malaysia, United States, Great Britain, France and the Canary Islands taking part. The event was discontinued in 2011 and replaced by Australian Outback 4x4 Extreme, but was discontinued after its first year. The event will return in 2014 under new management in October, away from its traditional May date.

== Winners ==
| Year | Driver | Co-driver | Car |
|---|---|---|---|
| 1999 | Mike Smith | Wayne Smith | Range Rover Classic |
| 2000 | Trent Leen | David Hickman | Ford Maverick |
| 2001 | Steven Tjepkema | Steven Hudson | Range Rover Classic |
| 2002 | Alan McMullen | Stuart Blegg | Jeep Wrangler |
| 2003 | Mike Smith | Wayne Smith | Range Rover Classic |
| 2004 | Steven Tjepkema | Steven Hudson | Range Rover Classic |
| 2005 | Norm Walters | Kym Bolton | Nissan GQ Patrol |
| 2006 | Rohan Canavan | Wayne Smith | Nissan GQ Patrol |
| 2007 | Todd Robards | Ivan Vella | Nissan GQ Patrol |
| 2008 | Adrian Parker | Alan McGilvrey | Nissan GU Patrol |
| 2009 | Greg Scanlon | Liam Nunns | Nissan GQ Patrol |
| 2010 | Peter Milhaillof | Clinton Sharpe | Nissan GQ Patrol |
| | Australian Outback 4x4 Extreme | | |
| 2011 | Peter Milhaillof | Clinton Sharpe | Nissan GQ Patrol |
| 2012 - 2013 | Not held | | |
| | Outback Challenge | | |
| 2014 | Neil Cooper | Chris Hummer | Nissan GQ Patrol |
