= Rover 60 =

Two different automobile lines from Rover have included a Rover 60 model:

- Rover P3, 1948–1949
- Rover P4, 1953–1959
