= Range Rover (P38A) =

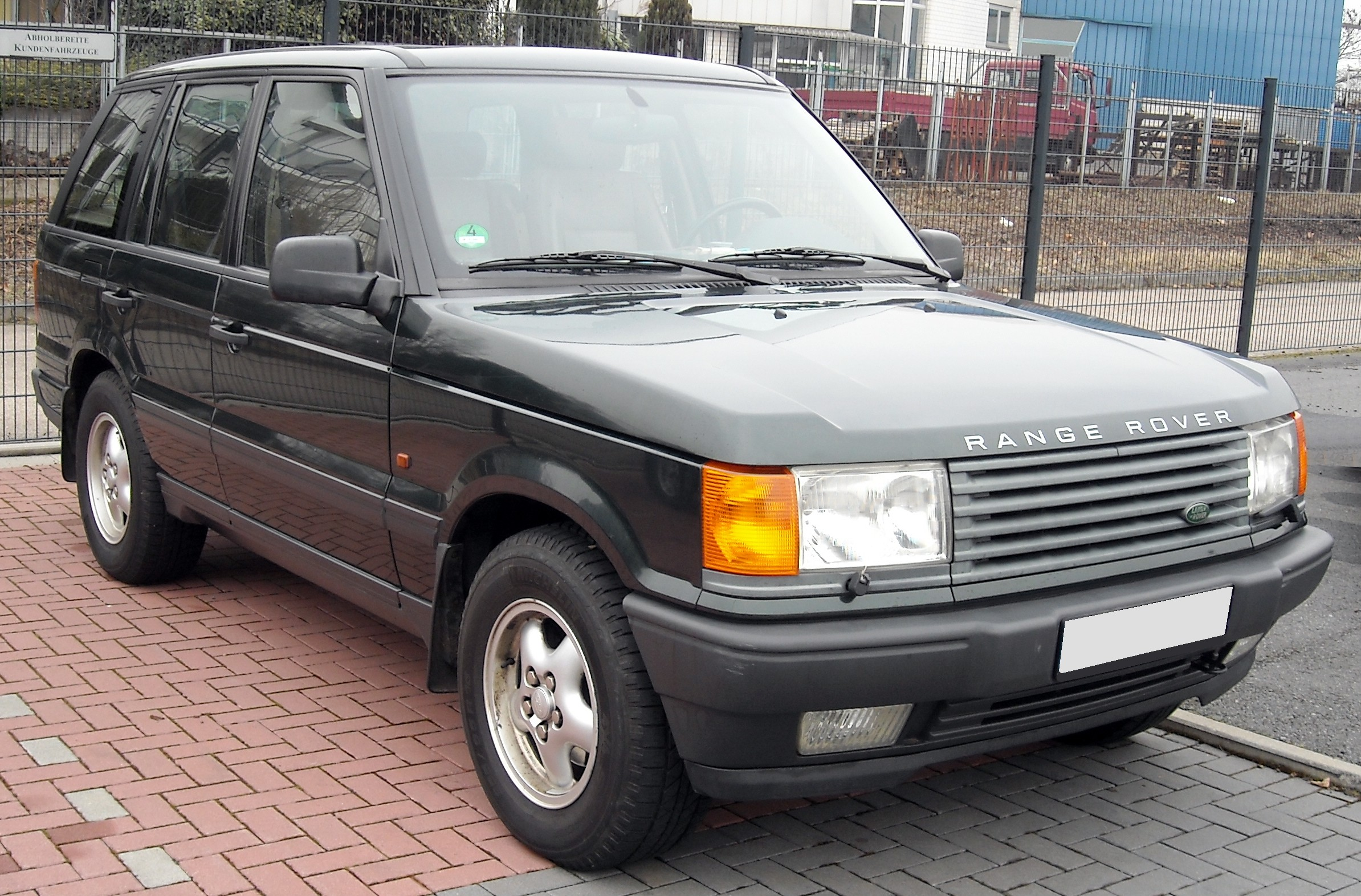
- 1995–1998 Land Rover Range Rover (P38A)

Overview
- Manufacturer: Land Rover (BMW)
- Model code: LP
- Production: September 1994–2001; 167,259 produced
- Assembly: United Kingdom: Solihull (Solihull plant)
- Designer: George Thomson (1990)

Body and chassis
- Class: Full-size luxury SUV
- Body style: 5-door SUV
- Layout: Longitudinal front-engine, four-wheel drive
- Related: Bentley Dominator

Powertrain
- Engine: Petrol; 4.0 L Rover V8; 4.6 L Rover V8; Diesel; 2.5 L BMW M51 turbo I6
- Transmission: 4-speed ZF automatic 5-speed ZF manual

Dimensions
- Wheelbase: 2,746 mm (108.1 in)
- Length: 4,712 mm (185.5 in)
- Width: 1,890 mm (74.4 in)
- Height: 1,819 mm (71.6 in)

Chronology
- Predecessor: Range Rover "Classic"
- Successor: Range Rover (L322)

The Range Rover (P38A) is the second-generation Range Rover model from British car maker Land Rover. It was launched on 28 September 1994, 24 years after the introduction of the Range Rover Classic. It included an updated version of the Rover V8 engine, with the option of a 2.5-litre BMW six-cylinder turbo-diesel. The new model offered more equipment and premium trims, positioning the vehicle above the Land Rover Discovery to face the increased competition in the SUV marketplace.

It is usually known as the Range Rover P38 or P38A outside of Land Rover, after the office building in which the vehicle development team was based. During the early development stages, the Engineering team was based in the Engineering Block at Solihull, and the vehicle was known by the project designations of 'Pegasus' and 'Discovery,' changing to P38A when the team moved to Block 38A at Solihull. The name 'Discovery' was used temporarily as a cover to confuse journalists while the original Discovery vehicle was being developed. During production, Land Rover referred to it as either the 'New Range Rover' or by its model designation of 'LP'.

Motoring journalist Jeremy Clarkson has on record called the P38A Range Rover the "London Taxi" in a jocular/derogatory sense owing to its perceived styling similarity to the Metrocab.

== Specifications ==
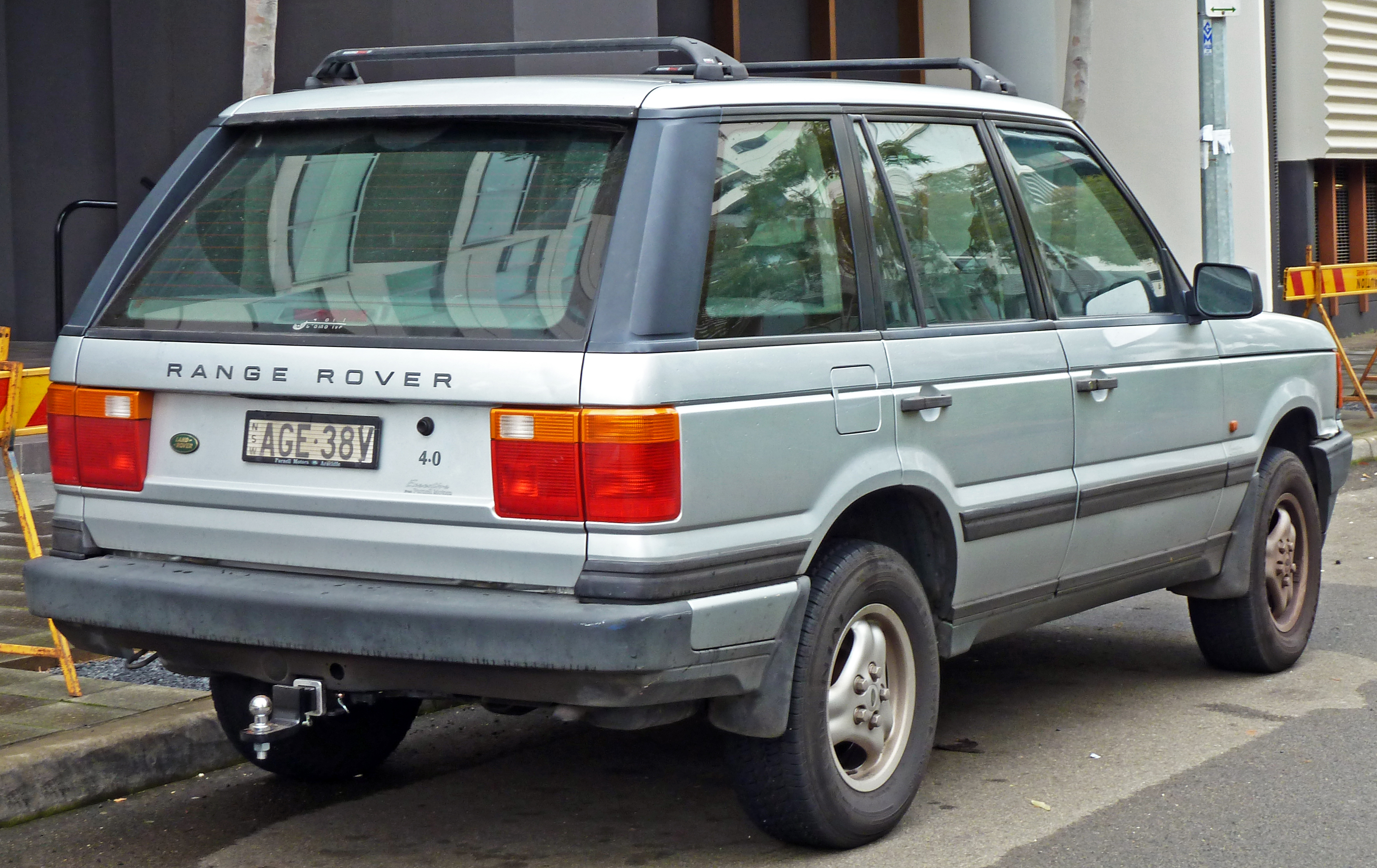
1998–1999 Land Rover Range Rover rear view

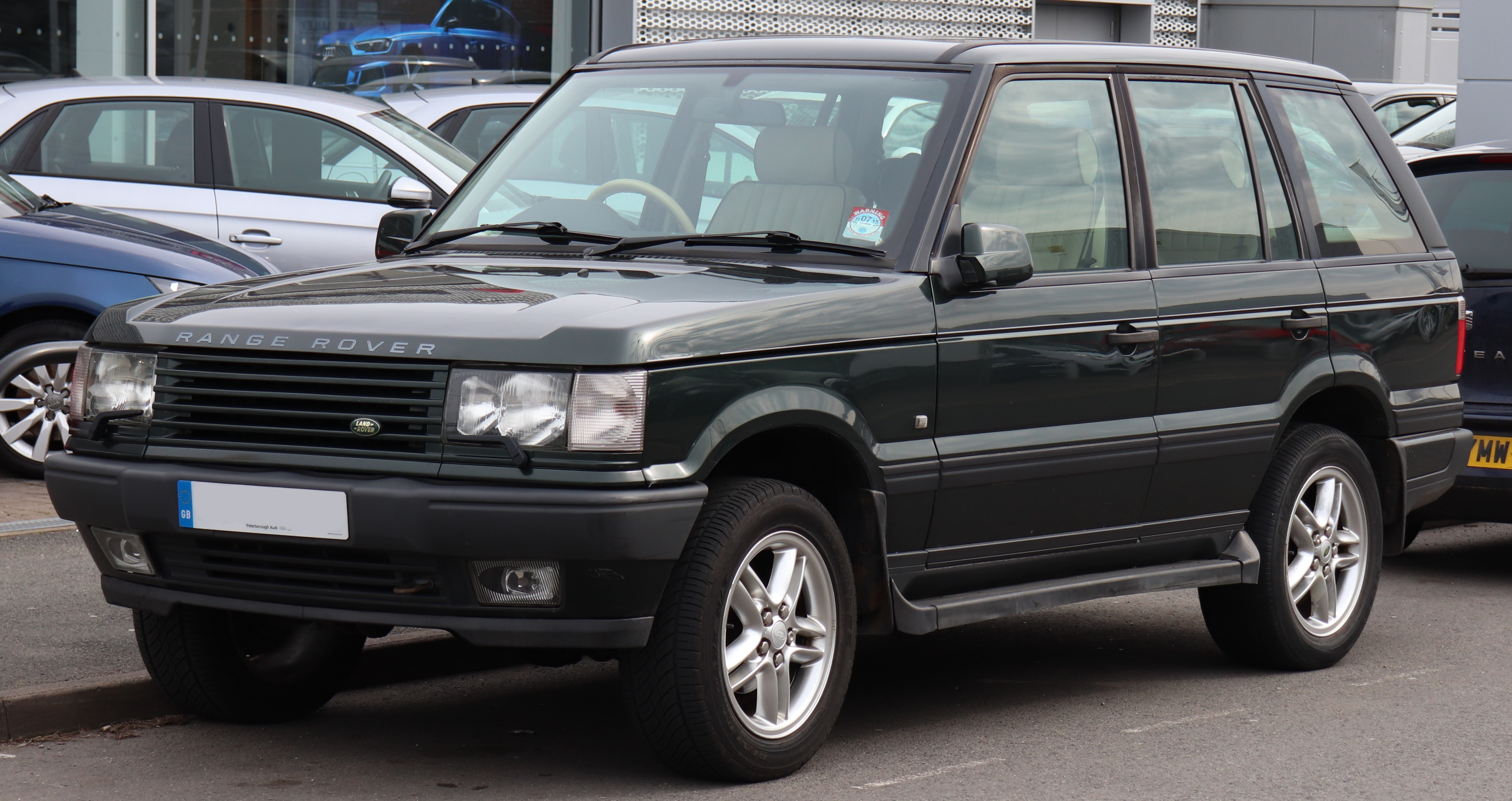
2000 Land Rover Range Rover Vogue

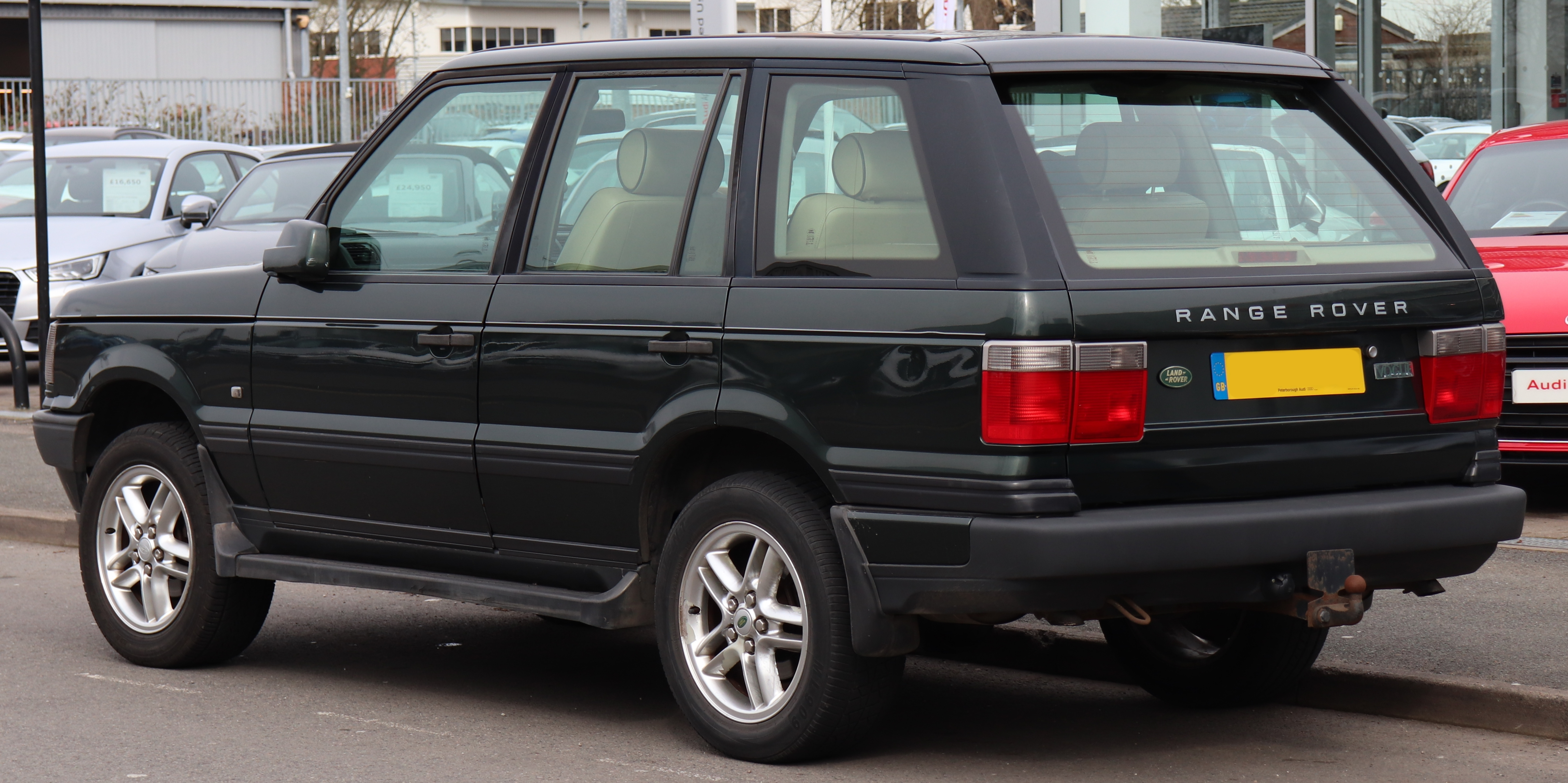
2000 Land Rover Range Rover Vogue rear

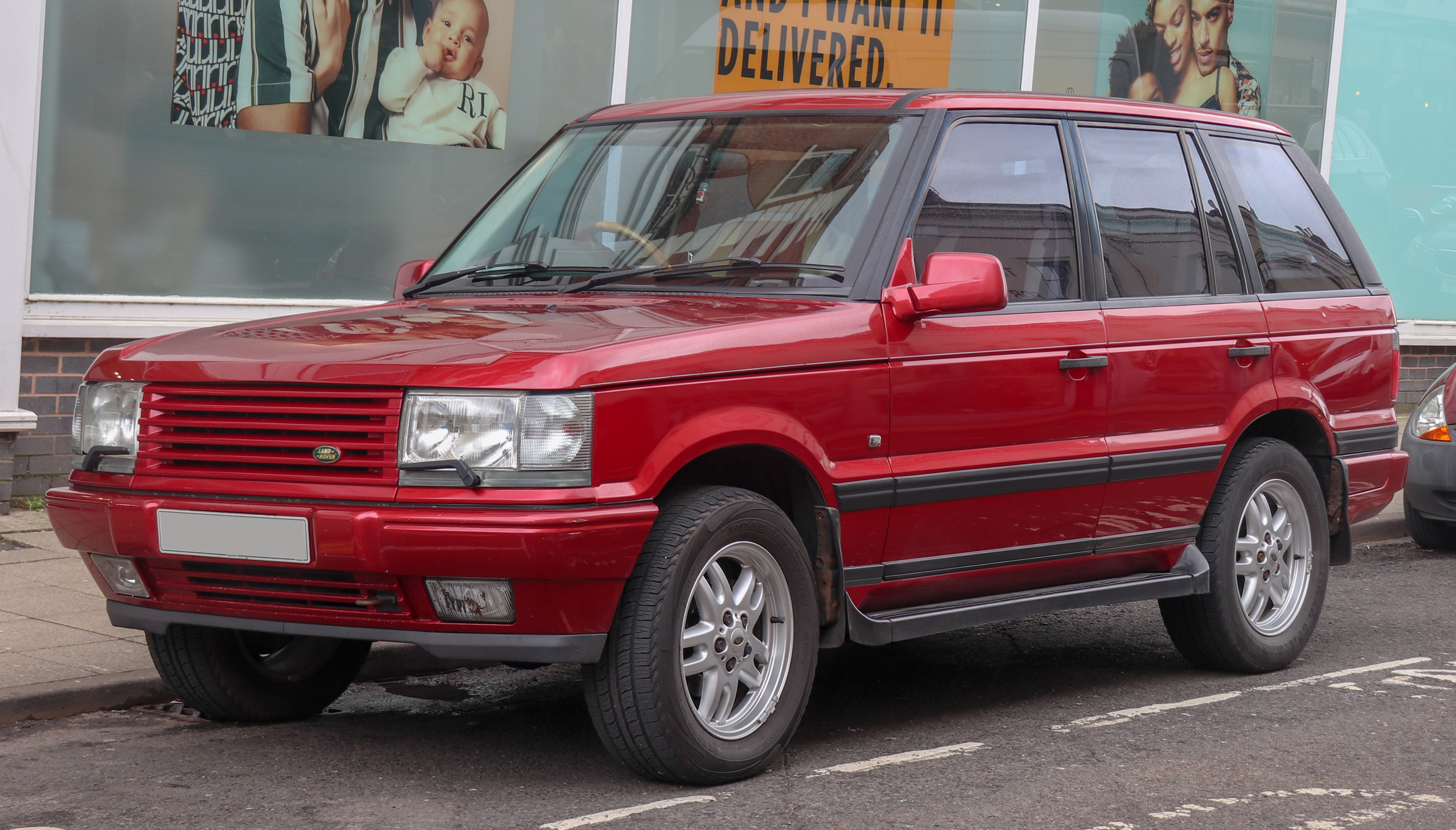
1998 Land Rover Range Rover Limited Edition Autobiography

=== Engine ===
In 1999, the Range Rover V8 received a new Bosch Motronic engine management system from the BMW 7 Series (E38). This replaced the Lucas "SAGEM" GEMS system. This engine is also known as the Bosch or Thor engine the later engine also featured revised engine mounts along with a structural alloy sump to stiffen the engine up to help improve refinement and prevent vibration ingress into the cabin. It can easily be identified by its intake manifold.

Behind the scenes there were two V12 prototypes in the works. This project never reached production and was shelved. The P38 would have used the 5.4-litre BMW M73 from the BMW 750i and was intended to further increase the luxury image.

=== Petrol ===
==== GEMS "Lucas" (pre–1999) ====
- 4.0-litre V8 making 190 hp (142 kW) at 4750 rpm and 320 N⋅m (236 lb⋅ft) of torque at 3200 rpm
- 4.6-litre V8 making 230 hp (172 kW) at 4750 rpm and 380 N⋅m (280 lb⋅ft) of torque at 3200 rpm

==== Bosch "Motronic" (post–1999) ====
- 4.0-litre V8 making 188 hp (140 kW) at 4750 rpm and 339 N⋅m (250 lb⋅ft) of torque at 2600 rpm
- 4.6-litre V8 making 218 hp (163 kW) at 4750 rpm and 407 N⋅m (300 lb⋅ft) of torque at 2600 rpm

=== Diesel ===
- 2.5-litre BMW M51 I6 making 136 hp (101 kW) at 4400 rpm and 270 N⋅m (199 lb⋅ft) of torque at 2300 rpm running a Mitsubishi TD04-11G-4 Turbocharger

Early cars (1994–1998) used an aluminium inlet manifold.

After 1998 the diesel edition received an EGR system, which came with a plastic inlet manifold. A modulator sends back part of the exhaust gas into the manifold, thus mixing hot exhaust gas via a vacuum pump into the cold air from the intercooler. Post '98 cars also utilised a MAF sensor for better economy and cleaner running.

=== Suspension ===
The second generation Range Rover incorporated an improved electronic air suspension (called EAS) which was an adaption of the system used on the 1993–1996 Range Rover Classic. It allows automatic, speed determined height adjustment. The five suspension heights offered by EAS are (from lowest to highest in terms of height) "Access", "Motorway", "Standard", "Off-Road", and "Off-Road Extended". Height was also adjustable manually between the first four settings. The "Off-Road Extended" setting was only accessible automatically by the EAS ECU in the event of the chassis getting beached.

=== Transmission ===
The 4.0 L V8 petrol and the 2.5 L I6 diesel engine were mated to either the R380 manual gearbox or the ZF 4HP22 transmission, as used in the late classic Range Rover, 300 TDi, TD5 or V8 Discoverys. The 4.6 L V8 petrol engine was only mated to the ZF 4HP24 transmission.

The R380 gearbox is basically the same as in the previous Range Rover, or Discovery 300tdi. The primary shaft for the diesel is different with a small input diameter for the spigot bearing inside the BMW flywheel and the output shaft has been changed to allow for the different BorgWarner box.

The BorgWarner 4462 transfer box on the P38 unlike the classic has no direct control of High/Low range gears meaning that the vehicle has to nearly stop before shifting from high to low range and the lever from the classic model was replaced by an electric control on the dashboard for the manual and an H-pattern gate on the automatic gear lever High/Low is selected by an electronic actuator on the TB. The transfer case's chain and sprockets have been reinforced. The rear differential on the 4.6 L V8 petrol model was a 4-pin version and four-wheel traction control was included with the vehicle, whereas initially the 4.0 L V8 and the 2.5 L I6 only had 2-pin versions and two-wheel traction control on the rear wheels only. Later versions had the four-wheel traction control and the later 4.6 L V8 petrol model had a 4-pin front differential.

=== Chassis ===
The chassis was also made stronger and new welding techniques were used, so unlike its predecessor, the chassis and body sections are not as prone to corrosion. This was the last Range Rover available with a manual gearbox and a classic transfer box. Other features included an anti-lock braking system and in some automatic gearbox models two-wheel traction control — although later models saw this feature applied to all four wheels.
