= Rover P3 =

Rover 60 Rover 75 P3 series
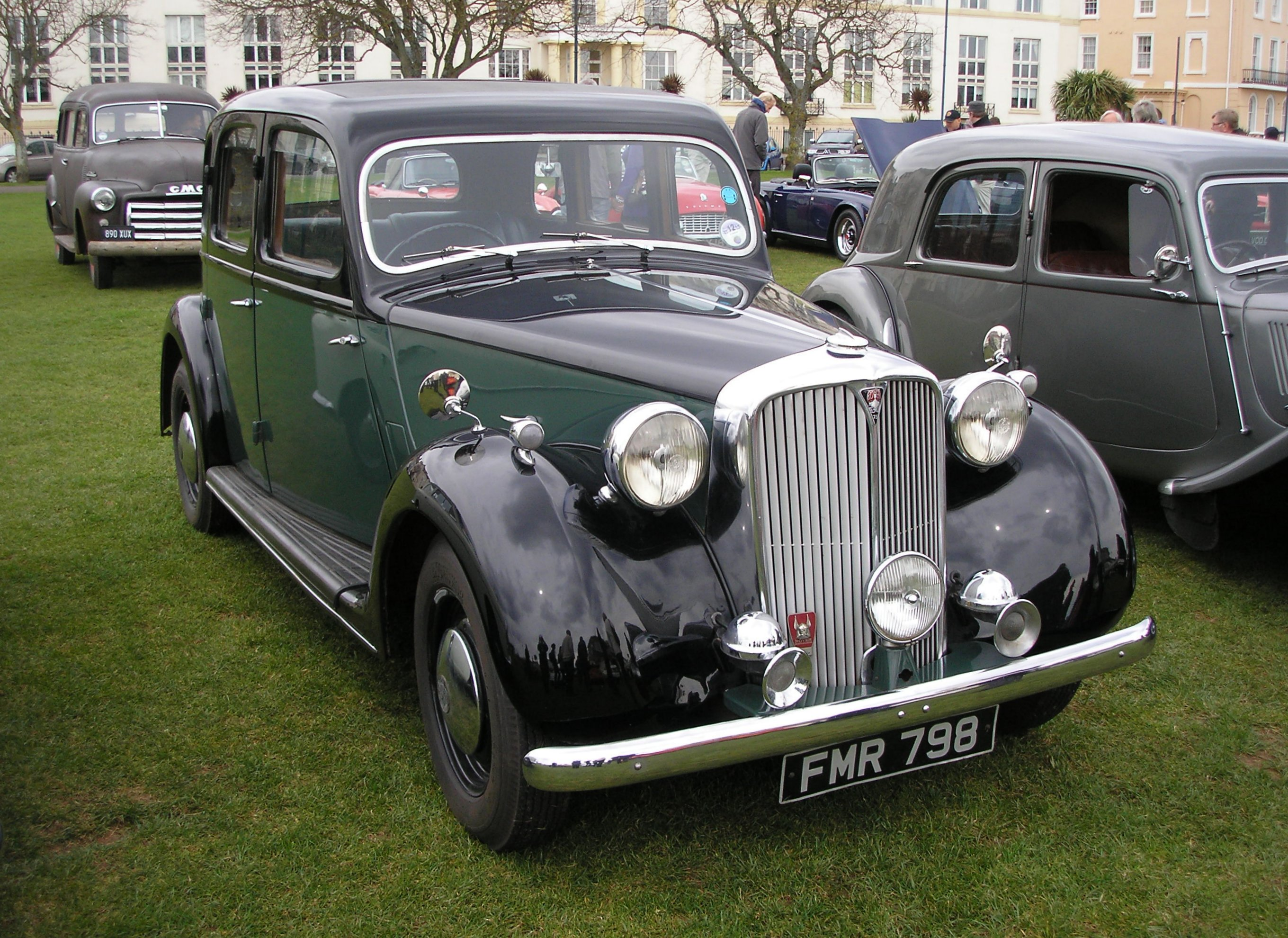
- Rover 75 6-light saloon registered November 1948

Overview
- Manufacturer: The Rover Company Limited
- Production: 1948–1949 (9,100 produced): 60, 6 light: 911; 60, 4 light: 363; 75, 6 light: 5196; 75, 4 light: 2630
- Assembly: United Kingdom: Solihull
- Designer: Gordon Bashford

Body and chassis
- Class: Executive car (E)
- Body style: 4-door 6-light saloon; 4-door 4-light sports saloon
- Layout: FR layout

Powertrain
- Engine: 1.6 L Straight-4; 2.1 L Straight-6
- Transmission: 4-speed manual

Dimensions
- Wheelbase: 110 in (2,794 mm)
- Length: 172 in (4,400 mm)
- Width: 65 in (1,700 mm)
- Height: 63 in (1,600 mm)
- Curb weight: 3,000 lb (1,400 kg) approxNews in Brief. The Times (London, England),

Chronology
- Predecessor: Rover 16
- Successor: Rover 75 (P4)

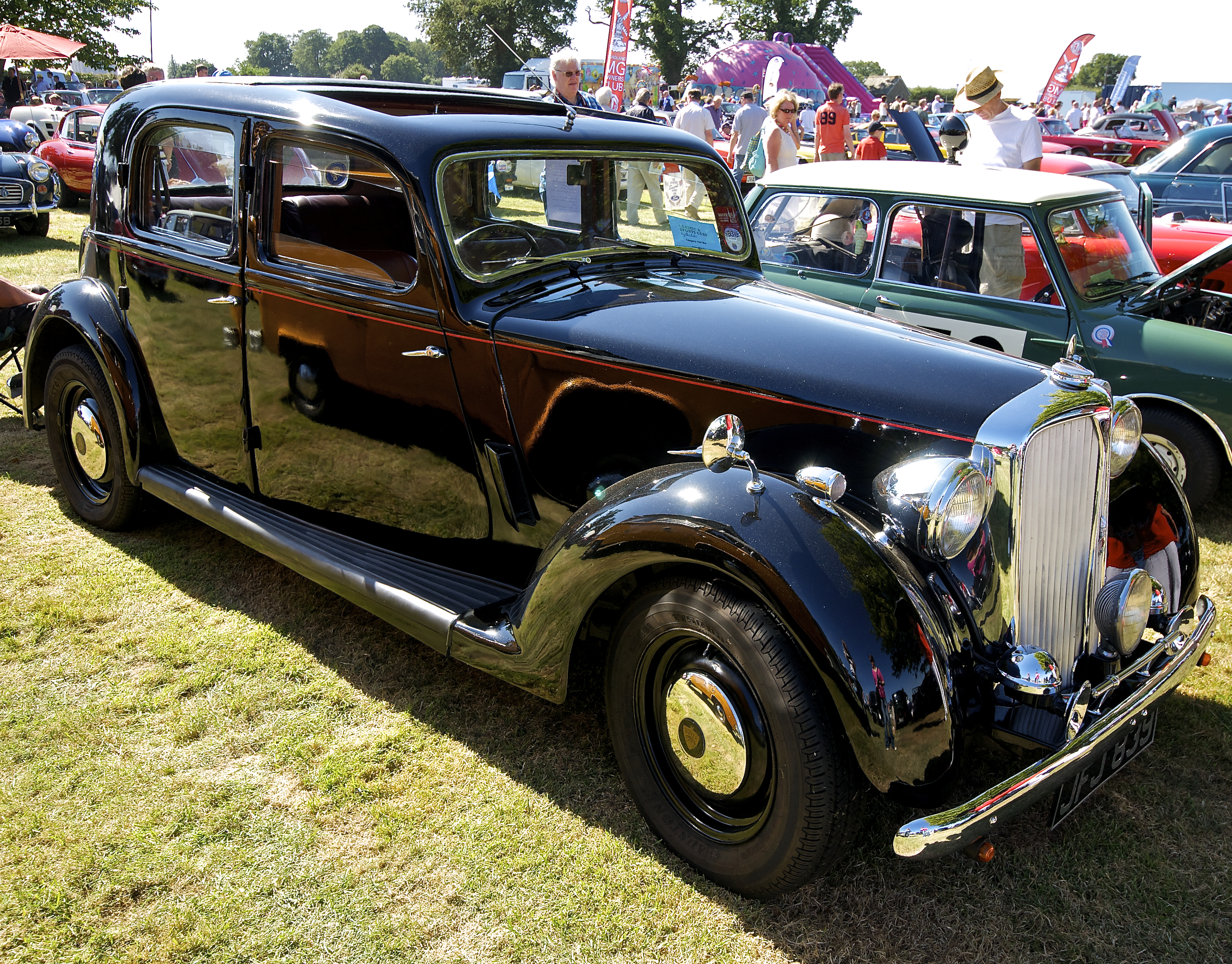
1949 60 sports saloon

The Rover Sixty and Rover Seventy-Five or Rover P3 series were 1.6 and 2.0-litre executive cars announced in the middle of February 1948 and produced by the Rover Company until the summer of 1949. Two months after the announcement of the new cars "a new vehicle for agriculture" was announced, the Land Rover, with the engine of the new Sixty.

== Overview ==
For the post-war market Rover had a new engine that had been in preparation since the late 1930s with overhead inlet and side exhaust valves. It was made in two versions for the car, the Rover 60 had a four-cylinder unit of 1595 cc and the Rover 75 had a six-cylinder version of 2103 cc. The gearbox and traditional Rover freewheel were kept unchanged from the previous model.

To go with the engine a new car was prepared. Although the body was similar in styling to the Rover 12 and 16, many of the body panels were in fact new but the wings and bonnet from the 12 were carried over. The car was 0.5 inch (12 mm) wider outside than the 16 but by making better use of space this translated to 2.5 inches (60 mm) inside. It was 4.5 inches (115 mm) shorter in the wheelbase. Also new, and a first for a Rover, was independent front suspension but the brakes remained a hydraulic/mechanical hybrid system. Rather than having a complete chassis, the new frame, which was a box section, was stopped short of the rear axle and the rear semi-elliptic springs were attached to the body. This allowed the rear axle travel to be increased and an improved ride resulted.

Two body styles were available, a 6-light saloon and 4-light sports saloon. The 6-light saloon had a rear quarter window (sometimes referred to a 6-window saloon) while the 4-light sports saloon had no rear quarter window (sometimes referred to a 4-window saloon).

The cars were expensive at £1080 for the Rover 60 and £1106 for the Rover 75, and because of early post-war production problems and material shortages it was never intended that the cars would be produced in large numbers. Eventually, 1274 60 and 7837 75 models were made before the car was replaced by the all-new Rover 75 (P4) at the end of September 1949; this was produced until 1959. (The '75' name was later used for Rover's 1999–2005 75 flagship).

== Powertrain ==
The engine and gearbox from the car were also used as the basis for those in the original Land Rover Series. About six "75" models were produced with triple SU carburettors – a throw back to Rover's pre-war 'Speed' performance models; one survivor has an over-bored 2,400 cc engine; the basis of the Marauder 100 engine.

Rover's new 75 was announced on 23 September 1949, it replaced this car.

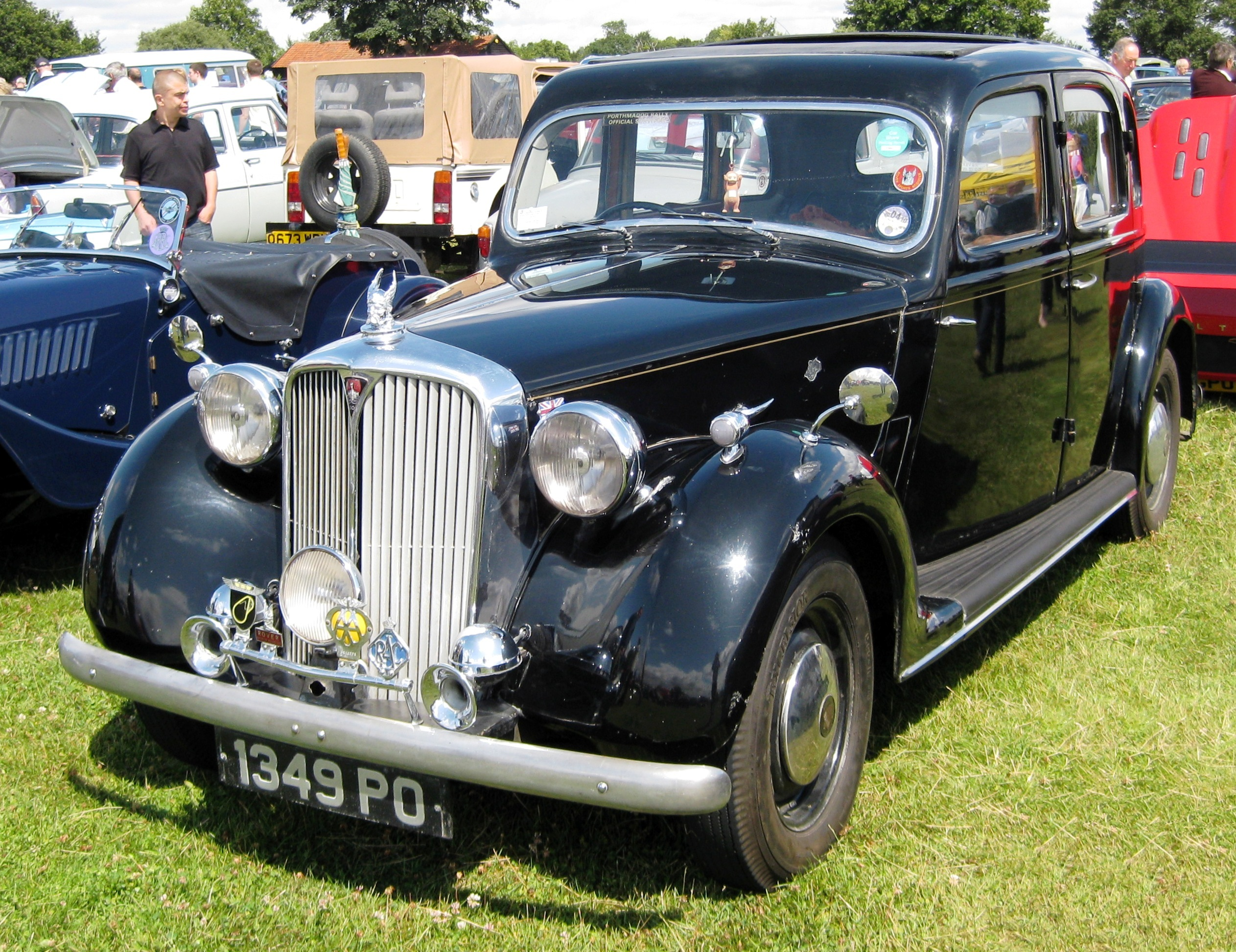
1948 60 6-light saloon

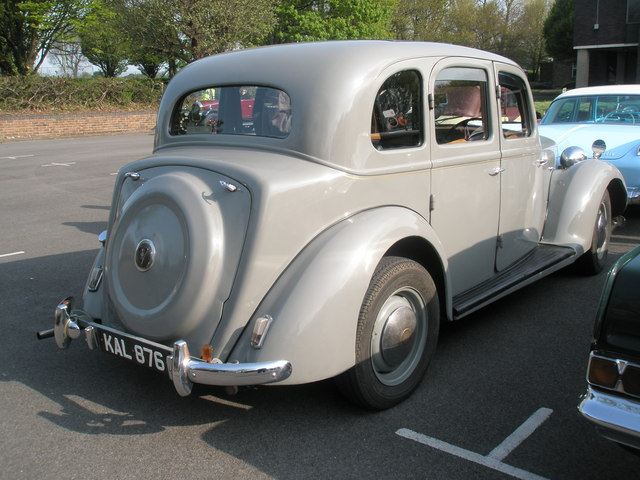
1949 75 6-light saloon

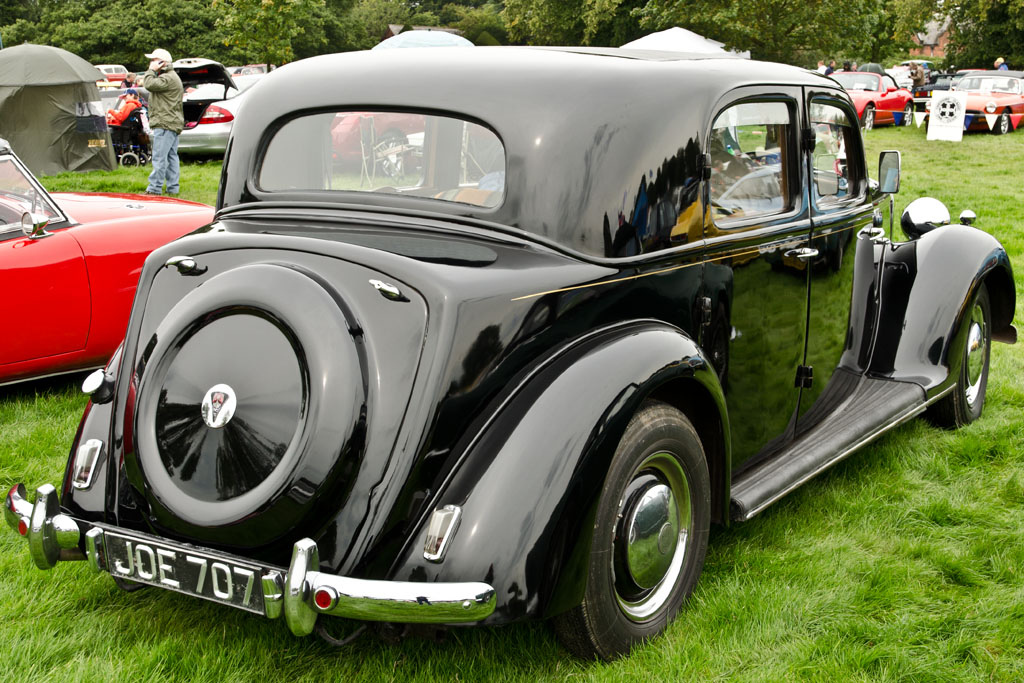
1948 75 sports saloon

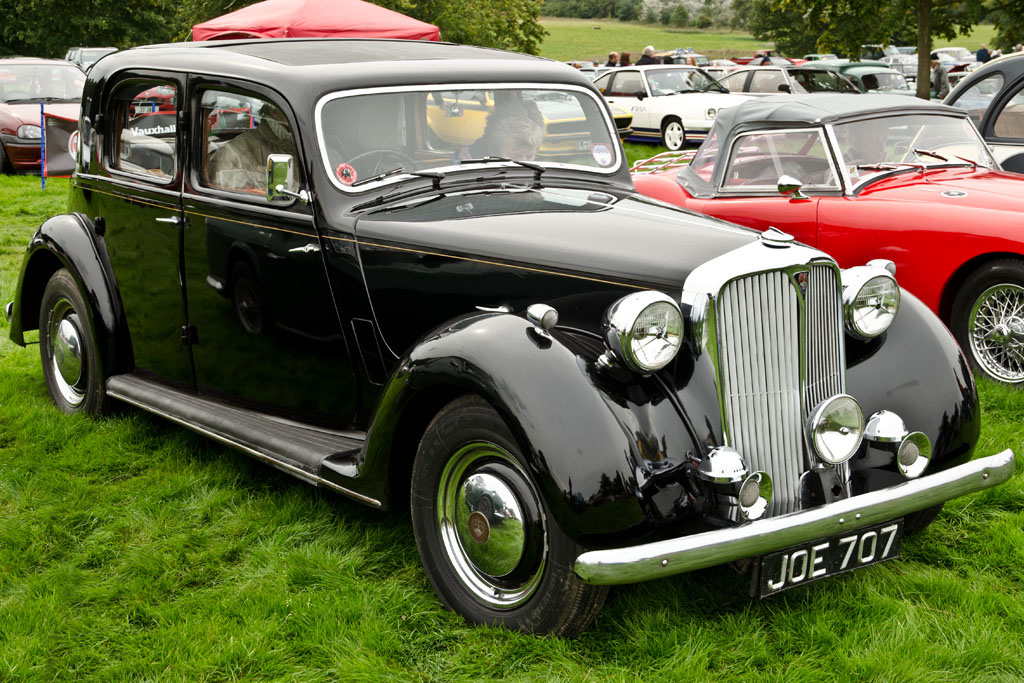
1948 75 sports saloon
