= Range Rover Classic =

Range Rover "Classic"
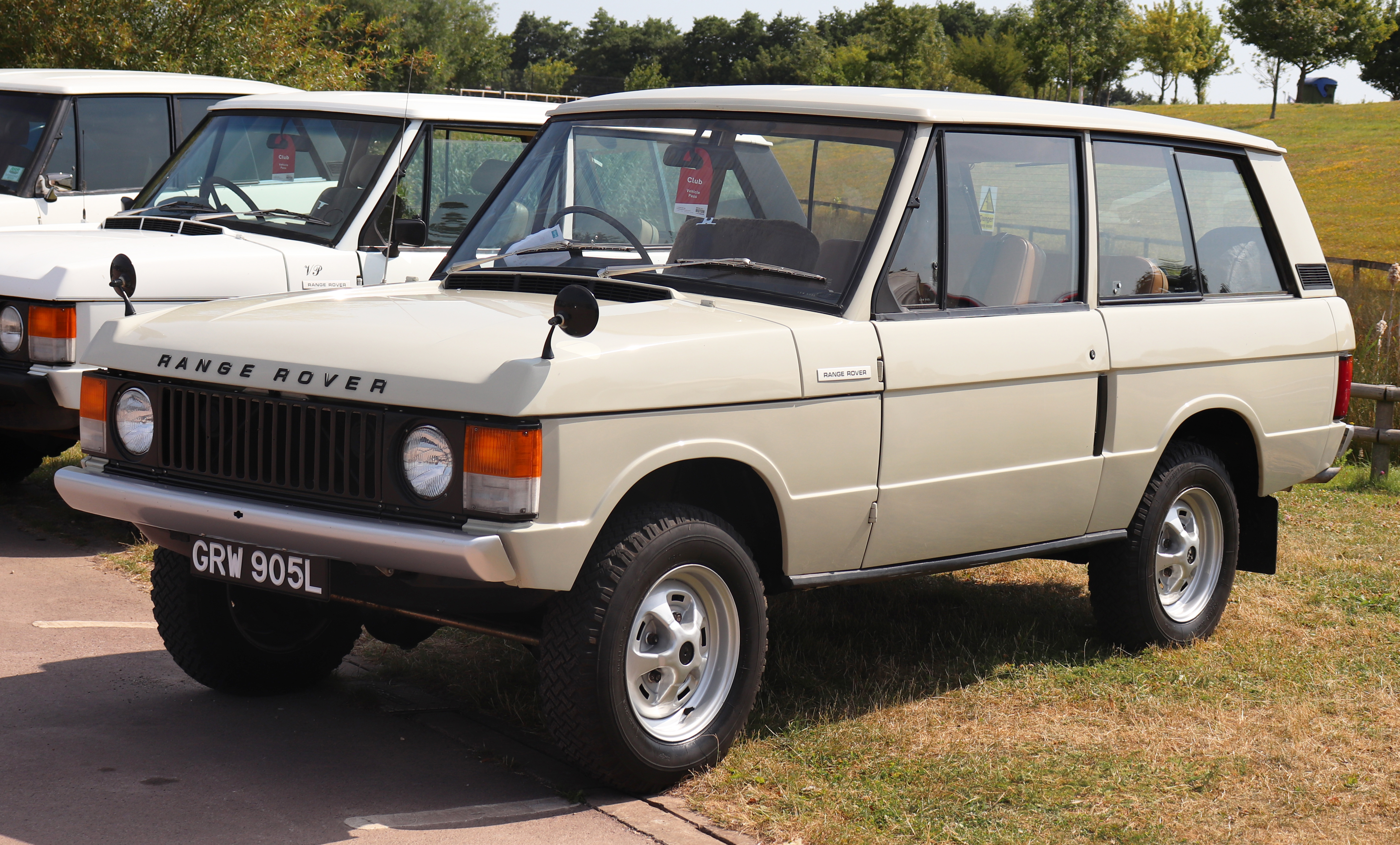
- 1973 Range Rover 3.5

Overview
- Manufacturer: British Leyland (1970–1978); Land Rover Ltd. (1978–1996)
- Production: 1970–1996; 326,070 produced
- Assembly: United Kingdom: Solihull (Solihull plant); Australia: Enfield (Leyland Australia); Venezuela: Las Tejerías (Tracto Agro)
- Designer: Spen King (1967); Gordon Bashford (1967); David Bache (1967)

Body and chassis
- Class: off-road vehicle
- Body style: 3/5-door off-road vehicle
- Related: Land Rover Discovery

Powertrain
- Engine: petrol: 3.5 L Rover V8; 3.9 L Rover V8; 4.2 L Rover V8; diesel: 2.4 L VM Motori TD I4; 2.5 L VM Motori TD I4; 2.5 L 200Tdi TD I4; 2.5 L 300Tdi TD I4
- Transmission: 4-speed manual (BL LT95); 5-speed manual (BL LT77); 3-speed automatic (Chrysler TorqueFlite A727); 4-speed automatic (ZF 4HP22)

Dimensions
- Wheelbase: 100.0 in (2,540 mm) (SWB); 108.0 in (2,743 mm) (LWB)
- Length: 175 in (4,445 mm) (SWB); 183 in (4,648 mm) (LWB)
- Width: 70.1 in (1,781 mm)
- Height: 70.9 in (1,801 mm) (1970–1980); 70.1 in (1,781 mm) (1980 onwards)

Chronology
- Successor: Range Rover

The Range Rover is a 4x4, mid-size off-road vehicle series produced from 1970 to 1996 – initially by the Rover (later Land Rover) division of British Leyland, and latterly by the Rover Group.

The first generation of vehicles produced under the Range Rover name, it was built as a two-door model for its first 11 years, until a four-door also became available in 1981. The Range Rover then successfully moved upmarket during the 1980s, and remarkably debuted in the U.S. as a 17-year old model at the 1987 Los Angeles Auto Show.

Availability of the two-door version was restricted from 1984, but it remained in production for some markets until 1994, when the second generation was launched. From that moment, Land Rover rebranded the original model under the term Range Rover Classic, to distinguish it from its new P38A successor, when the two were briefly built alongside, and applied the name retrospectively to all first-generation Range Rovers.

Although formally superseded by the second generation Range Rover, starting in 1994 – both the successor and the more affordable first and second series of the Land Rover Discovery were heavily based on the original Range Rover's chassis, drive-train and body-structure, which in essence lived on until the third generation Discovery arrived, and its mechanical blood-line ended with the replacement of the Mark 2 Discovery after 2004.

In early 2020, the 26-year production run of the original Range Rover was counted as the twenty-seventh most long-lived single generation car in history by Autocar magazine.

== History ==
Rover's Land Rover Series I launched in 1948 had been designed to be cheap, simple to manufacture, and suitable for hard work in rural terrain, with minimal concessions toward comfort. Rover shortly realised that a market existed for an off-road capable vehicle with more amenities. In 1949, the Land Rover estate car was released, with a coach-built wood-framed body by Tickford. However, the high price of adding such car-like features as seven seats, floor carpets, a heater, a one-piece windscreen resulted in fewer than 700 being sold before the model was dropped in 1951.

In 1954, Land Rover launched a second iteration estate car, this time aimed at the commercial user who needed an off-road vehicle for carrying passengers without car-like comforts. Based on the commercial variant of the Land Rover, it had seats fitted to the load space and windows cut into the sides. While available with features such as an interior light, heater, door and floor trims and upgraded seats, the estate car retained the base vehicle's tough and capable suspension – as well as its mediocre road performance.

By the late 1950s, Rover had become convinced a market for a more comfortable 4x4 existed in areas such as Africa and Australia, where ordinary motorists faced long journeys on unmade roads that called for four-wheel drive and tough suspension. In 1958 the first of the "Road Rover" development cars was built. Combining the Land Rover's tenacity with the comfort of a Rover saloon car, it featured a Land Rover chassis and running gear clothed in a functional estate car-like body. It never made it into production.

By the 1960s, Rover was becoming aware of the embryonic development of the sport utility vehicle in North America. Proto SUVs such as the Willys Jeep Station Wagon (1949 for the Utility Wagon version with 4wd), International Scout (1961), Jeep Wagoneer (1962) and the Ford Bronco (1966) began the skew of 4x4s towards speed and comfort while retaining more than adequate off-road ability for most private users. To provide Rover a nudge to step up, the president of the company's USA operations shipped a Land Rover Series II 88 to Britain fitted with an advanced small block all-aluminium Buick V8 engine.

Rover acknowledged the emerging recreational off-road market in 1967 under Charles Spencer King, and began the "100-inch Station Wagon" programme to develop a radical competitor. Rover bought a Bronco, which featured the sort of long-travel coil spring suspension necessary for the required blend of luxury car comfort and Land Rover's proven off-road ability. King is said to have been convinced of coil springs while driving a Rover P6 across rough scrubland on part of the Solihull factory site that was being redeveloped. He was also convinced that a permanent four-wheel drive transmission was needed both to provide adequate handling and reliably absorb the power required for the vehicle to be competitive. The cost of developing a totally new transmission was spread between the 100-inch SW project and one working on what would become the Land Rover 101 Forward Control. Powerful, light and sturdy, the Buick alloy V8 earned off-road modifications such as carburettors that maintained fuel supply at extreme angles and provision for cranking the engine with a starting handle in emergencies.

The final bodywork featured a design largely done by the engineering team, rather than David Bache's styling division.

== On and off-road concept ==
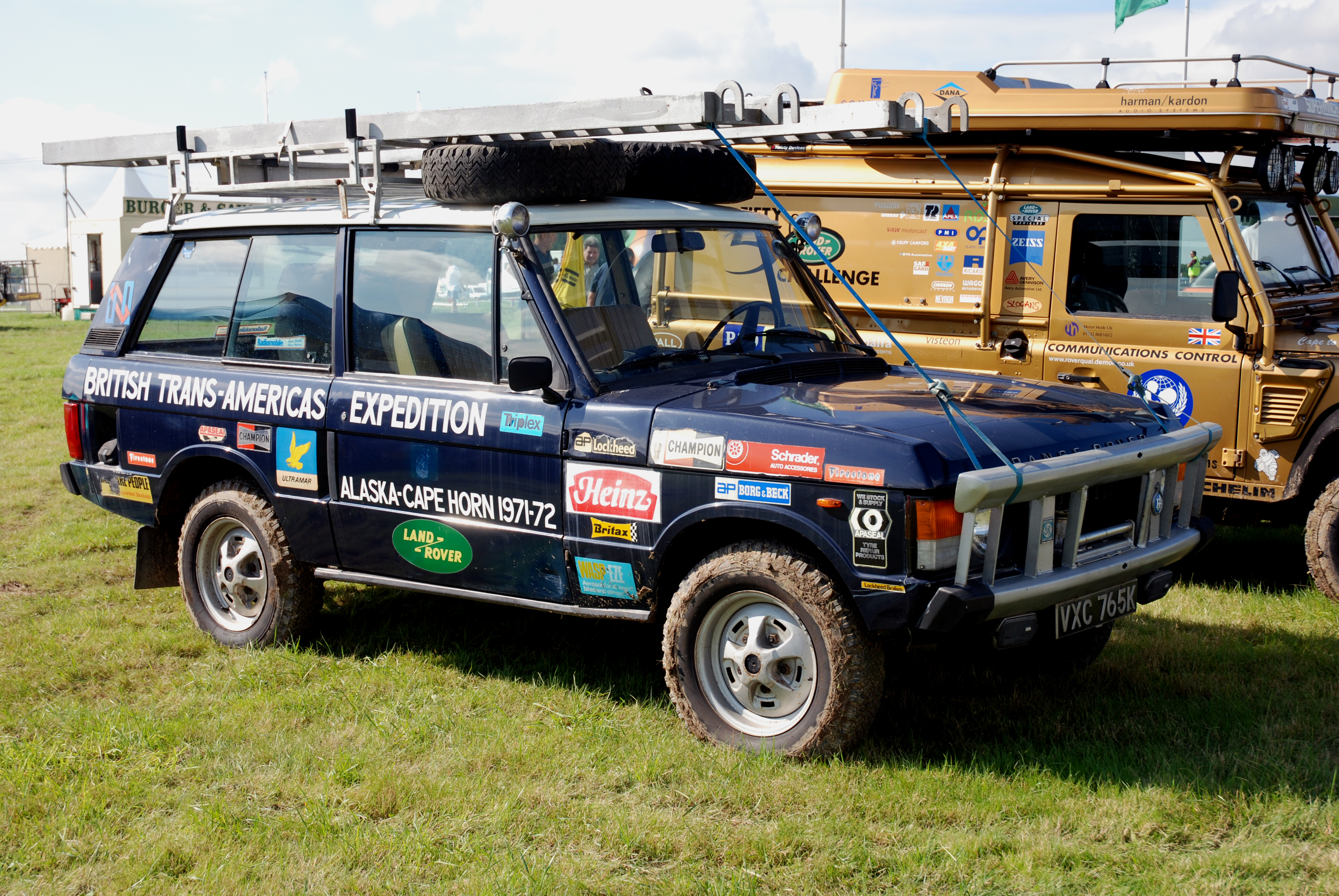
1971 Range Rover that was used in the three-month, 18,000-mile Trans-American Expedition—a standard production vehicle fitted with only a few speciality off-road items.

Introduced to the public in June 1970, the new "Range Rover" was launched as "A Car For All Reasons", boasting a top speed of around 100 mph (160 km/h), a towing capacity of 3.5 tons, spacious accommodation for five occupants, hydraulic disc brakes on all wheels, and a groundbreaking four-speed, dual-range, permanent four-wheel drive system.

To much critical acclaim, it appeared that Rover had succeeded in their goal of making a car equally capable both on and off-road. With a top speed of 95 mph (153 km/h) and acceleration from a standstill to 60 mph (97 km/h) in less than 15 seconds, performance was stated as being better than many family saloon cars of its era, and off-road performance was good, owing to its long suspension travel and high ground clearance. The 1995 Classic Range Rovers would reduce the 0 to 60 mph (0 to 97 km/h) time to around 11 seconds, and increase the top speed to approximately 110 mph (180 km/h).

Notable off-road feats were winning the four-wheel drive class in the first Paris-Dakar Rally in 1979 and 1981, and being two of the first vehicles (along with a Land Rover Series IIA) to traverse both American continents north-to-south through the Darién Gap from 1971 to 1972.

Even though the concept was initially aimed at customers like construction foremen and military officers who needed 4WD for professional reasons as well as occasional recreational users like skiers, it soon became a car of choice for aristocratic English country house owners.

== Body ==
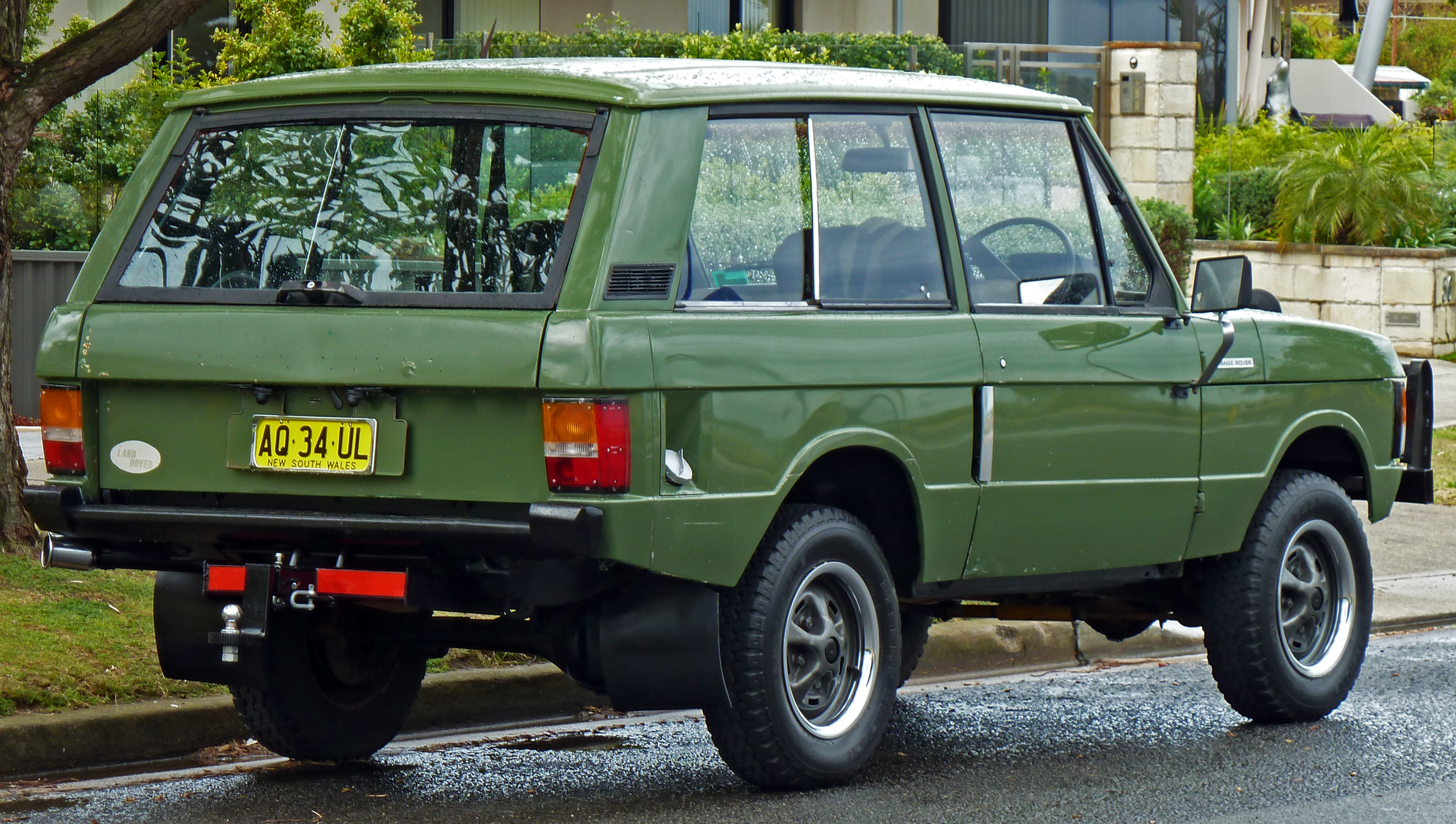
Range Rover three-door

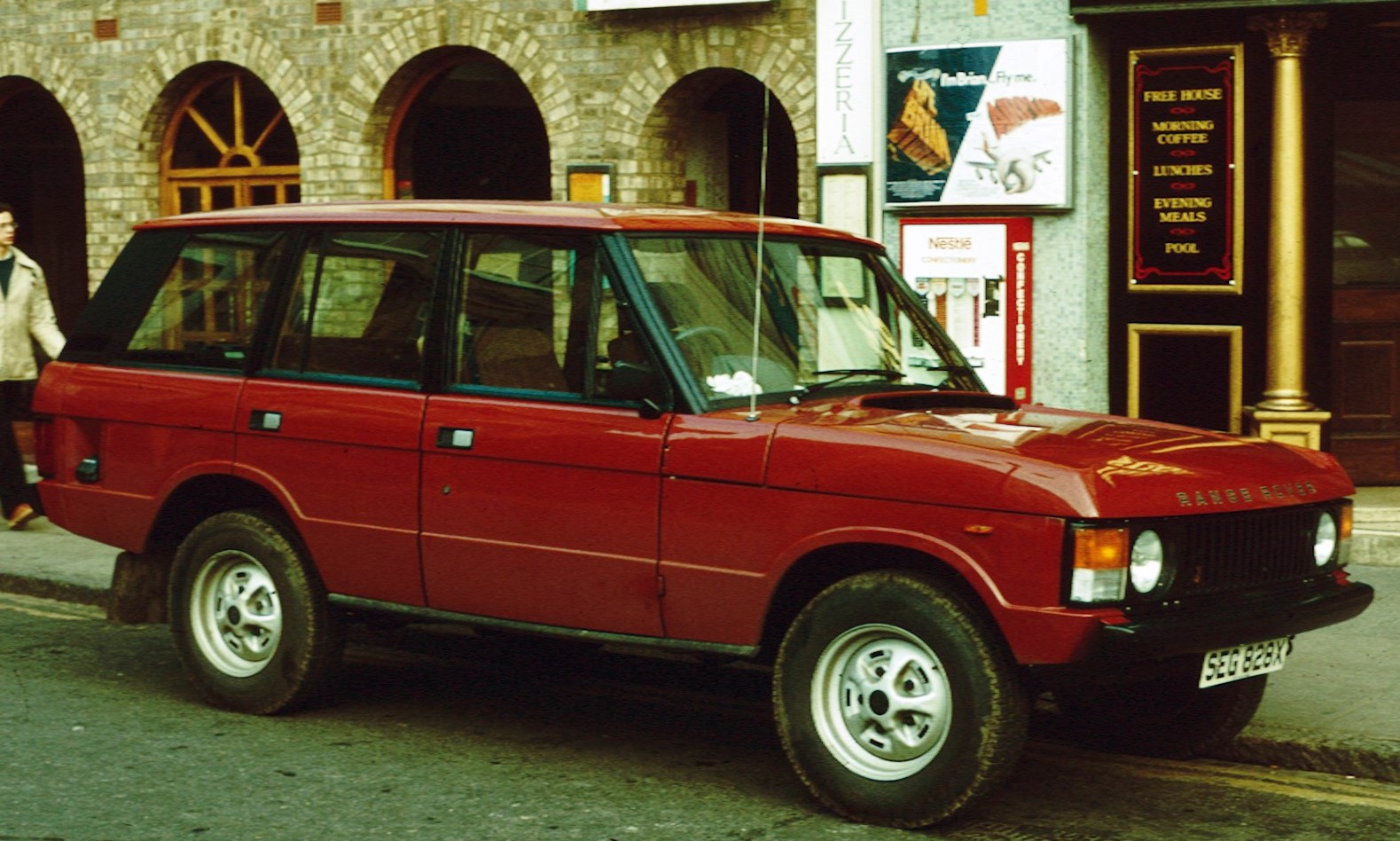
Early Range Rover five-door

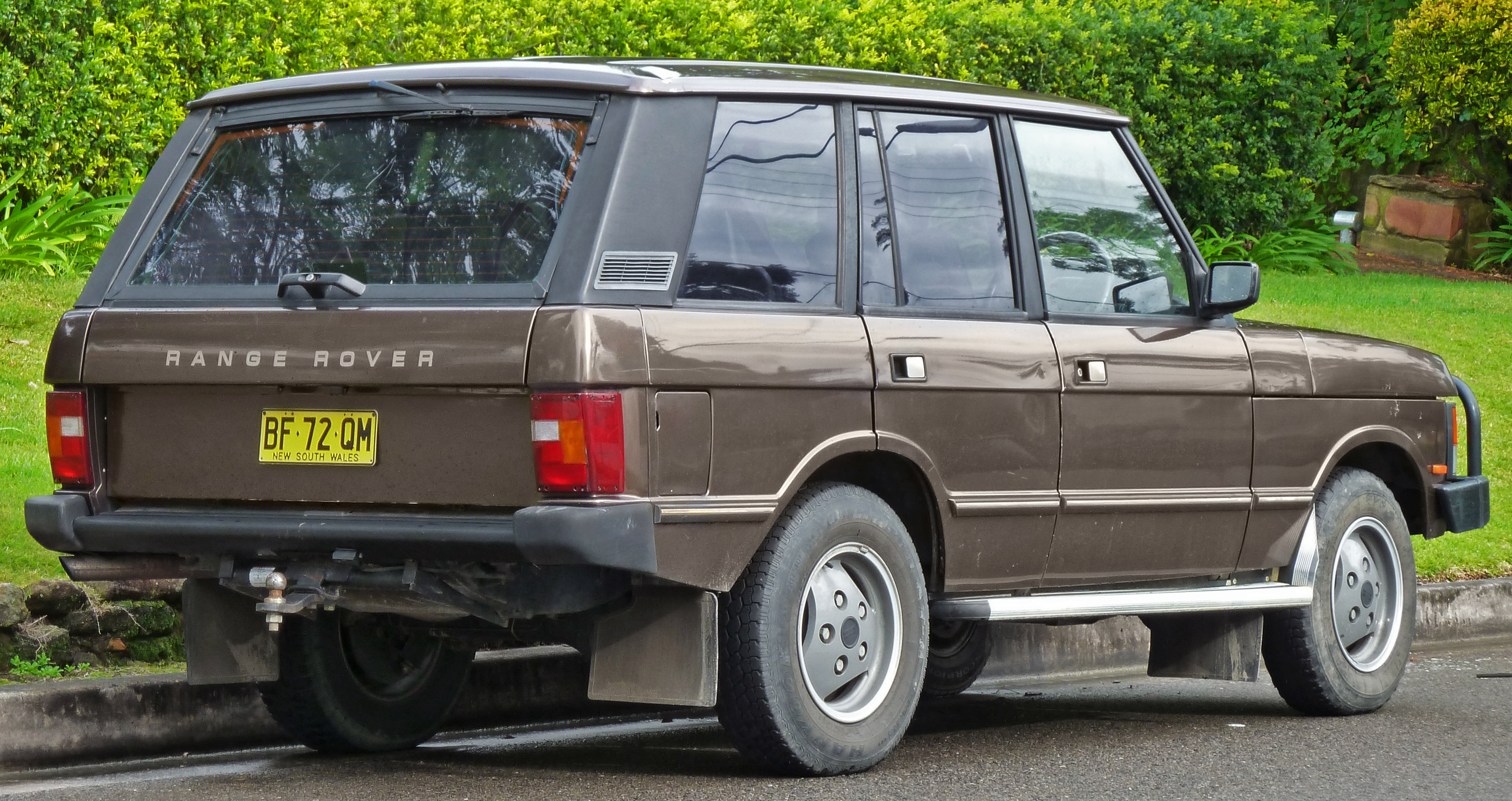
Later Range Rover five-door

Like other Land Rover vehicles, most of the Range Rover's bodywork skin is constructed from lightweight aluminium, except for the two-section rear upper and lower tailgates, the rear corners adjacent to the tailgate and the bonnet on all but the earliest models. Apart from minor cosmetic changes, the body design changed very little in its first decade. However, while utility Land Rovers had body panels rolled from a single sheet of aluminium, the Range Rover used aluminium panels hung on a steel 'safety frame' (a method pioneered with great success on the Rover P6 saloon). This allowed the bodywork of the Range Rover to carry much greater structural strength with the steel frame while retaining the corrosion-resistant and easily repaired aluminium outer panels. While the steel frame was designed by the engineering team, it was expected that Rover's stylist David Bache would provide a design for the outer panels for use on the production vehicles. For the prototypes the engineers designed their own functional body panels simply to protect the occupants and to allow the vehicles to be driven legally on the road. However the clean, square-cut and functional design of the prototype was deemed so good that Bache only altered the detailing, such as providing a different front grille and headlamp design. The Range Rover also marked the first appearance of Bache's trademark "symmetric" dashboard, where a common moulding was used for the fascia superstructure on both RHD and LHD versions, onto which the pod-style instrument binnacle was simply mounted on the appropriate side – Bache would use this concept again on both the Rover SD1 and the Austin Metro in later years. The original fascia would later be nicknamed the "Airfix Dashboard" by Range Rover enthusiasts owing to its hard, low quality plastics which, as the vehicle moved upmarket over the years, betrayed its humble beginnings as a utility vehicle, It remained with the Range Rover up until the very last years of production when it was replaced by the "soft dash" (see below)

Early vehicles may be distinguished by the rear 'C' pillars being absent of a vinyl covering which was introduced a little later in the 1970s.

One of the first significant changes came in 1981, with the introduction of a four-door body. Until then, Range Rovers only had two doors for the sake of body strength, making access to the rear seats – especially ingress – rather awkward. These doors were also very large and heavy. Egress was somewhat alleviated by the special design feature of having two inside door-opening latches: latches in the front of the doors for the driver and front passenger, and a second set of equally large and prominently styled door-opener latches on the inside rear of the doors (behind the front seats), providing rear seat occupants full autonomy to leave the vehicle. They could easily fold the seats in front of them forward, and open the door from their rear seat locations in a somewhat convenient manner.

Several companies offered conversions to four-door Range Rovers in the late 1970s. One of these companies' conversions, by Monteverdi, was even approved by Land Rover to retain warranty after it was presented at the 1980 Geneva Salon. Two years earlier, British Leyland had restructured and promoted Land Rover into its own BL subsidiary and the now more independent company used the Monteverdi as a basis for producing its own four-door model in July 1981. The four-door version was well received by the public — its popularity was such that the two-door was discontinued in the United Kingdom in 1984, although the two-door continued to be produced through January 1994, mainly for the French market.

The first major push upmarket was in 1984, which saw the availability of leather trim, unhinged rear number plate and a new 4-speed ZF automatic transmission; this was followed by the 1985 model year, which saw the instrument pod replaced by a more modern one (adapted from the Austin Maestro) and new door cards (using Austin Metro door handles) with walnut inlays.

The front end of the Range Rover was revamped in 1986. This brought a more pedestrian-friendly plastic grille with horizontal slats, and optional front valance with two fog lights. The seat base was lowered and door handles were redesigned, making it more difficult for rear passengers but greatly improving the comfort for taller people in the front. The dashboard switchgear was updated again, now featuring steering column stalks from the Austin Montego, and other miscellaneous items from the Austin Rover car range. Other changes included the windows, tailgate and bonnet, but none of those affected the general design. Bonnet and door hinges gradually evolved out of sight and the fuel filler cap was hidden behind a hinged flap. The last major change to the interior took place in 1994, when the Range Rover was re-designated "Classic" upon the arrival of the replacement P38A version. The car gained a 'soft feel' safety dashboard (derived from that used in the facelifted Series 1 Discovery) with new switches (these were lifted from the Rover 800) and instruments. These end of the line models are popularly called "soft dash" models by the motor trade and by enthusiasts to distinguish them from other members of the Range Rover Classic series.

== Chassis and suspension ==
The Range Rover broke from the Land Rovers of its time by using coil springs instead of the then-common leaf springs. Because of its hefty weight, it also had disc brakes on all four wheels. Originally, it had no power steering, though this was added in 1973.

One problem with the Range Rover chassis was that it suffered considerably from body roll. Because of this, the suspension was lowered by 20 mm (0.8 in) in 1980, and later gained anti-roll bars. Air suspension was introduced in late 1992 for high-end 1993 models.

Most Range Rovers had a 100-inch (2,540 mm) wheelbase. However, 1992 saw the introduction of a more luxurious model, branded the LSE in the United Kingdom and County LWB (long wheelbase) in the United States, providing expansive rear-passenger legroom absent from the 100-inch wheelbase models. These had a 108-inch (2,743 mm) wheelbase, air suspension and 4.2-litre engines.

The 100-inch Range Rover chassis became the basis for the Land Rover Discovery, introduced in 1989.

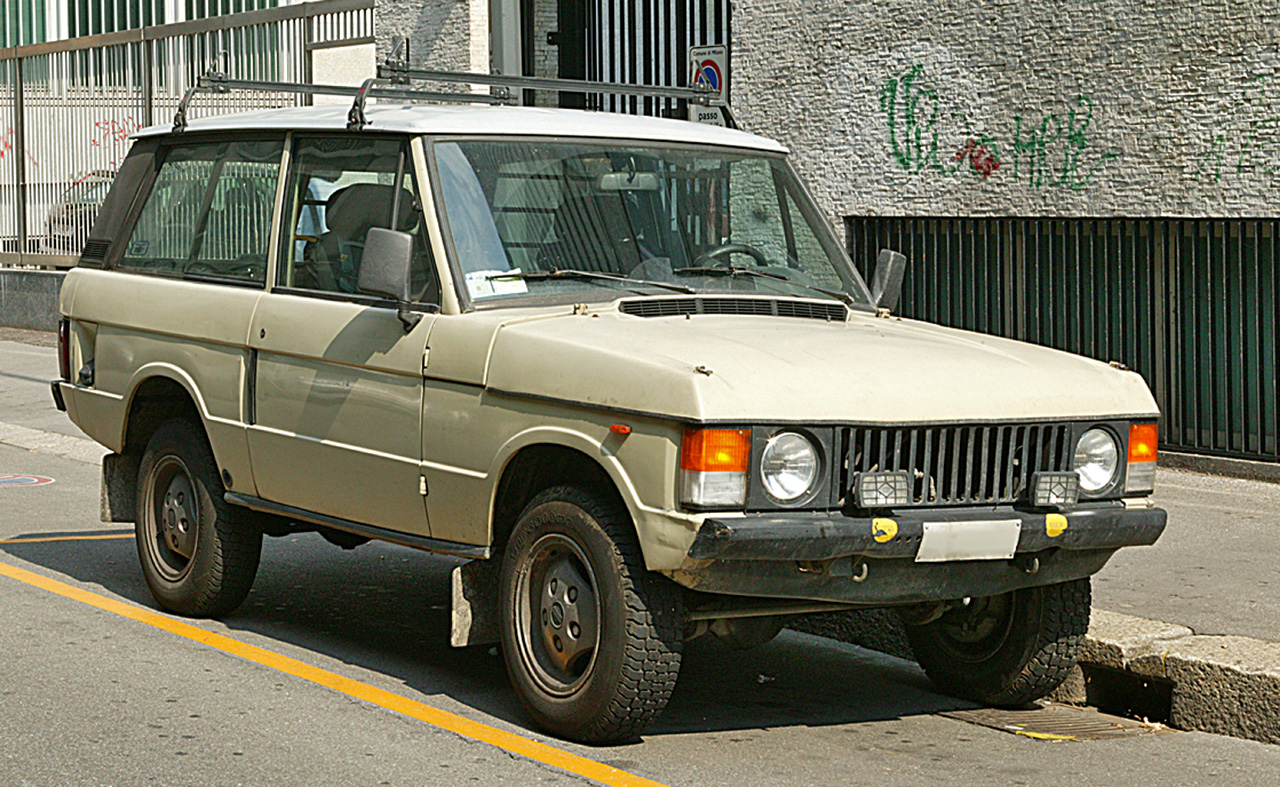
The first generation Range Rover, early two-door model fitted with the later model alloy wheels.

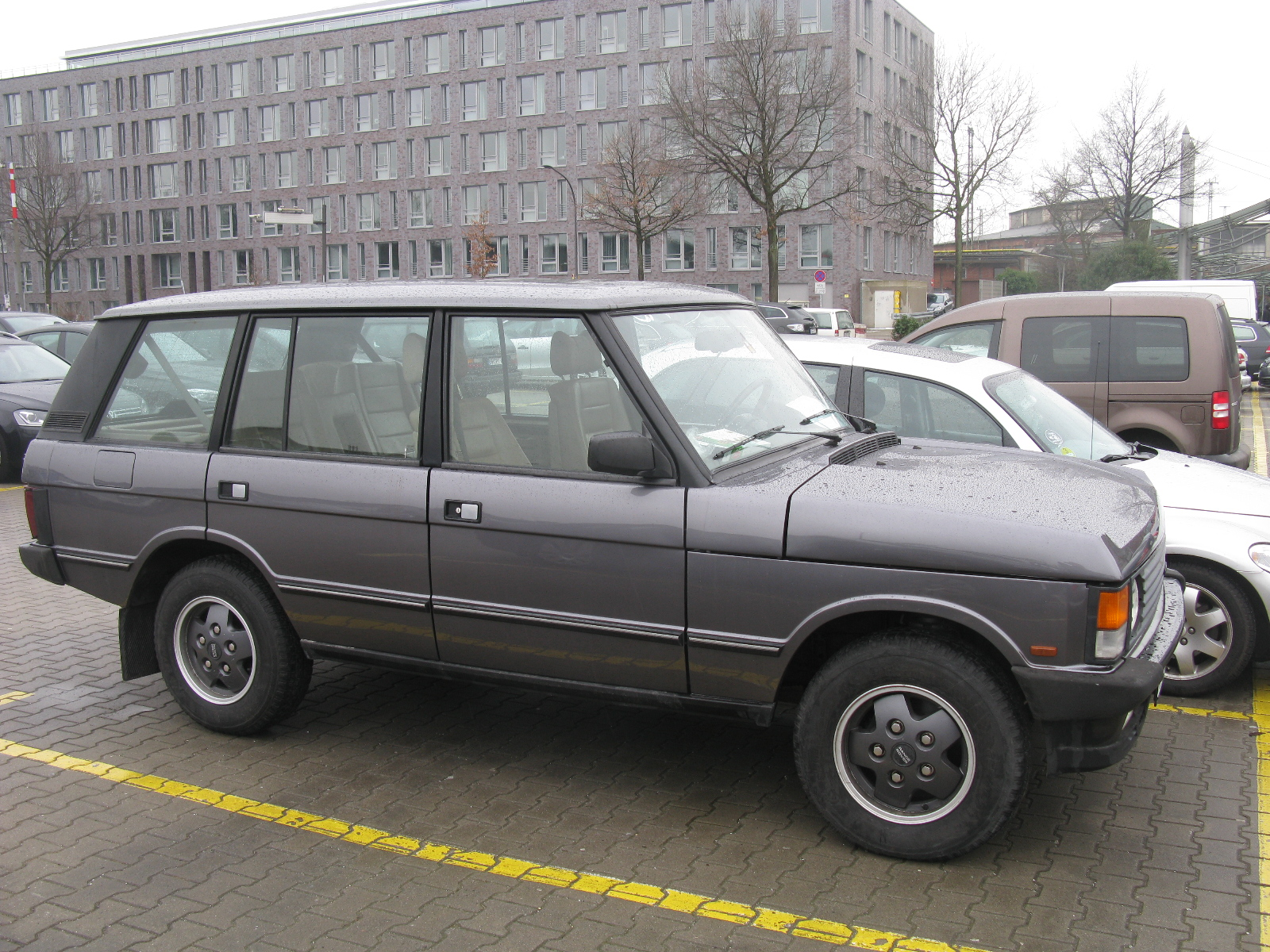
The post-facelift Range Rover was available with an 8-inch longer wheel-base as the LSE version, such as in this early 1990s example.

== Engines ==
Originally, the Range Rover was fitted with a detuned 135 hp (101 kW) version of the Buick-derived Rover V8 engine. The 3,528 cc (3.5 L; 215.3 cu in) engine was increased to a displacement of 3,947 cc (3.9 L; 240.9 cu in) for the 1989 model year, and 4,197 cc (4.2 L; 256.1 cu in) in 1992.

Petrol-fuelled Range Rovers were fitted with carburettors until 1986, when they were replaced by Lucas electronic fuel injection, improving both performance and fuel economy. The Lucas injection system continued to evolve over the next several years, culminating in the 1990 to 1995 Lucas 14CUX. Some export markets retained carburettors, with the original Zenith/Stromberg manufactured units being replaced by Skinners Union (SU)-manufactured items.

From 1979 onwards, Land Rover collaborated with Perkins on Project Iceberg, an effort to develop a diesel version of the Range Rover's 3.5-litre V8 engine. Both naturally aspirated and turbocharged versions were built, but the all-alloy engine blocks failed under the much greater pressures involved in diesel operation. The project was, therefore, abandoned. The effort to strengthen the Rover V8 for diesel operation was not, however, completely wasted; the 4.2-litre petrol variant of the engine used crankshaft castings developed in the Iceberg project.

Because of the Iceberg failure, it was not until 1986 that Range Rovers gained diesel engines from the factory. The more efficient 2,393 cc (2.4 L; 146.0 cu in) inline-four VM Motori diesel from Italy was made available as an option for the heavily taxed European market as the 'Turbo D' model, and were increased to 2,499 cc (2.5 L; 152.5 cu in) in 1989. The VM engines were highly advanced and refined diesel engines for their time but were received poorly by the UK press due to their inconsistent torque delivery compared to the V8 models. To counter these criticisms Land Rover used a Turbo D Range Rover to set several speed and endurance records for diesel vehicles during 1987, including a continuous run over 24 hours at over 100 mph (160 km/h). The VM were replaced by Land Rover's own 200Tdi turbocharged diesel engine in 1992. and 300Tdi at the end of 1994.

== Transmission ==
The Range Rover used permanent four-wheel drive, rather than the switchable rear-wheel/four-wheel drive on Land Rover Series vehicles, and had a lever for switching ratios on the transfer box for off-road use. Originally, the only gearbox available was a four-speed manual unit, until Fairey overdrive became an option after 1977. A three-speed Chrysler TorqueFlite automatic gearbox became an option in October 1982, after years of demands from buyers. This was upgraded to a 4-speed ZF box in 1985, coupled to an LT230 transfer box.

The other major transmission upgrade in the Range Rover's lifetime was the switch from the LT95 combined four-speed manual gearbox and transfer box to the LT77 five-speed gearbox and separate LT230 transfer box in 1983. The LT230 was later used on both the Defender and Discovery models, but was replaced on the Range Rover by a Borg Warner chain-driven transfer box incorporating an automatic viscous coupling limited slip differential – earlier transmissions had a manual differential lock (operated by a vacuum servo on the LT95 and mechanically on the LT230). The LT77 had two major design changes: first an upgrade to larger bearings for the layshaft and new ratios around 1988, then a newly designed synchro hub for third and fourth gear and double synchros for first and second. This is also known as the suffix H gearbox or LT77s.

== Australian assembly ==
Leyland Australia began assembly of the Range Rover from CKD kits at its Enfield plant, in New South Wales, Australia in 1979. Government increases in the tariff on parts led to Australian assembly being discontinued in 1983.

== Venezuela assembly ==
The Tracto Agro Group, representatives of the Land Rover brand and the Mack truck brand in Venezuela, starting in 1973 and after making investments to prepare the Mack of Venezuela assembly plant, in the city of Las Tejerias, assembled with CKD kits, the Range Rover Classic between 1973 and 1981.

== North American market ==
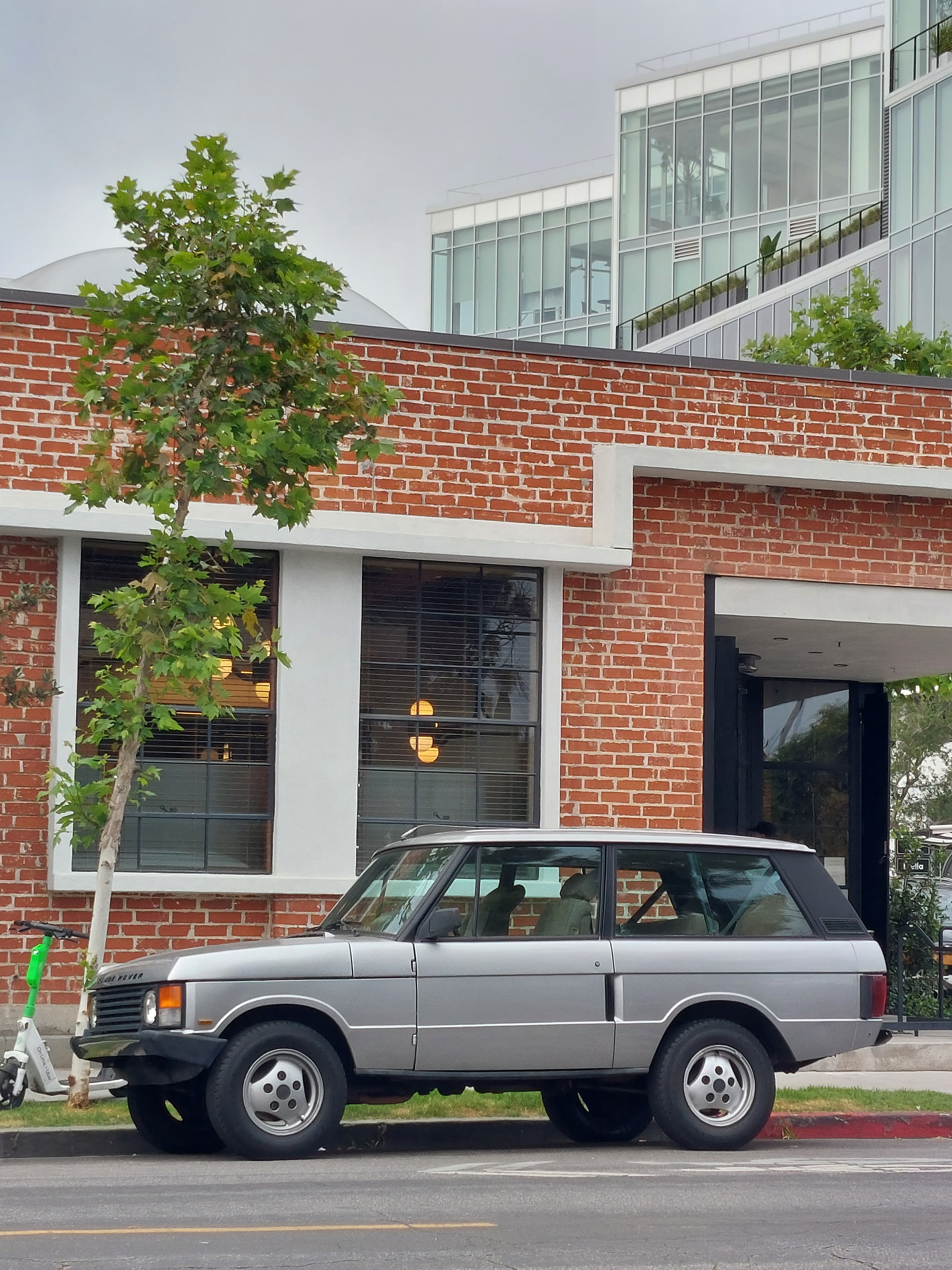
1983 Range Rover 2 door (Grey import vehicle) in Los Angeles, CA

Although the Range Rover was designed with the US market in mind, and was planned to be launched in the US in the middle of 1971, with a base price of $5,300, that did not actually happen, due to new US safety and environmental regulations, coupled with British Leyland's precarious finances. While the Land Rover Series III was still imported into the US, a decline in sales and new design regulations caused British Leyland to withdraw the Land Rover brand from the US market in 1974.

Americans did want the Range Rover, so in the early 1980s, Americans obtained the Range Rover through the rather costly grey market, modified to meet US regulations by four Los Angeles area-based dealers, and starting in 1984, also by Aston Martin's American Division based in Greenwich, Connecticut.

Import of factory built U.S. Model Range Rovers began 16 March 1987. Range Rover of North America was established in Lanham, Maryland in late 1985, to import through the ports of Baltimore and Long Beach, California. Only four door models were ever imported. With demand far exceeding supply, Range Rovers were often resold for far more than their retail price. Range Rover would be sold nationwide through a network of 36 dealers, expanding to 65 by 1988. With fuel injection replacing the carburetors, Range Rover was easier to modify for US emission regulations. The Range Rover was officially introduced to the US market in the 1987 LA Auto Show in January and Chicago Auto Show on 7 February.

In 1988, Range Rover won Playboy′s "Best 4x4" award. In 1989, to establish its reputation, eight special edition Range Rovers were prepared for the "Great Divide Expedition", a 12-day, 1128 mile trek in the Rocky Mountains in the state of Colorado, from 21 August to 2 September 1989. Partway through the event, one of these special edition Range Rovers was rolled multiple times at high speed by automotive journalist Jay Lamm.

On 1 August 1992, The Range Rover of North America label became Land Rover North America, Inc.

== Continued developments ==
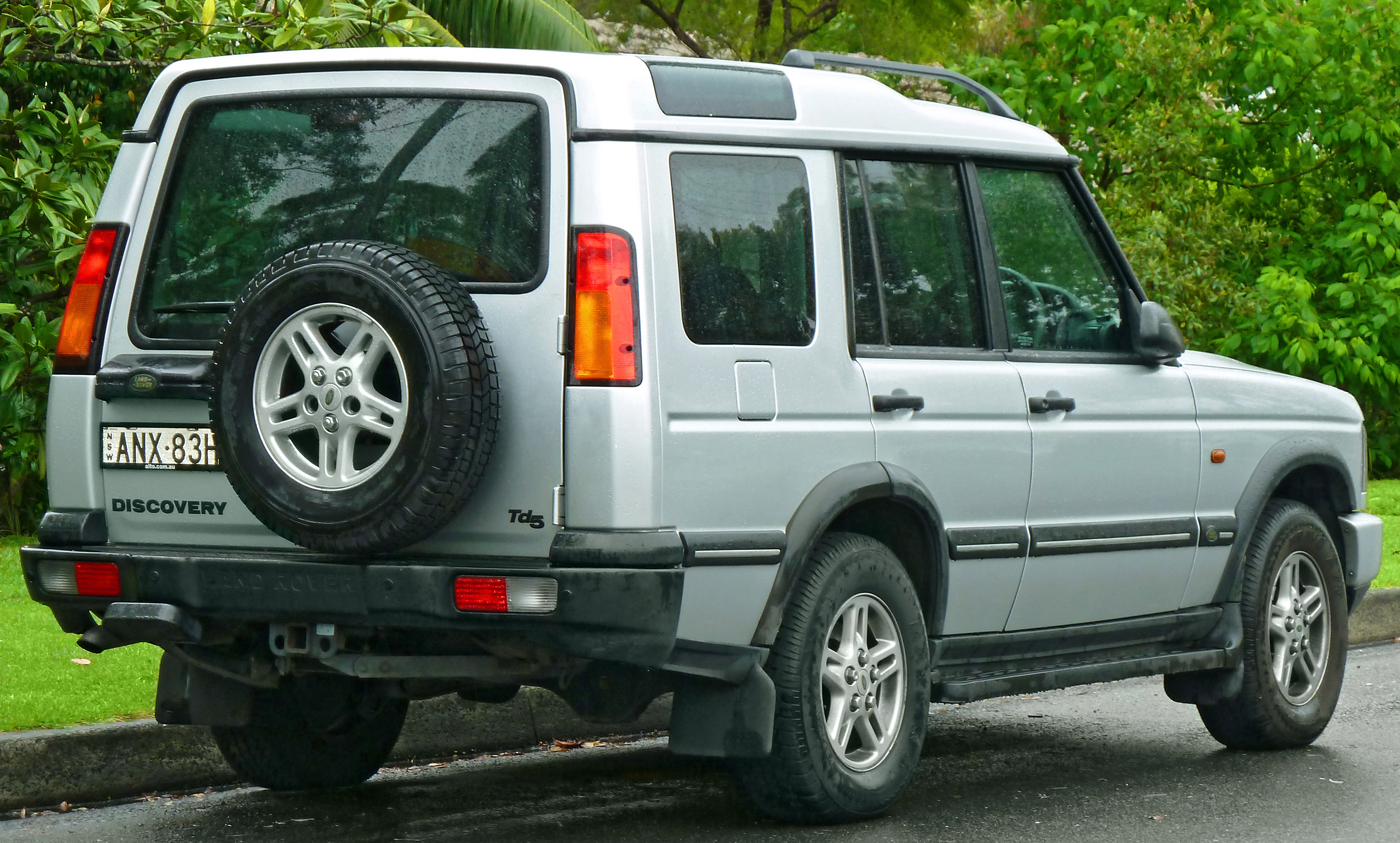
The Land Rover Discovery II carried the original Range Rover platform over through 2004.

Facing a limited budget, but a strong need to offer a model in between the ageing Defender 90 and Defender 110, and the ever more successfully upmarket selling Range Rover, the first generation of a new, less expensive, more family-friendly model was derived: the Discovery. A reclothed Range Rover in essence, riding on the same chassis and wheelbase, with a body using the same windscreen, A-pillar and front door windows, it used much of the Range Rover's inner structure. However, with various cost-reductions – notably a cheaper interior; a smaller, less powerful, base diesel engine; and only two side doors during its first year – the greatly similar vehicle was marketed at a distinctly lower price point, filling the gap in Land Rover's model range, starting in 1989.

In order to give the car at least a differing silhouette from the Range Rover, the Discovery got a stepped, raised rear roof, with a safari rear window cluster. To be able to fit optional third row jump seats, the rear of the car was actually made slightly longer than its more expensive stable mate. On top of that, the spare wheel was mounted on the outside of the vehicle — all three measures greatly increased the Discovery's luggage compartment space compared to the Range Rover. Its original 3.5 litre V8-engine was available as an option on the Discovery and, to compensate, the Range Rover's standard V8-engine was enlarged to 3.9 litres.

In 1992, to address customers request for more rear-seat legroom in the otherwise luxurious Range Rover, a 108-inch (2,743 mm) long wheelbase option was introduced; and in 1994, the 2nd generation Range Rover (LP) was introduced, using an evolution of the long wheelbase chassis and drivetrain. In 1994, the Classic model, which was to continue in production alongside its replacement for a time, was also given a revised version of the more modern dashboard from the Discovery Mk1, which was significantly better quality than the original and saved manufacturing the old dash for the runout model.

While the Range Rover finally received a clean-sheet redesign after 31 years, in 2001, the Discovery still kept using much of the original Range Rover's underpinnings after a successful 1998 facelift, which made it still longer and larger in the rear, and which kept it going through 2004.

== Specific conversions ==
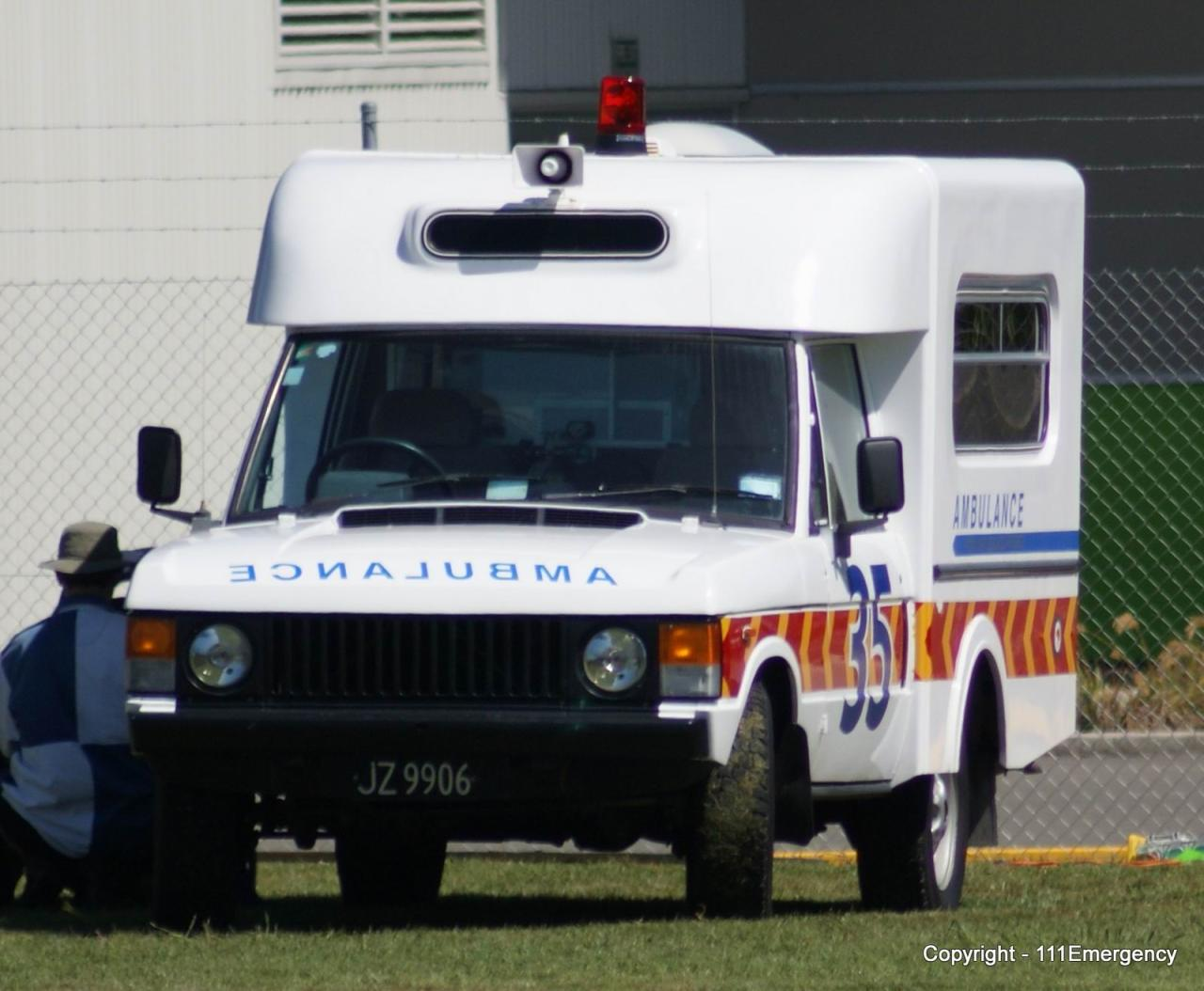
An ambulance of the Royal New Zealand Air Force built by Wadham Stringer

The Range Rover Classic was a popular platform for conversion vehicles built by independent coachbuilders. Some examples of common modifications include ambulances, 6x4s, convertibles, police vehicles, limos, and open top hunting cars. Though some coachbuilders utilised Range Rovers simply for the chassis and drivetrain while grafting new fabricated bodies on top, most of them retained the familiar Range Rover styling elements, while upgrading the engine, transmission, suspension, or interior design. The coachbuilders include Carbodies, Carmichael, FLM Panelcraft, Glenfrome, Rapport and Wood and Pickett.

=== Popemobile ===
Two of Pope John Paul II's three popemobiles used on his 1982 UK visit were custom Range Rovers. Ogle Design penned the vehicles, the first fully bulletproof Papal transports, and they were delivered at a cost of £128,000 (equivalent to £460,000 in 2025). One of the two Range Rovers was taken back to the Vatican, and is still in use as of 2013. The other is now on display at the Cars of the Stars Museum in Las Vegas.

=== Police, fire and ambulance service ===
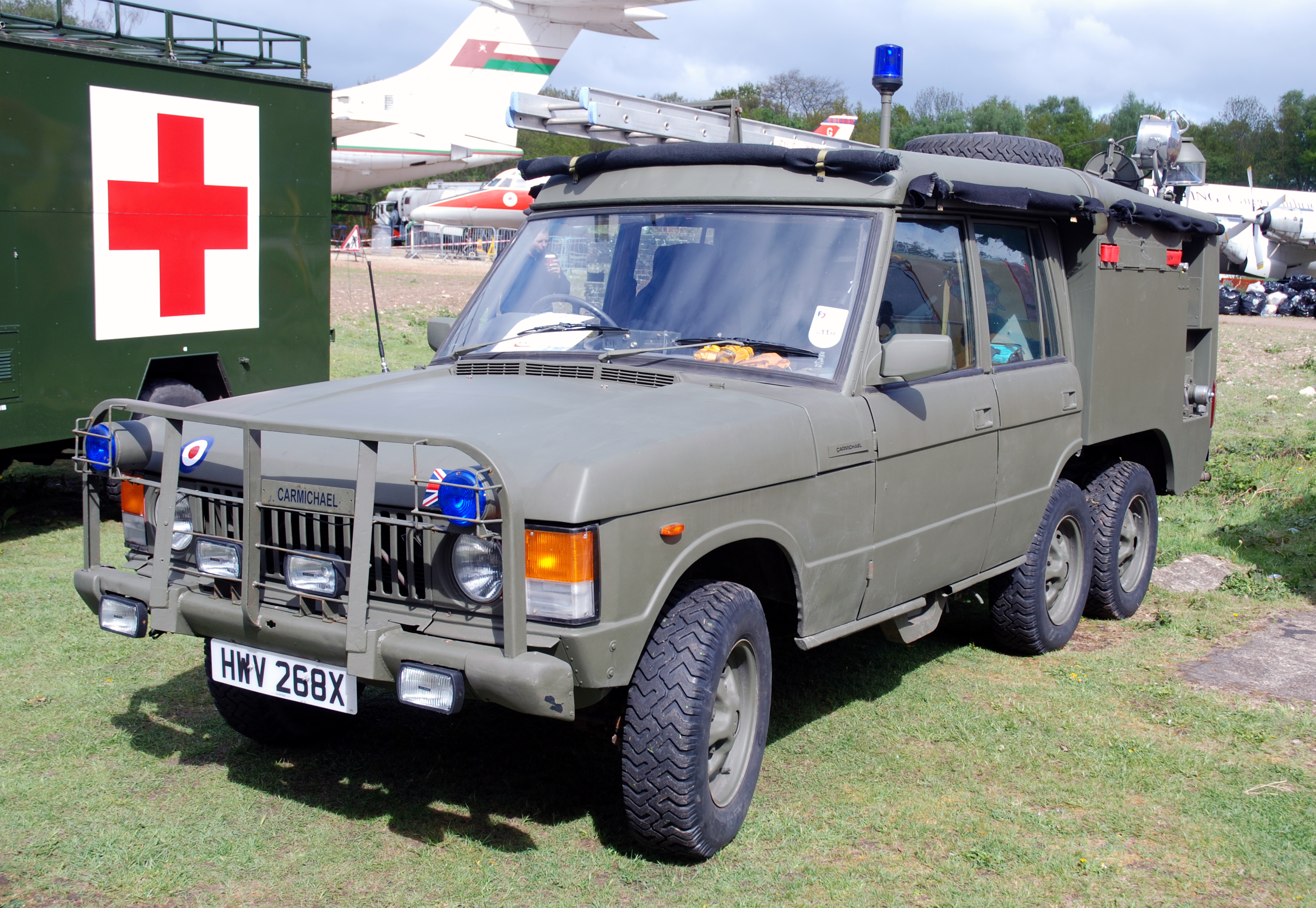
RAF TACR2

Coachbuilders and fabricators such as Carmichael, Gloster Saro, and HBC Angus modified numerous Range Rover vehicles for first response use.

British and foreign constabularies utilised the Range Rover in both two and four door forms. From the 1971 to 1993, Land Rover Special vehicles-along with private builders-outfitted vehicles for police use.

The TACR2 was a six-wheeled Range Rover-based successor to the TACR1. Its designation stands for Truck Fire-Fighting Airfield Crash Rescue 2 Tonne 6x4 Mark 2. It was designed as a rapid response vehicle used by the Royal Air Force, Royal Navy, and various British fire brigades. It was built by Carmichael, Gloster Saro and HCB Angus. It is permanent four wheel drive and the trailing axle was originally unpowered. Some TACR2s have been converted to six wheel drive. After their service life ended, some were transferred to regional or airport fire service.

The Range Rover was a favoured platform for ambulances across the British Isles, with builders Carmichael, Herbert Lomas, Pilcher Greene, Wadham Stringer, Spencer Abbot, and Heinel Specialbilar supplying modifications.

== See also ==
- Monteverdi Safari
