= Gordon Bashford =

British automobile designer

- Born: 27 August 1916
- Died: 21 September 1991 (aged 75)
- Known for: Car design engineer

Gordon Dennis Bashford (27 August 1916 – 21 September 1991) was a British car design engineer. Bashford played a significant part in the design of most post-war Rover cars, including the Land Rover.

== Career ==
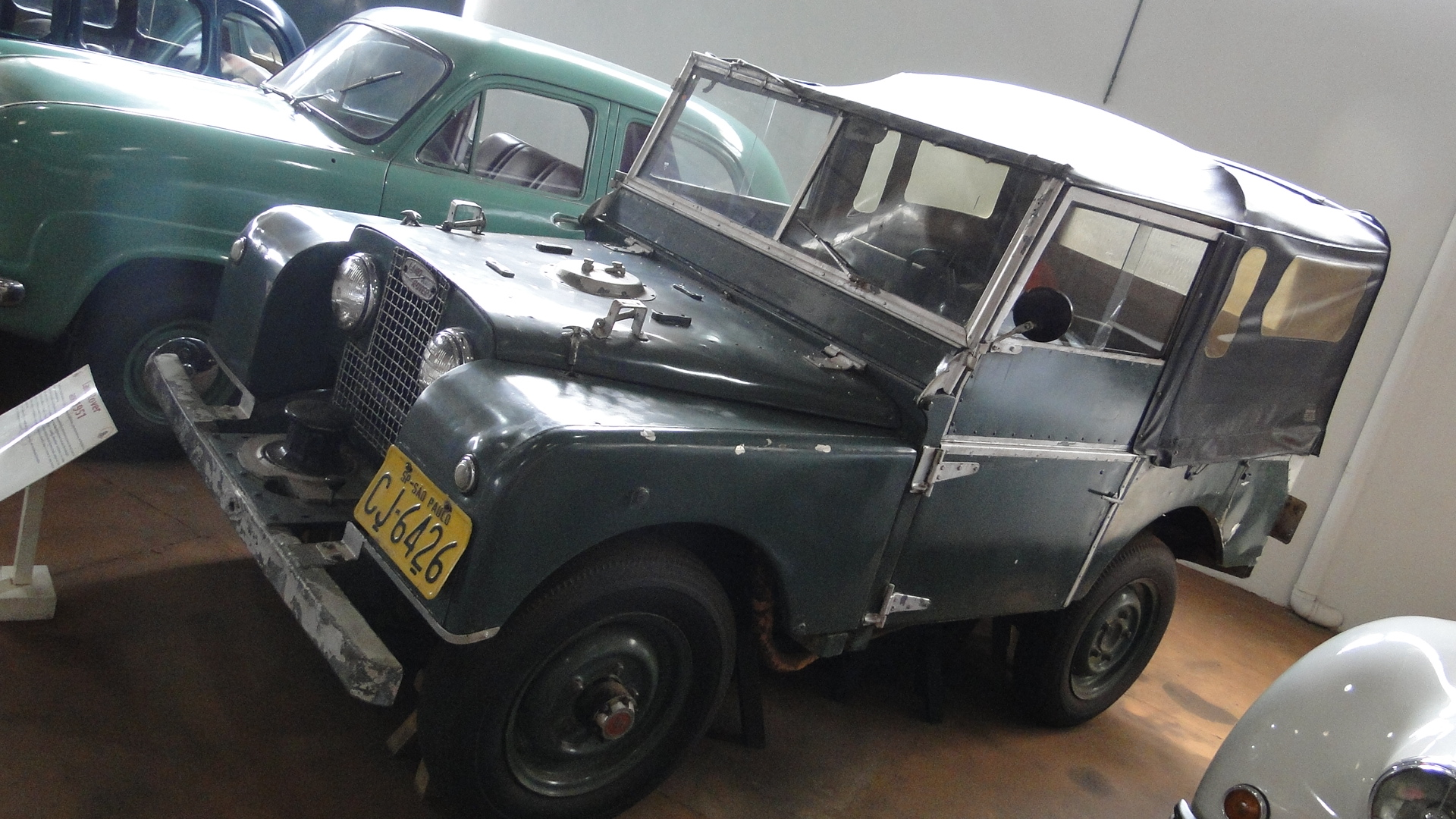
Early Land Rover

Bashford joined the Rover Company at the age of 14 as an apprentice in 1930. He went on to be instrumental in the design of Rover's revolutionary Land Rover off-road vehicle which was launched at the Amsterdam Motor Show in 1948.

After the Land Rover, Bashford was involved in the development of a series of David Bache styled Rover cars, including the P4, as chief designer of chassis and body for the P6 and as designer of the SD1 which won European Car of the Year in 1977.

Bashford also played a key role, along with Spen King, in the development of the 1970 Range Rover.

Bashford retired in 1981.
