= David Bache =

English automobile designer (1925–1994)

- Born: 14 June 1925; Mannheim, Germany
- Died: 26 November 1994 (aged 69)
- Known for: Automobile design

David Ernest Bache (14 June 1925 – 26 November 1994) was a German-born English automobile designer. For much of his career he worked with Rover.

== Early life ==
Bache was born in Mannheim, Germany, the son of Aston Villa and England footballer Joe Bache who was coaching in Mannheim following his retirement. Towards the end of World War II David joined the Austin Motor Company as an engineering apprentice. When he had finished his apprenticeship he moved to Austin's design office.

== Career ==
=== Austin ===
In the Austin design office Bache worked under Dick Burzi, recruited from Lancia by Austin in 1929. One of his first jobs was to design the dashboard of the Austin A30.

=== Rover ===
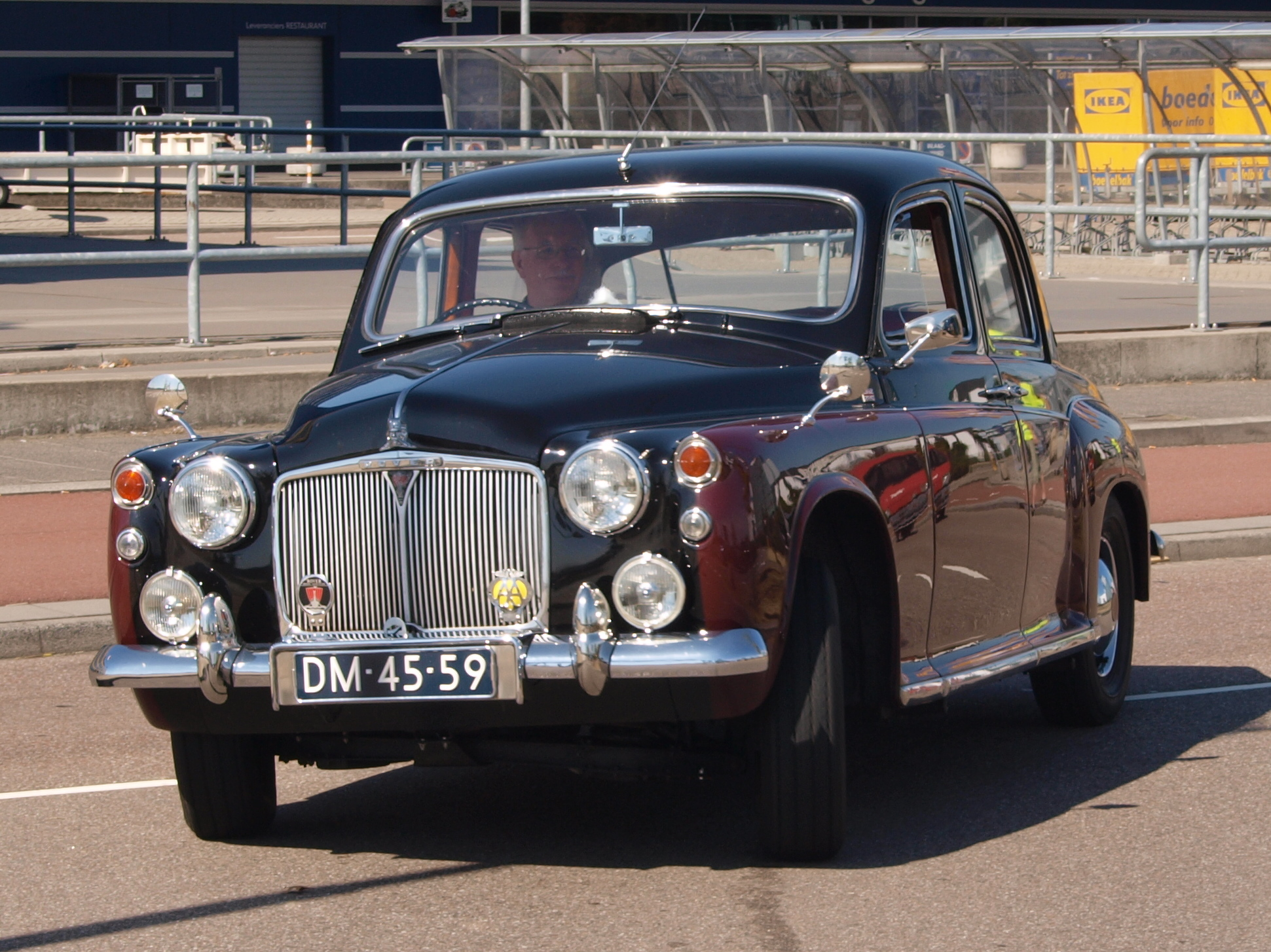
new front

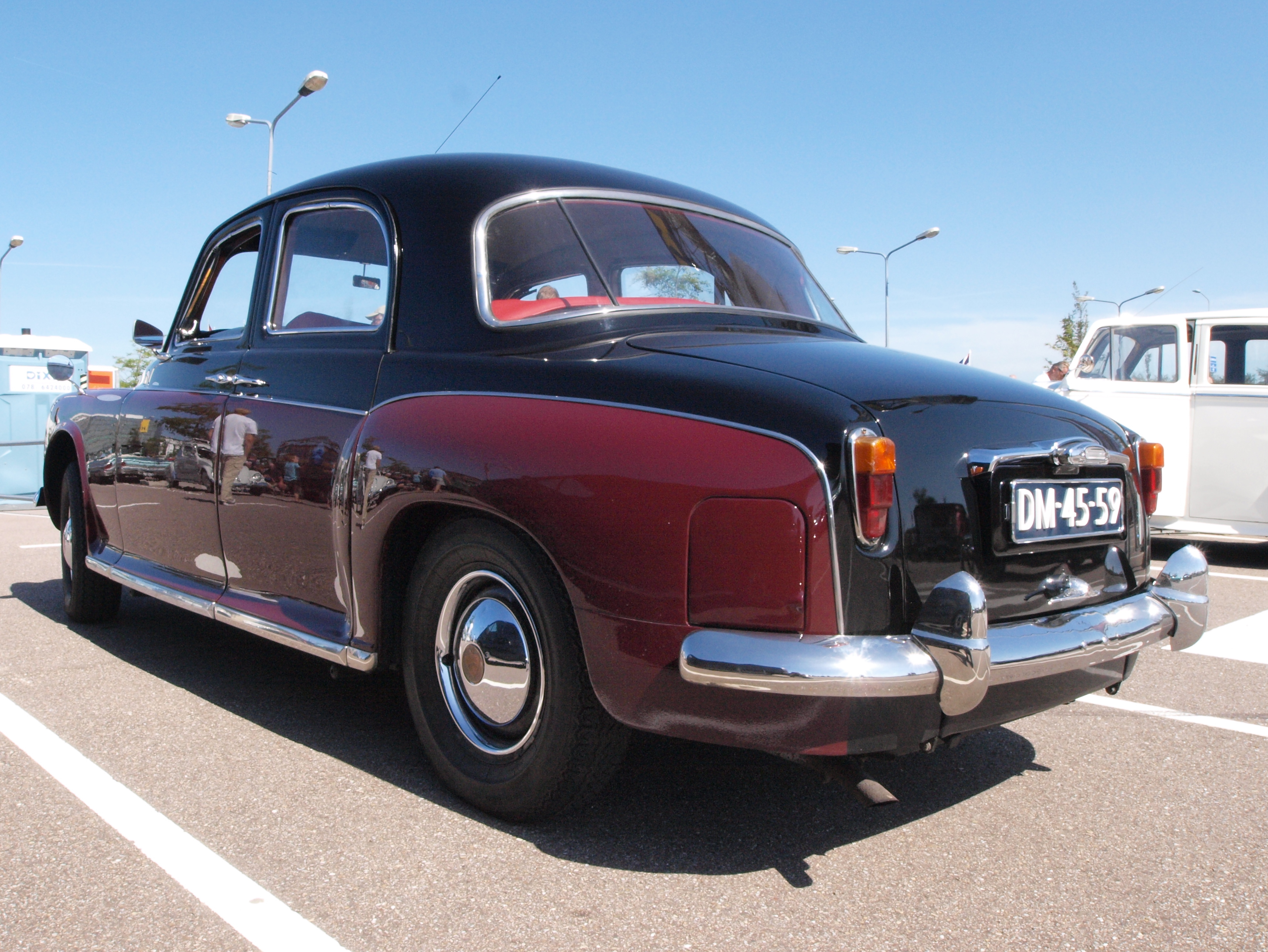
Rover 75 new back

In 1954 Bache moved to Rover in Solihull, becoming Rover's first ever stylist; the term 'stylist' was used at the time to differentiate the role from that of design engineer. His first task was to update the Rover 60, 75 and 90 models. He raised the boot height and enlarged the rear window. A year later he modified the frontal treatment, strengthening the detail and the new David Bache styled cars lasted ten more years with a very minor alteration to the grille inset.

He was also responsible for giving the Land Rover Series II a more domesticated appearance than its more agricultural predecessor. The revised shape, completed in just six weeks lived on, little changed, until Land Rover Defender production ceased in early 2017.

==== Rover 3-litre ====
The shape of cars was changing dramatically during the 1950s as soft rounded curves gave way to straight lines and sharp corners. Improvements in construction enabled engineers to dispense with a separate chassis, allowing passengers to sit lower in the vehicle. The development of curved glass also gave stylists new opportunities. A visit to the 1955 Paris Auto Show would have a profound effect on Bache's style vocabulary. He was very taken with the revolutionary new Citroen DS, as well as the imposing Facel Vega. Other influences were the Italian coach-builder Ghia's designs for Chrysler, and work of Pininfarina, who had been commissioned to produce a coupé and convertible on the Rover P4 chassis prior to Bache's arrival.

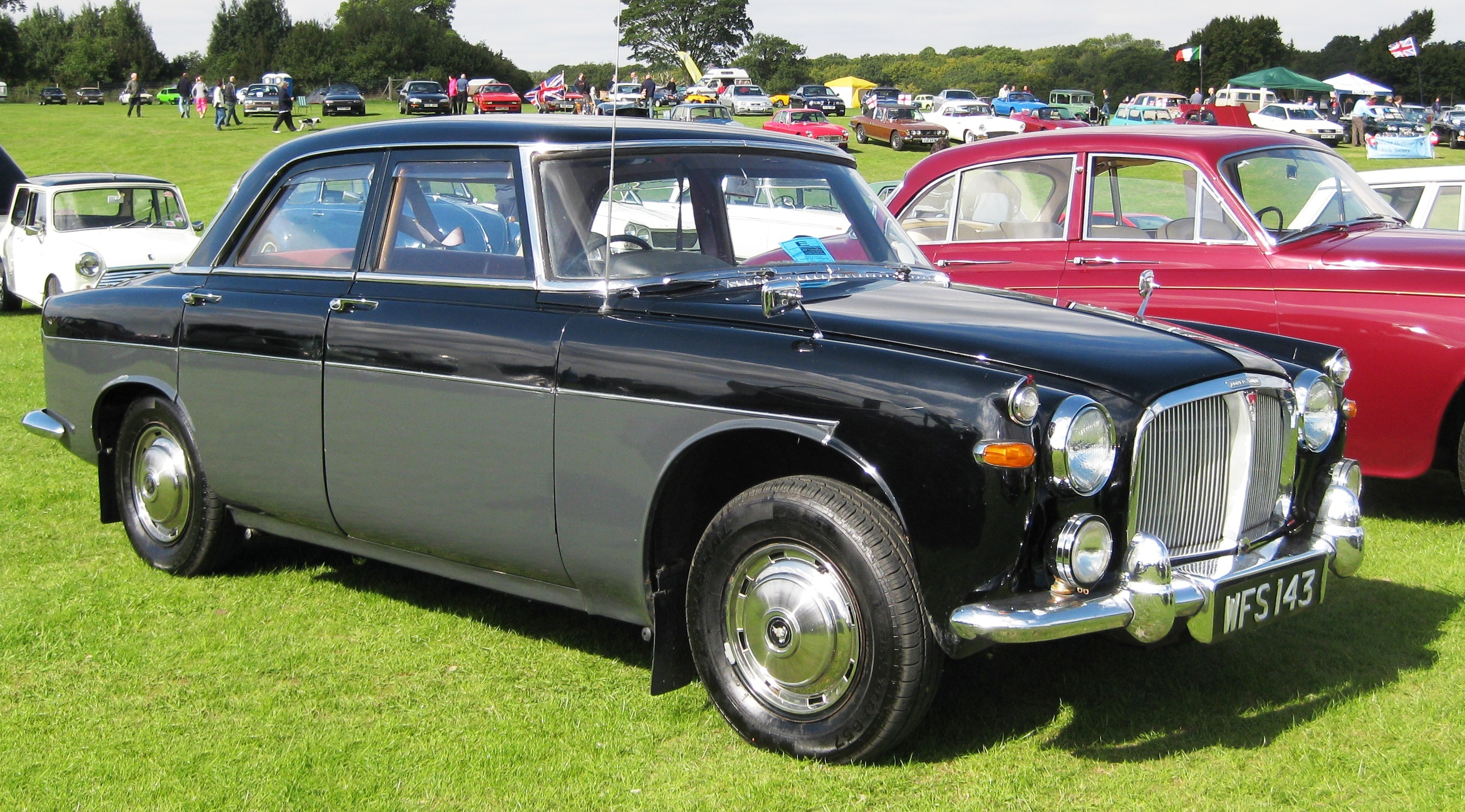
Rover P5 3-litre

Bache created the shape for the P5, then expected to be a smaller, higher volume model of a similar size to the current Ford Zephyr. Bache's first attempts were distinctly modern and anticipated generous use of chrome fittings. It did not please Rover Managing Director Maurice Wilks who, before Bache's arrival had closely overseen all styling. "It's a head turner", Wilks explained, "The Rover Company don't make head-turners. We like to make vehicles which pass unobtrusively and are not noticed." Bache went back to the drawing board and came up with something more like an evolution of the P4. But after a full-size mock-up for the P5 was completed, Wilks changed direction. The success of the Land Rover, originally intended as a stop-gap model to help Rover's exports after the war, meant all available space in the Solihull factory was being taken up with meeting this demand. There simply was no room for a new high-volume model. The decision was taken in 1956 to make the P5 a larger lower-volume car. Bache's started again, and produced an imposing unfussy design. The straight line running from the top of the front wing to the rear and slab sides are reminiscent of the Facel Vega, as was the wrap-around front windscreen. It is a tribute to Bache's vision that while the P4 went through at least three facelifts, the shape of the P5 remained unchanged for fifteen years.

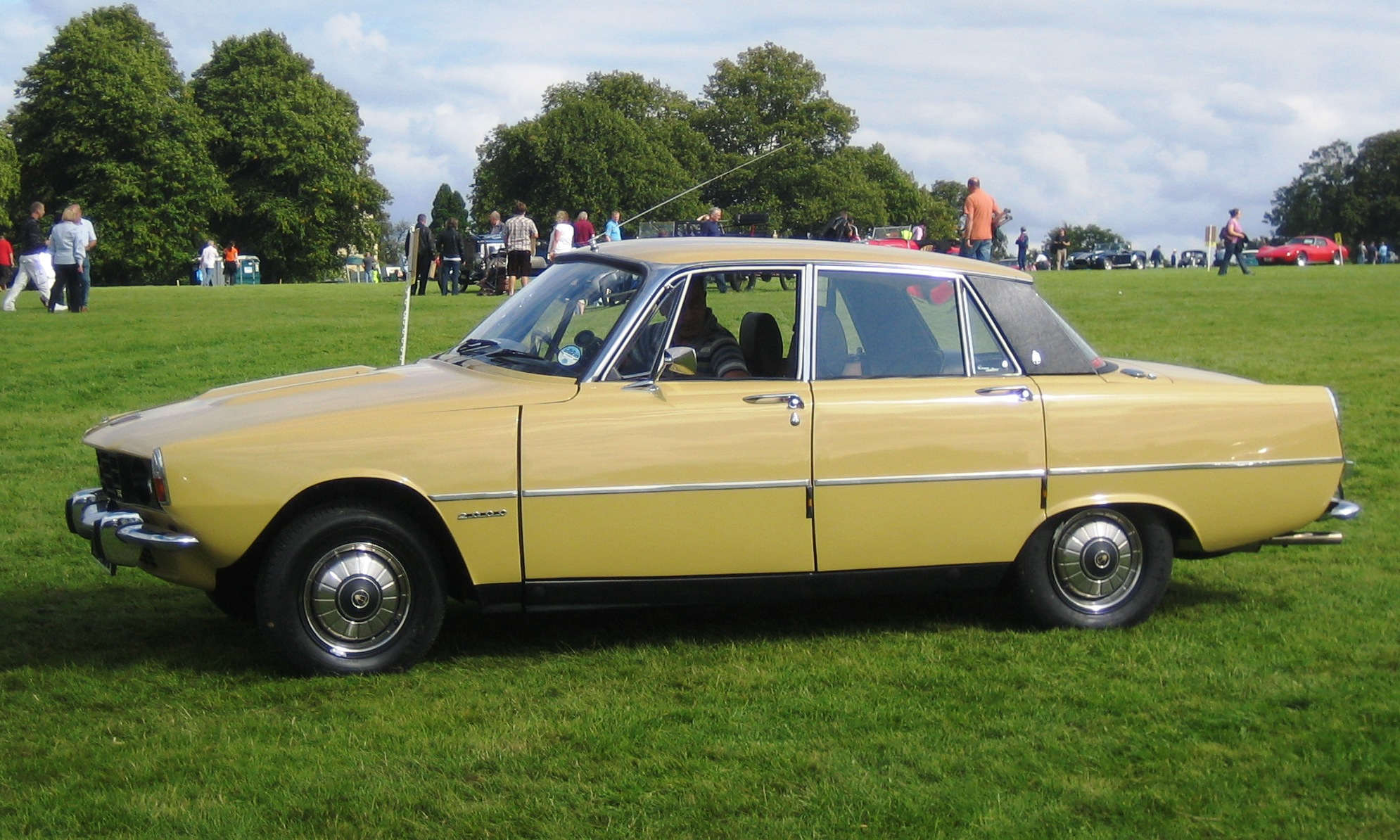
Rover 2000

==== Rover 2000 ====
With his 1963 Rover P6, Bache broke new ground not only with its external styling, but with its imaginative interior styling too, including an "open plan" dashboard and individual rear bucket seats.

Bache's design for a big Rover saloon to compete with Jaguar's XJ6 was cancelled at the last moment. A mid-engined coupé prototype was also cancelled.

=== British Leyland ===
A period of unrest in the British car industry began and Rover was absorbed, first into the Leyland Motor Corporation and then into British Leyland (BL). This upheaval resulted in the cancellation of the big Rover and the coupé projects that Bache was involved with.

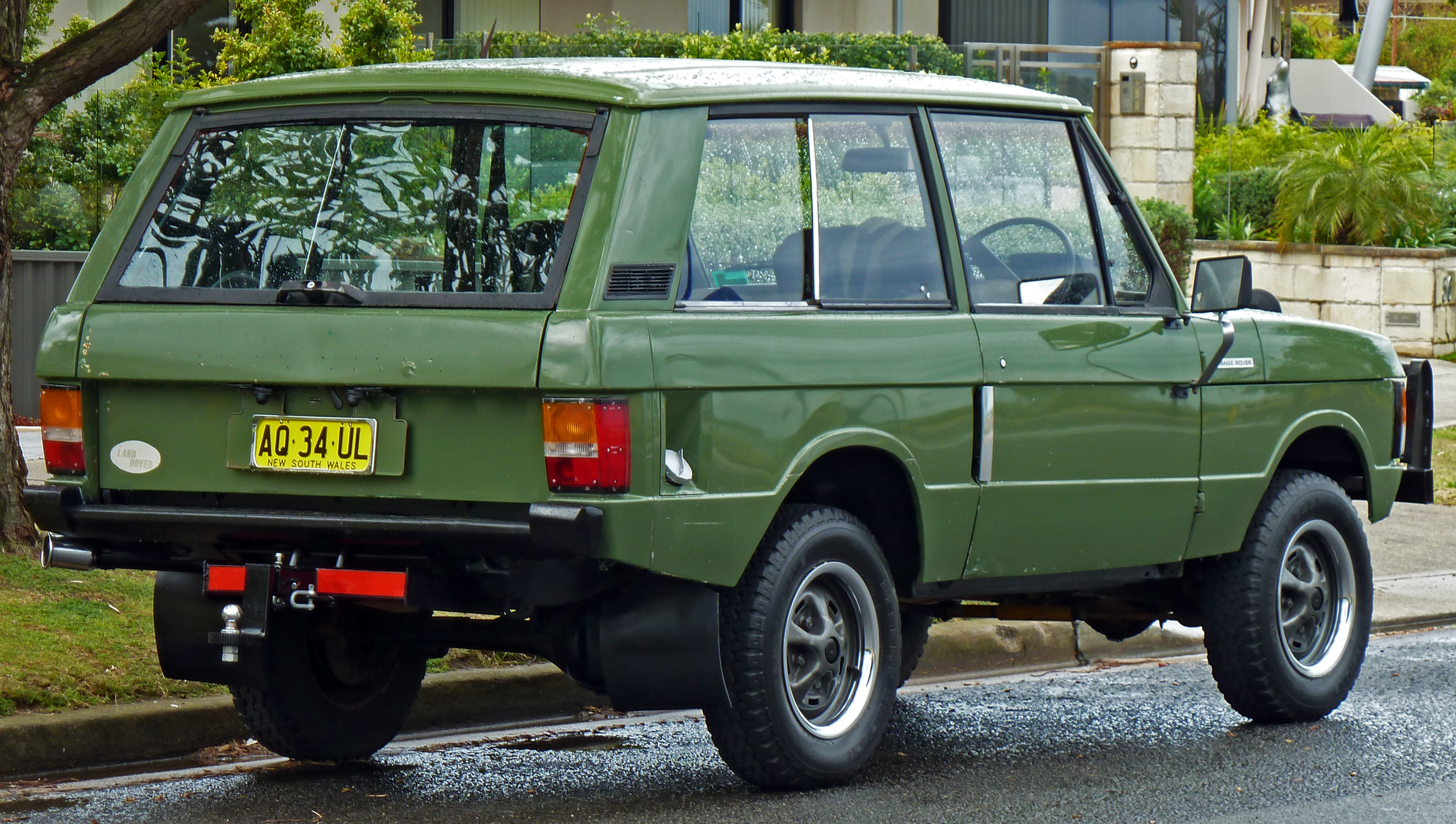
rear view of 1972-1984 Land Rover Range Rover 3-door

==== Range Rover ====
Bache had a hand in the styling of the Range Rover that was launched in 1970, although the basic lines had already been defined by Spen King and Gordon Bashford. David Bache smoothed the prototype's functional lines and must share in the credit for the car's award-winning design.

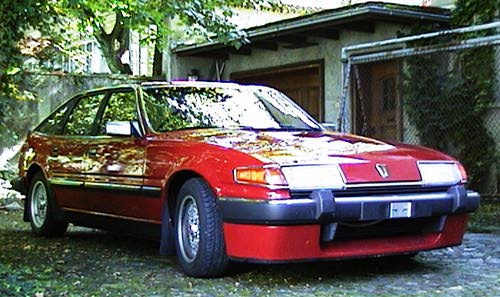
Rover SD1

==== Rover SD1 ====
Bache's final Rover was the 1976 SD1 - the replacement for his P6. It was notable for its ground-breaking five-door hatchback design on a large executive car and its bold interior, winning the 1977 European Car of the Year award. Its success was hampered by BL's notorious production and reliability problems.

==== Metro and Maestro ====
As chief stylist at BL, Bache was also involved in the design of the 1980 Austin Metro. He also made improvements to Ian Beech's Austin Maestro design, which was launched in 1983.

After being forced to resign from his post by newly installed BL chief Harold Musgrove in 1982 following disagreements over the yet-to-be-launched Austin Maestro, and his replacement by Roy Axe, he set up his own design company, David Bache Associates which worked outside the motor industry as much as inside it.

== Death ==
On 26 November 1994 Bache died from cancer. He was married, with two sons and one daughter.

== Some of his cars ==
- Rover P5
- Land Rover Series II
- Rover P6
- 1964 Rover-BRM gas turbine car (with William Towns)
- Range Rover
- Rover SD1
- Austin Mini Metro
- Austin Maestro
