= 12 =

Twelve or 12 most often refers to:

- 12 (number), the natural number following 11 and preceding 13
- Dozen, a group of twelve

It may also refer to:

== Date and time ==
- 12 BC
- AD 12
- 1912
- 2012
- December, the twelfth and final month of the year

== Film ==
- Twelve (2010 film), based on the 2002 novel
- 12 (2007 film), by Russian director and actor Nikita Mikhalkov
- 12 (2003 film), by American filmmaker Lawrence Bridges

== Literature ==
- 12: The Elements of Great Managing, a 2006 business book by Rodd Wagner and James K. Harter
- Age 12, 2012 manga by Nao Maita
- Twelve (novel), 2002, by Nick McDonell
- Twelve, a 2007 novel by Lauren Myracle, part of The Winnie Years
- Twelve (publisher), an imprint of Grand Central Publishing
- Twelve, a 2009 novel by Jasper Kent

== Music ==
- 12 (The Notwist album), 1995
- 12 (Herbert Grönemeyer album), 2007
- 12 (Keller Williams album), 2007
- 12 (Fiskales Ad-Hok album), 2009
- 12 (ASAP Twelvyy album), 2017
- 12 (Sloan album), 2018
- 12 (American Song Book), Mina album, 2012
- 12 (Ryuichi Sakamoto album), 2023
- 12!, Sonny Stitt album, 1972
- Twelve (Cobalt 60 album), 1998
- Twelve (Patti Smith album), 2007
- Twelve (Iz*One album), 2020
- "12", Westside Gunn Mixtape, 2025
- "12", a song by Insane Clown Posse from the album Riddle Box
- "12", a song by The 1975 from the album The 1975
- "12", a song by Mirror, 2021

== Transportation ==
- Tatra 12, a mid-size car
- Rover 12, various mid-size cars produced by Rover
- Renault 12, a mid-size family car
- Line 12 (disambiguation), various rapid transit lines

== Other uses ==
- Twelve (company), a chemical technology company in Berkeley, California
- Twelve (Street Fighter), a video game character from the Street Fighter series
- iOS 12, an operating system by Apple
- 12 Victoria, an asteroid in the asteroid belt
- 12, a slang term for law enforcement
- 12 July, also known as "Orangeman's Day", an annual series of parades held by the Orange Order

== See also ==
- Twelves, Brazilian pet monkey
- Magnesium (atomic number), a chemical element
- Twelfth
- The Twelve (disambiguation)
- XII (disambiguation)
- One-two (disambiguation)
- 12 rating (disambiguation) or 12+
- List of highways numbered 12
