= Rover P1 =

Rover P1 may refer to any of the following automobiles produced by the Rover Company between 1933 and 1938:

- Rover 10 P1 (1933–1938)
- Rover 12 P1 (1934–1936)
- Rover 14 P1 (1933–1938)

== See also ==
- Rover P2 (disambiguation), the successor to the P1
