= 12 Train =

12 Train active can refer to:

- 12 (New York City Subway service), unused
- Paris Metro Line 12
- Line 12 (Beijing Subway)
- Line 12 (Shanghai Metro)

== Trains active ==
- Line 12 (disambiguation)
