= Founderism =

Reverence for the founders of the United States

Founderism (being a Founderist) is an intellectual outlook that has a strong "reverence for the founders" of the United States. The term is viewed as a pejorative epithet, accusing those so labeled as having a worldview that sacrifices historical accuracy for turning the "founding into a fetish".

The antonym "anti-founderism" is applied to those who "seem convinced that there was something profoundly wrong with the origins" of the state.

== See also ==
- Founder's syndrome
