= XII =

XII may refer to:

- 12 (number) or XII in Roman numerals
- 12th century or XII in Roman numerals
- XII (Neal McCoy album), 2012
- XII (Brian Culbertson album), 2010
- XII (single), a 2019 single album by K-pop singer Chungha, featuring the song "Gotta Go"
- hypoglossal nerve (XII), twelfth cranial nerve
- The Big 12 Conference, a U.S. college athletic conference whose logo consists of a stylized "XII"

== See also ==
- 12 (disambiguation)
- The Twelve (disambiguation)
