= Rover P2 =

Rover P2 may refer to any of the following automobiles produced by the Rover Company between 1937 and 1948:

- Rover 10 P2 (1939–1947)
- Rover 12 P2 (1937–1948)
- Rover 14 P2 (1938–1948)
- Rover 16 P2 (1937–1948)
- Rover 20 P2 (1939)

== See also ==
- Rover P1 (disambiguation), the predecessor to the P2
- Rover P3, the successor to the P2
