= 012 =

012 may refer to:

- Tyrrell 012, a Formula One racing car
- Pretoria, South Africa (dialing code 012)

== See also ==
- 12 (disambiguation)
