= Route 12 =

Route 12 may refer to:

- One of several highways - see List of highways numbered 12
- One of several public transport routes - see List of public transport routes numbered 12
