= Founder's syndrome =

Founder(s) maintaining disproportionate control

Founder's syndrome (also founderitis) is the difficulty faced by organizations, and in particular young companies such as start-ups, where one or more founders maintain disproportionate power and influence following the effective initial establishment of the organization, leading to a wide range of problems. The syndrome occurs in both non-profit and for-profit organizations or companies.

== Problem ==
In an organization, the passion and charisma of the founder(s), often sources of the initial creativity and productivity of the organization, can become limiting or destructive. It may simply limit further growth and success, or it may lead to bitter factionalism and divisions as the scale of demands made on the organization increases, or it may result in outright failure.

== Symptoms ==
An organization suffering from founder's syndrome typically presents many of the following symptoms:

- The organization is strongly identified with the founder; a result sometimes believed to be related to the founder's ego.
- Obsessive leadership style compared to a more standard behavior.
- Autocratic decision-making (autocratic management style): Founders tend to make all decisions in early start-up companies, big and small, without a formal process or feedback from others. Decisions are made in crisis mode, with little forward planning. Staff meetings are held generally to rally the troops, get status reports, and assign tasks. There is little meaningful strategic development, or shared executive agreement on objectives with limited or a complete lack of professional development. Typically, there is little organizational infrastructure in place, and what is there is not used correctly. Furthermore, the founder has difficulty making decisions that benefit the organization because of their affiliation.
- Higher levels of micromanagement by checking on employees or colleagues subject matter work instead of maintaining and evolving the overall company's picture.
- Entrepreneurs show higher levels of bias (e.g. overconfidence) than do managers in established organizations.
- There is no succession plan.
- A failing so-called leadership transition within first couple of years leading to consequences such as trust, morale, unforeseen future for the business.
- The founder has difficulty with adapting to changes as the organization matures.
- The culture of the leadership team and company plays an important role for success or failure.
- Often the founder's idea is central to the initial business and clients of the company, so that if markets change, the need for the initial idea might vanish.
- Key staff and board members are typically selected by the founder and are often friends and colleagues of the founder. Their role is to support the founder, rather than to lead the mission. Staff may be chosen due to their personal loyalty to the founder rather than skills, organizational fit, or experience. Board members may be under-qualified, under-informed or intimidated and will typically be unable to answer basic questions without checking first.
- Professionally trained and talented recruits, often recruited to resolve difficulties in the organization, find that they are not able to contribute in an effective and professional way.
- The founder begins to believe their own press/PR and other marketing related issues.
- The founder, who is usually the CEO or managing director, suffers HiPPO (Highest-paid-person's opinion), which means that often their ideas, decisions, etc. keep winning over the actual better ideas, decisions, etc.
- The founder becomes increasingly paranoid as delegation is required, or business management needs are greater than their training or experience.
- Falling into two traps:
  - Actions without a goal or
  - Wrong actions based on defined goal

The founder responds to increasingly challenging issues by accentuating the above, leading to further difficulties. Anyone who challenges this cycle will be treated as a disruptive influence and will be ignored, ridiculed or removed. The working environment will be increasingly difficult with decreasing trust. The organization becomes increasingly reactive, rather than proactive. Alternatively, the founder or the board may recognize the issue and take effective action.

== Responses ==
=== Novel management and leadership ===
There exists no single cure against founder's syndrome, as every new business endeavor is different, however companies (newly founded or larger organizations with internal groups) are providing new insights and answer to the problem. A good example for better managing is Gallup's 12: The Elements of Great Managing, which is a survey-based work or Google's re:Work project, which is available to internal managers and the public.

=== Plan of action ===
Coping with founder's syndrome requires discussion of the problem, a plan of action, and interventions by the founder, the board, and/or by others involved in the organization. The objective of the plan should be to allow the organization to make a successful transition to a mature organizational model without damage to either the organization itself or the individuals concerned.

== Criticism ==
- Despite the negative and positive symptoms listed above, according to one study focused on "knowledge-intensive technology" companies, founders with a so-called hands-on management style, which can be interpreted as micromanagement or obsessive or similar, are more likely to retain employees and see their firms thrive.
- On the contrary to the ego issue, overconfidence can be seen as a positive attribute.
- Some persons provide opposite recommendations and advice such as "Do Everything and Anything" or "It's your company - You decide."
- Entrepreneurs generally tend to be confident or overconfident, or they do not become entrepreneurs in the first place

== See also ==
- Benevolent dictator for life
- Disruptive innovation
- Emotions in decision-making
- Founder's dilemma
- Illusion of control
- Management style
  - Micromanagement
- Organizational culture
- Overconfidence effect
- Peter principle
