= Organizational founder =

Person who creates a new organization

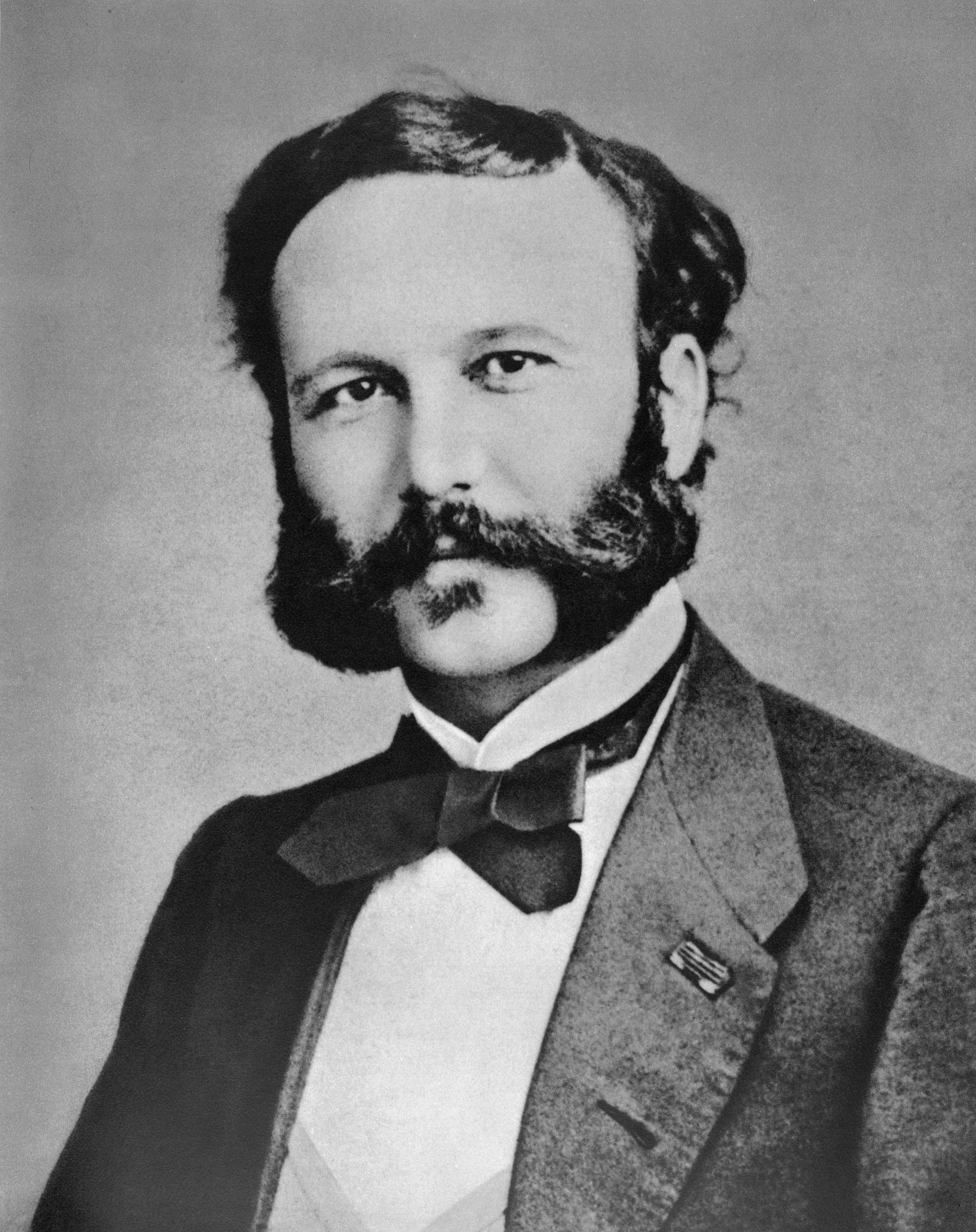
Henry Dunant, co-founder of the Red Cross

An organizational founder is a person who has undertaken some or all of the formational work needed to create a new organization, whether it is a business, a charitable organization, a governing body, a school, a group of entertainers, or any other type of organization. If there are multiple founders, each can be referred to as a co-founder. If the organization is a business, the founder is usually referred as an entrepreneur. If an organization is created to carry out charitable work, the founder is generally considered a philanthropist.

== Issues arising from the role ==
A number of specific issues have been identified in connection with the role of the founder. The founder of an organization might be so closely identified with that organization, or so heavily involved in its operations, that the organization can struggle to exist without the founder's presence. "One practical way to cope with overreliance on a founder is to distribute management duties so that others are clearly responsible for important operations. If the founder is on the nonprofit's board, part of the solution is to make sure that the board is diverse, balanced, and regularly infused with new blood".

=== Legal status ===
The language of securities regulation in the United States considers co-founders to be "promoters" under Regulation D. The U.S. Securities and Exchange Commission's definition of "Promoter" includes: (i) Any person who, acting alone or in conjunction with one or more other persons, directly or indirectly takes initiative in founding and organizing the business or enterprise of an issuer; however, not every promoter is a co-founder. In fact, there is no formal, legal definition of what makes someone a co-founder. The right to call oneself a co-founder can be established through an agreement with one's fellow co-founders or with permission of the board of directors, investors, or shareholders of a startup company. When there is no definitive agreement, like a shareholders' agreement, disputes about who the co-founders are, can arise.

=== Founder emeritus ===
Some organizations maintain a connection with their founder by establishing a position of founder emeritus, either as an entirely symbolic post, or as a position with some power, such as a permanent position on the board of directors. A drawback to such an arrangement is the possibility that the founder will clash with the person who has replaced them as leader of the organization, and that such a conflict will affect the performance of the founder emeritus as a board member.

=== Founder's dilemma ===
In some instances, the desire of the founder to maintain control over the organization becomes a problem because, when an entrepreneurial organization is successful, "[i]t outgrows the ability of the founder, or even of a small team around the founder, to control". The Harvard Business Review identified this problem as the founder's dilemma, noting that in most successful companies, the founder is pushed out of control by investors within the first few years after the formation of the company. In some cases, a company may have multiple founders, and a prominent source of conflict can be disagreements between these founders as the company evolves. There are factors beyond the personality and professional accolades of a startup founder that impact the ability of a company to succeed, like trouble in funding, sudden market shutdown, not having the right team or poor scaling plan.

=== Forgotten founder ===
Another problem that can arise is that of the forgotten founder, a person who participates early on in the formation of an enterprise, but leaves or is ousted before it achieves success, and then returns to claim a legal right to equity, intellectual property, or some other fruits of that success. To avoid this problem, it is advised that the entity "incorporate early and issue shares that are subject to vesting over time".

== See also ==
- Founder's syndrome
- Founder CEO
