= One-two =

One-two, 1-2, 1 & 2 or 1+2 may refer to:

== Sports ==
- Push and run, in association football
- One-two combo, in boxing

== Music ==
- One, Two, album by Sister Nancy
- "One Two", song by Future from The Real Me, 2026
- 1 + 2 (album), album by Recoil
- Volumes 1 & 2 (The Desert Sessions album), 1998
- Volumes, 1 & 2 (Smith & Myers EPs), 2020

== Other uses ==
- One & Two, 2015 independent film
- OnePlus 2, an Android smartphone released in 2015
- Schweizer SGU 1-2 glider

== See also ==
- One-Two-Two, Parisian landmark
- 12 (disambiguation)
- Onetwo (band), English duo
