= The Twelve =

The Twelve may refer to:

== Arts and entertainment ==
- The Twelve, a fictional organisation in the Killing Eve TV series and Codename Villanelle book series on which it is based
- The Twelve (comics), a Marvel Comics limited series
- The Twelve (novel), by Justin Cronin, 2012
- The Twelve (YA novel), by Liz Hyder, 2024
- "The Twelve" (poem), a Russian poem by Alexander Blok, 1918
- Apocalypse: The Twelve, a Marvel Comics crossover storyline
- The Twelve, an anthem by William Walton, with text by W.H. Auden
- The Twelve (Belgian TV series), a 2019 Belgian television series
  - The Twelve (Australian TV series), a 2022 Australian remake of the Belgian series
- The 12, a 2015 rock musical composed and co-written by Neil Berg

== Religion ==
- Anunnaki, or twelve gods of the underworld, in ancient Hittite religion
- Quorum of the Twelve, or the Twelve, one of the governing bodies of the Latter Day Saint movement
- Twelve Apostles, or the Twelve, the primary disciples of Jesus
- The Twelve Imams, the spiritual and political successors to the Islamic prophet Muhammad in the Twelver branch of Shia Islam
- Twelve Tribes of Israel, descended from the twelve sons of prophet Jacob
- Twelve Minor Prophets, authors of religious works in the Jewish Tanakh and the Christian Old Testament
- Twelve Olympians, the major deities of the Greek pantheon
- Twelve Devas, Japanese Buddhist deities

== Other uses ==
- "The Twelve", a group of Swedish women including Ellen Key who improved working class ladies' manners
- Twelve astrological signs of the zodiac

== See also ==
- 12 (disambiguation)
- El Libro de los Doce ('The Book about the Twelve'), a book about the Cuban revolution by Carlos Franqui
