= List of public transport routes numbered 12 =

In public transport, Route 12 may refer to:

- Route 12 (MTA Maryland), a bus route in Baltimore, Maryland and its suburbs
- Citybus Route 12, a bus route in Hong Kong
- London Buses route 12
- Melbourne tram route 12
- Nockebybanan, a tramway in Stockholm

== See also ==
- Line 12 (disambiguation)
