= 12: The Elements of Great Managing =

2006 book by Rodd Wagner and James K. Harte

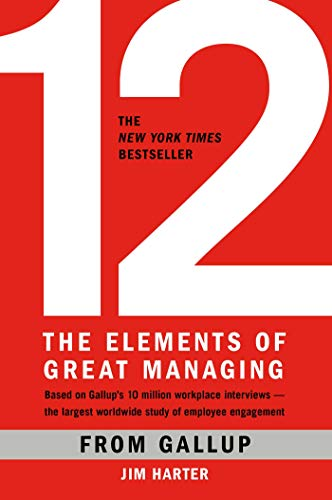
- Author: Rodd Wagner & James K. Harter, Ph. D
- Language: English
- Subject: Management, employee engagement, stories of great managers
- Genre: Nonfiction
- Published: December 2006 (Gallup Press)
- Publication place: United States
- Media type: Print, Hardcover
- Pages: 237
- ISBN: 978-1-59562-998-2
- OCLC: 75632016
- Dewey Decimal: 658 22
- LC Class: HD38.2 .W345 2006

12: The Elements of Great Managing is a 2006 New York Times bestseller written by Rodd Wagner and James K. Harter. It is the sequel to First, Break All the Rules, although the first book was written by Marcus Buckingham and Curt Coffman. Both books are based on The Gallup Organization's research on employee engagement and database of employee opinions.

== Content ==
12 tells the story of a dozen managers selected from Gallup's global database of 10 million interviews with managers and employees. Each of the chapters in 12 is based on one of the "Q^{12}" statements that emerged from Gallup's meta-analysis comparing employee attitudes with workgroup performance. These range from employee's "knowing what's expected" and having the needed "materials and equipment" to more emotional assessments such as whether employees feel their opinion counts and chances to "learn and grow." The story of each manager profiled in the book is interrupted mid-chapter to describe the psychology behind the particular question Gallup asks in its employee surveys.

The most controversial of the statements, write Wagner and Harter, is the tenth: "I have best friend at work." The authors claim friendships, in combination with the other "elements," create better customer scores, better retention, better safety, and higher productivity and profitability. "In the battle between company policy and human nature, human nature always wins," states the book. "Companies do far better to harness this kind of social capital than to fight against it."

The book also includes a chapter on compensation. The authors assert that pay is such a "status-laden, envy-inspiring, politically charged monster" that it cannot be measured in the same way as the aspects that make up the bulk of the book. Being based in research on how people react in real life, rather than in theory, 12 is a mainstream application of behavioral economics.
