= Line 12 =

Line 12 may refer to:

== Asia ==
- Line 12 (Beijing Subway), China
- Line 12 (Dalian Metro), China
- Line 12 (Guangzhou Metro), China
- Line 12 (Hangzhou Metro), China
- Line 12 (Ningbo Rail Transit), China
- Line 12 (Shanghai Metro), China
- Line 12 (Shenzhen Metro), China
- Line 12 (Wuhan Metro), China
- Line 12 (Mumbai Metro), India
- Putrajaya line, or Line 12, Malaysia
- Toei Ōedo Line, originally Line 12, Tokyo, Japan

== Europe ==
- Line 12 (Barcelona Metro), a shuttle train on the Barcelona–Vallès Line, Spain
- Line 12 (Madrid Metro), Spain
- Line 12 (Moscow Metro), Russia
- Paris Metro Line 12, France
- S12 (ZVV), Zurich, Switzerland

== North America ==
- 12 (BMT rapid transit service), New York City, US (defunct)
- Mexico City Metro Line 12, Mexico
- Saint-Jérôme line, also designated as line 12, a commuter rail service in Greater Montreal, Quebec

== South America ==
- Line 12 (CPTM), São Paulo, Brazil

== See also ==
- List of public transport routes numbered 12
