= Sangster =

Sangster is a surname of early medieval Scottish origin. Notable people with the name include:

- Charles Sangster (1822–1893), Canadian poet
- Charles Thomas Brock Sangster, English motorcycle manufacturer
- Donald Sangster (1911–1967), former Jamaican Prime Minister/leader
- Donald F. Sangster, Canadian geologist
- George Sangster (ornithologist), Dutch ornithologist
- Jack Sangster (1896–1977), English motorcycle manufacturer
- James Sangster (1796–1866), Canadian farmer and politician
- James Alexander Sangster (1861–1937), Canadian merchant and politician
- Jimmy Sangster (1927–2011), Welsh screenwriter
- John Sangster (1928–1995), Australian jazz musician
- Katherine Sangster, Scottish politician
- Margaret Sangster (radio writer) (1894-1981), American writer
- Margaret Elizabeth Sangster (1838–1912), American poet
- Mike Sangster (1940–1985), English tennis player
- Robert Sangster (1936–2004), English racehorse owner and breeder
- Samuel Sangster (1804?–1872), British engraver
- Thomas Brodie-Sangster (born 1990), English actor
- Will Sangster (born 1978), Australian rules footballer

== See also ==
- Sangster's, Jamaican liqueur
- Robert Sangster Stakes, South African horseracing race
- Sangster Elementary School, school located in the suburb of Springfield, Virginia
- Sir Donald Sangster International Airport, an international airport in Montego Bay, Jamaica
