= LG6 =

LG6 or variation, may refer to:

- General Motors LG6, a General Motors 60° V6 engine
- Lagonda LG6, a British car
- Lower Group 6, of the Bushveld Igneous Complex
- Zhonghe metro station (station code LG06) on the Circular line and Wanda–Zhonghe–Shulin line in New Taipei, Taiwan
- Daugavpils Municipality (LG06), Latvia; see List of FIPS region codes (J–L)

== See also ==
- Chromatica (#LG6), Lady Gaga's 6th studio album
- LG (disambiguation)
