= Jack Sangster =

British industrialist (1896–1977)

- Born: 29 May 1896; Kings Norton, Worcestershire, England
- Died: 26 March 1977 (aged 80); Belgravia, London, England
- Education: Hurstpierpoint College
- Occupation: Motorcycle manufacturer
- Years active: 1918–1961
- Children: Heather Sangster

John Young Sangster (29 May 1896 – 26 March 1977) was a British industrialist and philanthropist. He was an important figure in the British motorcycle industry, where he was involved with Ariel, BSA and Triumph.

== Early life ==
Sangster was born in Kings Norton, Worcestershire, England. He was the second of three sons of Charles Thomas Brock Sangster, an engineer and the owner of Cycle Components Ltd, which in 1902 became known as the motorcycle brand Ariel.

After his education at Hurstpierpoint College in Sussex, Sangster began an engineering apprenticeship, but it was interrupted by the First World War. During the war, he served with the City of Birmingham battalion of the 14th Royal Warwickshire Regiment. His elder brother Fredrick Charles Sangster was killed in action in 1916.

== Career ==
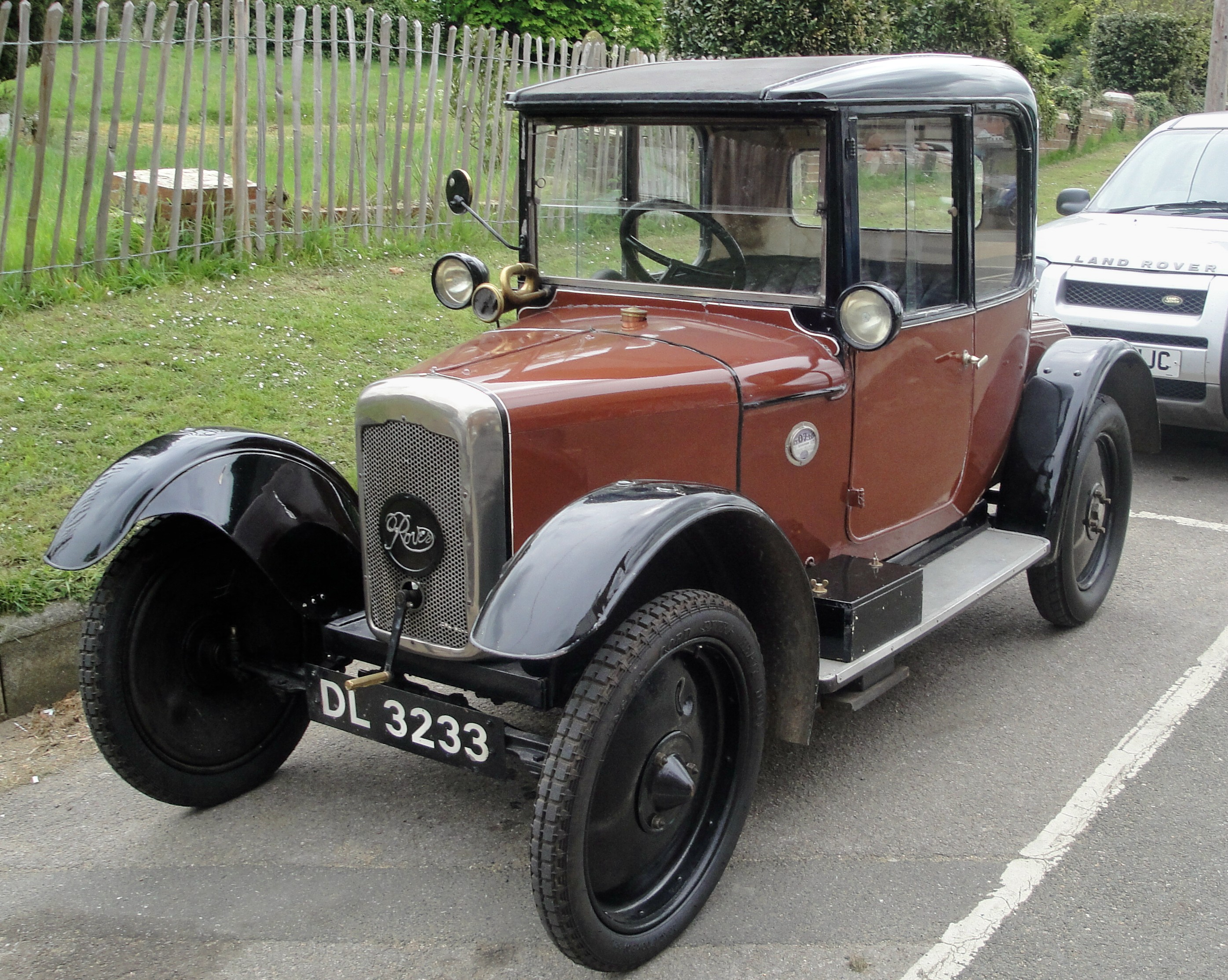
The Rover 8

In 1918, Sangster joined the Cycle Components Manufacturing Company, where his father was managing director. He designed a small low-cost car, which the company began manufacturing. The car's design was later sold to the Rover Company in Coventry, and Sangster joined Rover to manage the production of the car which became the Rover 8.

Sangster returned to his father's company in 1923, and by 1930 he was joint managing director, but Cycle Components went bankrupt two years later. Sangster bought most of CC'S assets and started a new company, Ariel Motors, which he developed with some of CC's former designers and engineers, including Val Page, Bert Hopwood, and later Edward Turner.

Sangster developed a motorcycle with a 4 hp White and Poppe engine, which proved extremely successful. He added 586 cc and 992 cc machines to the company's line, setting the standard for competitions at the time.

In 1936, Sangster bought the financially struggling Triumph Motorcycles company, renamed it Triumph Engineering Co., and brought in Edward Turner from Ariel to improve the product range. The Triumph Speed Twin, with a parallel-twin engine designed by Turner, was introduced in 1938, and it was followed by a series of successful Triumph motorcycles until the early 1980s.

Sangster sold Ariel to the BSA company in 1944, and in 1951 he sold Triumph to BSA for £2.5 million, a good return on his initial £50,000 investment in 1936. He joined the board of BSA following the acquisition of Triumph, and after a series of boardroom battles that ousted the previous chairman, Sir Bernard Docker, Sangster became chairman of BSA in 1956. He appointed Turner as Chief Executive of the Automotive Division—comprising BSA, Ariel, Triumph, Daimler, and Carbodies (makers of London taxicabs). Sangster retired as chairman of BSA in 1961.

In 1944, he took in two London evacuees, Gordon and Jean Rookledge. He declined a peerage in 1962.

Sangster died in Belgravia, London, on 26 March 1977 from cancer.
