= Rover 8 =

The Rover 8 was a small single-cylinder 8 hp 1327 cc car made by the British Rover car company. It was Rover's first production car. It was remarkable for being supported by a backbone chassis rather than a conventional ladder frame. The first model was manufactured from 1904 to 1912. A Daimler-Knight sleeve valve engine option was available on the original model in 1911 and 1912.

Following World War I a new 998 cc (later 1134 cc) twin-cylinder "8 hp" light car was offered from 1919 to 1925. It was in its turn superseded in 1924 by a four-cylinder 1074 cc Rover 9.

== 1904–1912 ==
Rover 8
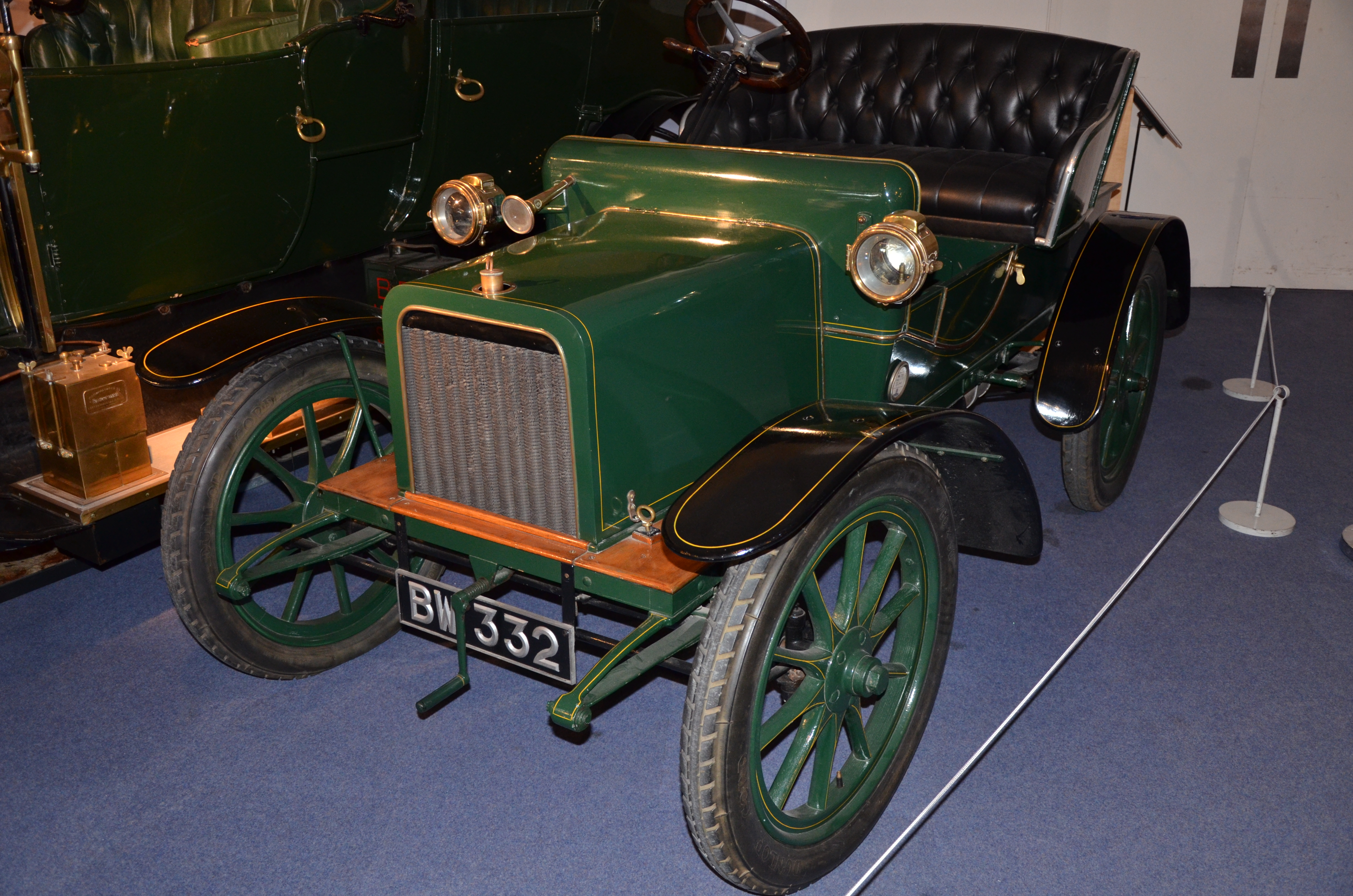
- 1904 open 2-seater at Coventry Transport Museum

Overview
- Manufacturer: Rover
- Production: 1904–1912
- Designer: Edmund W. Lewis

Body and chassis
- Layout: FR
- Related: Rover 6

Powertrain
- Engine: Base (1904-1912): 1327 cc single cylinder, 8 bhp (6 kW) at 900 rpm Optional (1911-1912): 1052 cc single cylinder Knight sleeve valve engine, 9 bhp (7 kW)
- Transmission: 3-speed manual

Dimensions
- Wheelbase: 1,981 mm (78 in) base, 2,134 mm (84 in) optional
- Length: 2,591 mm (102 in) base, 3,048 mm (120 in) optional
- Width: 1,372 mm (54 in) base, 1,448 mm (57 in) optional
- Kerb weight: approx. 10.5 long cwt (0.53 t)

The car, designed by Edmund Woodward Lewis (1870-1941) who had joined Rover from Daimler, had an unusual structure. Instead of the conventional chassis, the car had a backbone structure, formed by the engine crankcase, the gearbox housing, a rigid tubular propeller shaft housing, and the rear axle housing; the whole described as having a box girder section. The backbone frame, without bump-compliance at the rear apart from the tyres, was suspended from the front axle at just one point by a pivoted transverse leaf spring which made no contribution to transverse rigidity, and thus the whole remaining car rested on just three points, similar to the design of old, four-wheeled farm tractors.

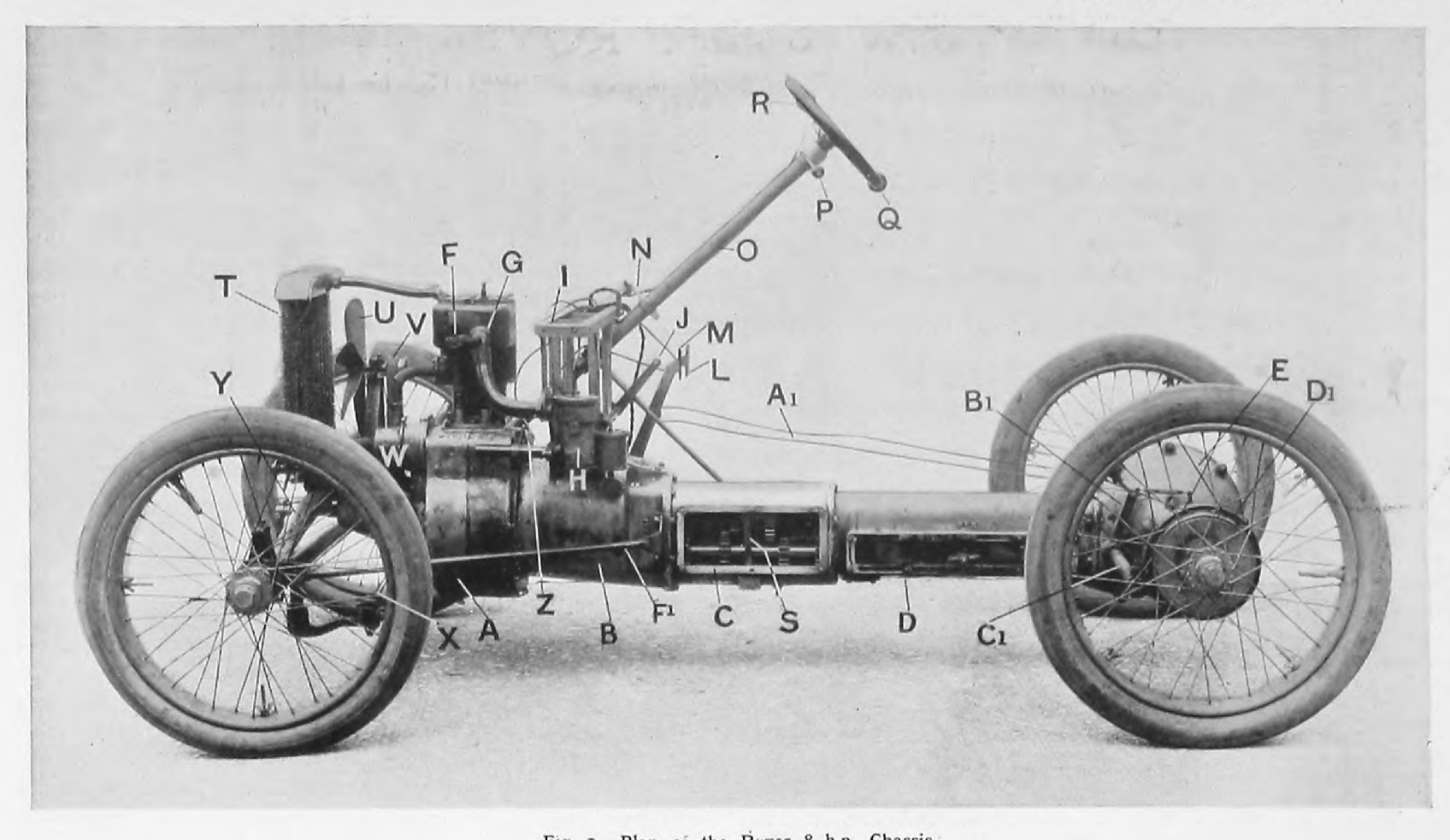
chassis in elevation

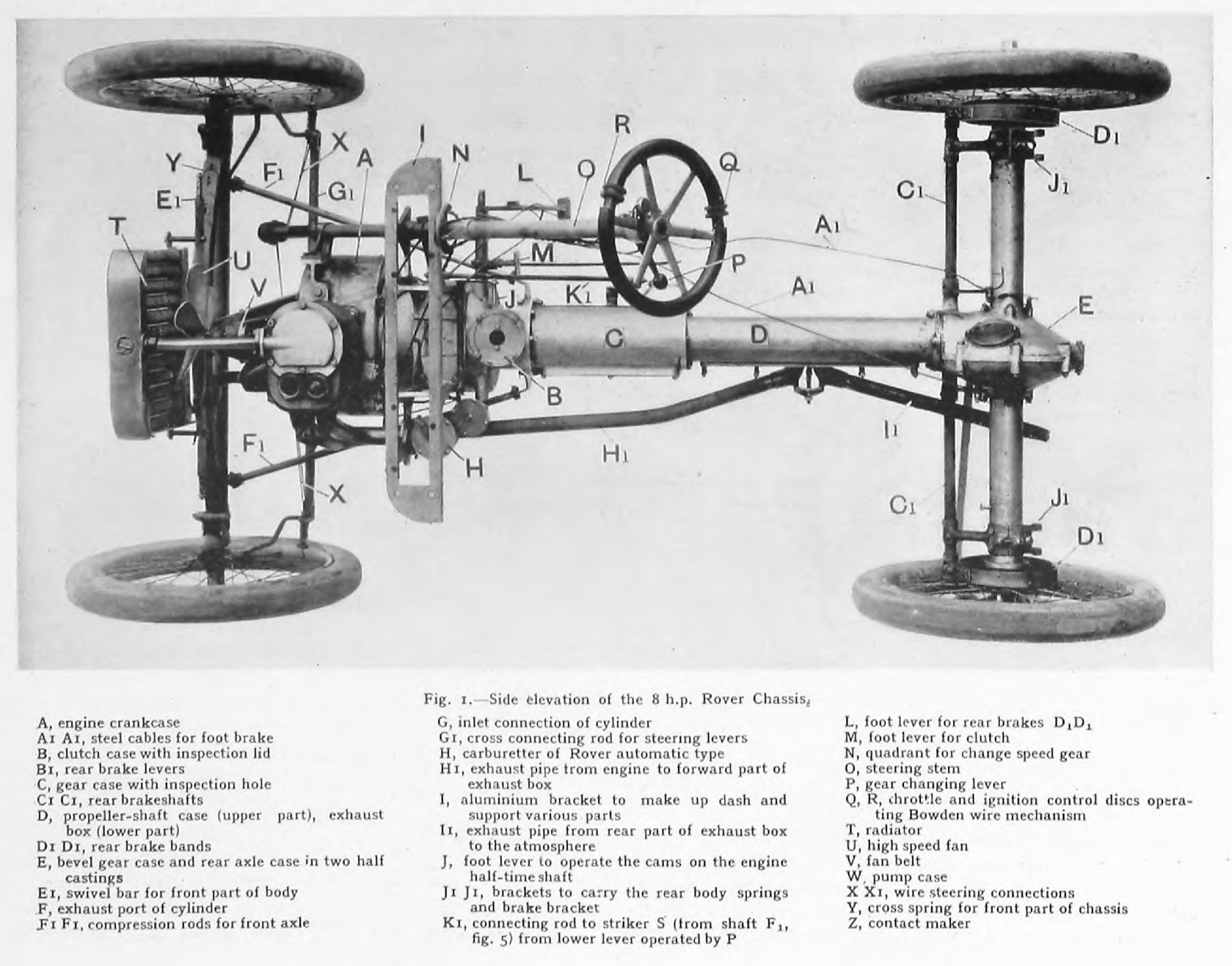
chassis in plan

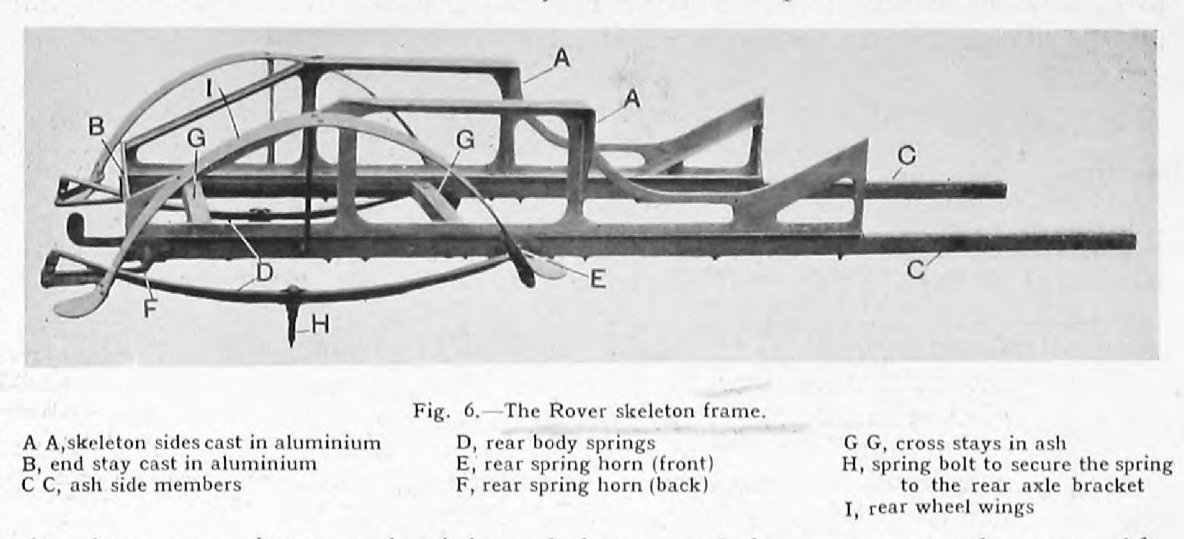
body sub-frame

The body, through its own sub-frame, was mounted on the rear axle using semi-elliptic springs.

The single-cylinder engine displaced 1327 cc with a bore of 4.5 in (110 mm) and stroke of 5 in (130 mm). Its inlet and exhaust valves were both mechanically operated.

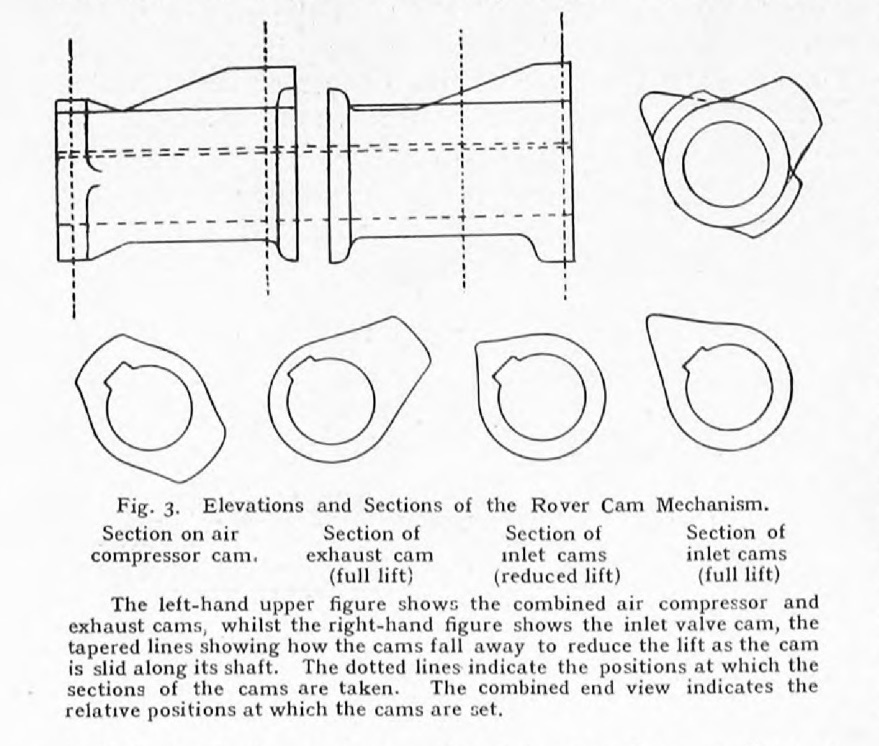
cam profiles

=== Engine braking ===
It had an unusual pedal control that changed over the valve operating cams to provide extra engine braking.

When it was wished to slow the engine a driver's foot lever moved the cams first to reduce valve lift and then second, on further pressure, the valves are closed completely and the engine is effectively an air compressor slowing the rear wheels.

At the engine's normal speed of 900 rpm it produced 8 horsepower (6 kW), the same number as its RAC tax rating. If desired the engine could be accelerated up to 1,500 rpm by judicious adjustment of both the throttle and the ignition timing. Above the combustion chamber an aluminium inspection plate may be removed to inspect water jacket spaces for blockage or potential blockage. The crankshaft and camshaft were fitted with large ball races. The sparking plug sits just above the inlet valve. Electric current is provided by an accumulator (battery) and a Bassée-Michel high-speed trembler coil and timed with a wide contact. Wires are able to be kept very short. Should there have been any experience of short circuiting a switch on the steering wheel centre switched off the current without a hand leaving the wheel.

A propeller draws water from the base of the radiator pushing it up through the engine's water jackets to the radiator's top tank from where it descends to the base again through twelve copper tubes carrying aluminium gills. A pulley on the end of the crankshaft drives a belt to a fan drawing air through the radiator.

The metal to metal type clutch runs in oil. It has an engine driven bell-shaped clutch forced by a coil-spring on the output shaft to engage with a floating cast iron disc which transmits power to the three-speed gearbox. The speeds provided by the gearbox are:

1st: 8 mph (13 km/h)
2nd: 16 mph (26 km/h)
3rd or top gear: 24 mph (39 km/h)
reverse: 8 mph (13 km/h)

Top gear is a direct drive through from the clutch to the rear bevel on the differential within the back axle's aluminium casting. Economical production is provided by making the gearbox from just three sizes of gear wheel. The change speed lever is at the bottom of the steering wheel operated through a concentric tube around the steering column.

Steering and suspension

The front axle is made from steel tube. Ball cup swivel pins are mounted at each end with a slight set given the wheel axles. A cross rod joins the steering levers on each wheel. The cross rod is linked to the foot of the steering column by double cable which rotates around the steering column. A spring is incorporated in the cable so that only one of the cables is tight. The small diameter of the steering spindle was claimed to obviate road shock.

There are compression rods from the gearbox casing to stay each end of the front axle and minimise deflection by road shock.

The rear axles are mounted on ball bearings and encased with the differential in one aluminium casting. The bolt which fastens the long semi-elliptical springs which support the back of the body are fastened to the same casing. The differential casing has an inspection cover as does the gearbox and clutch.

Lubrication

The engine is lubricated by the splash system. During regular maintenance the clutch case, the gearbox case and the rear axles are fed with lubricant through the inspection covers.

Brakes

The brakes on the back wheels are all wrought iron using malleable iron drums. They are controlled by foot lever operating through compensating wires.

Body

The two passengers are provided with bucket type seats, the driver's shallower and less comfortable than the passenger's. The body's two sides are formed by a cast aluminium skeleton supported by ash side members. The two sides are braced against each other by the seats in front and a cast aluminium stay at the back. There are more ash cross-members at the base. Rover claims an easily made and handsome body can be fitted to this frame. The rear springs are exceptionally long.

=== Trial by The Autocar ===
Autocar's staff drove the 2-seater car for ten days covering some 400 miles (640 km). The control turning the engine into an air brake is sufficient for most purposes and the double band brakes are only needed for the steepest hills or an emergency stop. Turning the car at a very sharp angle puts greater tension on the ignition or throttle control and the engine speed is upset. The car has a good turn of speed and climbs extremely well hills.

Since introduction modifications include removing the gearbox casing from its part in the car's backbone, improved gear changing and better access for the carburettor.

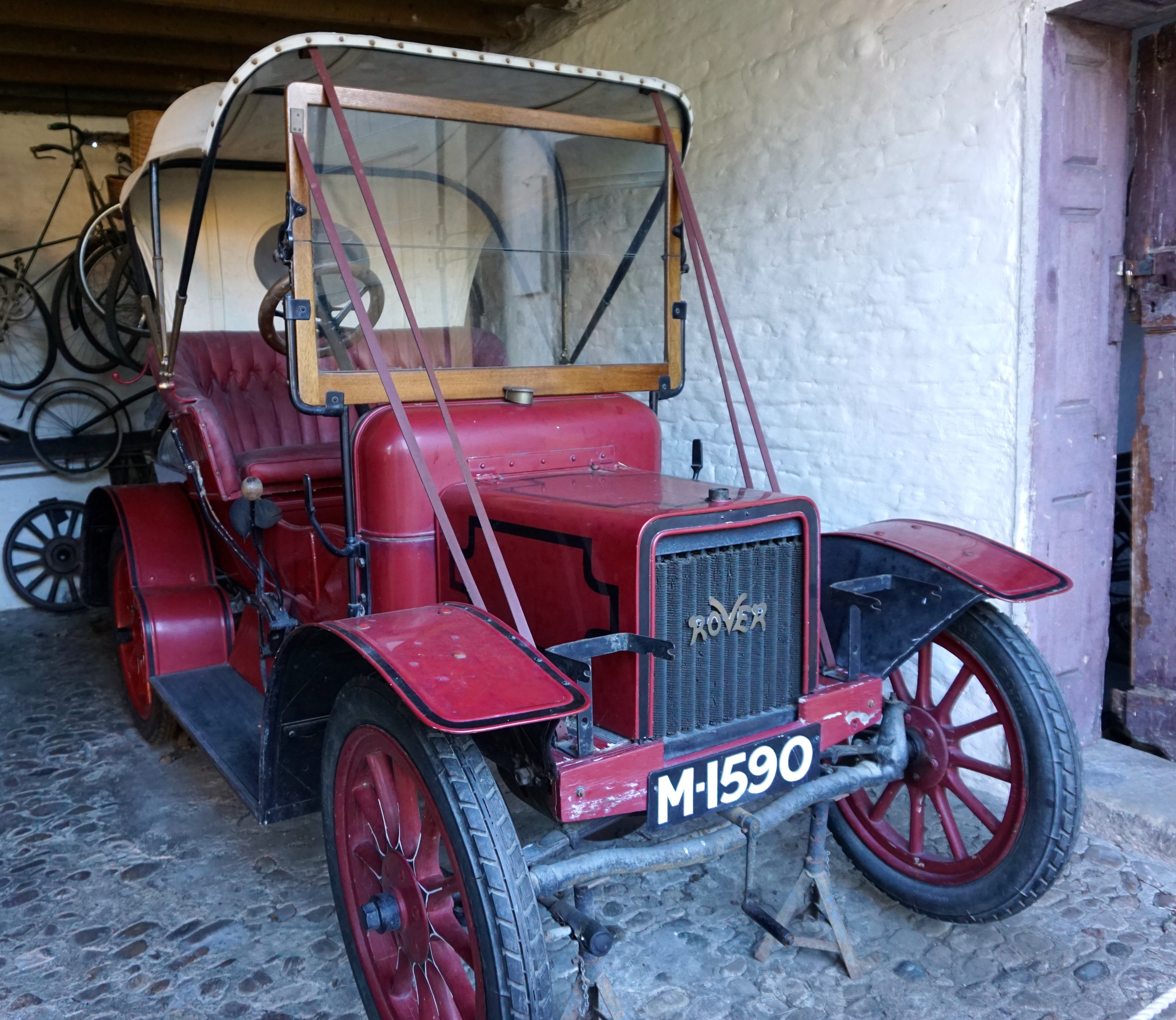
1907 open 2-seater

=== Frame change ===
By 1907, Rover had discontinued the backbone frame and was using an ash chassis with steel flitch plates. Robert Jefferson and Robert Weallas drove a Rover 8 from Coventry to Istanbul, becoming the first people to cross Europe in an automobile.

Most of this series of Rover 8 cars seem to have had a very basic open two seat body with no windscreen or other weather protection.

At launch the Rover 8 cost £200 on the home market.

=== Sleeve-valve engine ===
In 1911, the Rover 8 was offered with a 1052 cc sleeve-valve unit. Daimler built the Daimler-Knight sleeve-valve engine.

The cars with the sleeve-valve engines used the long-wheelbase chassis with the larger dimensions.

== 1916-1925 ==
Rover 8
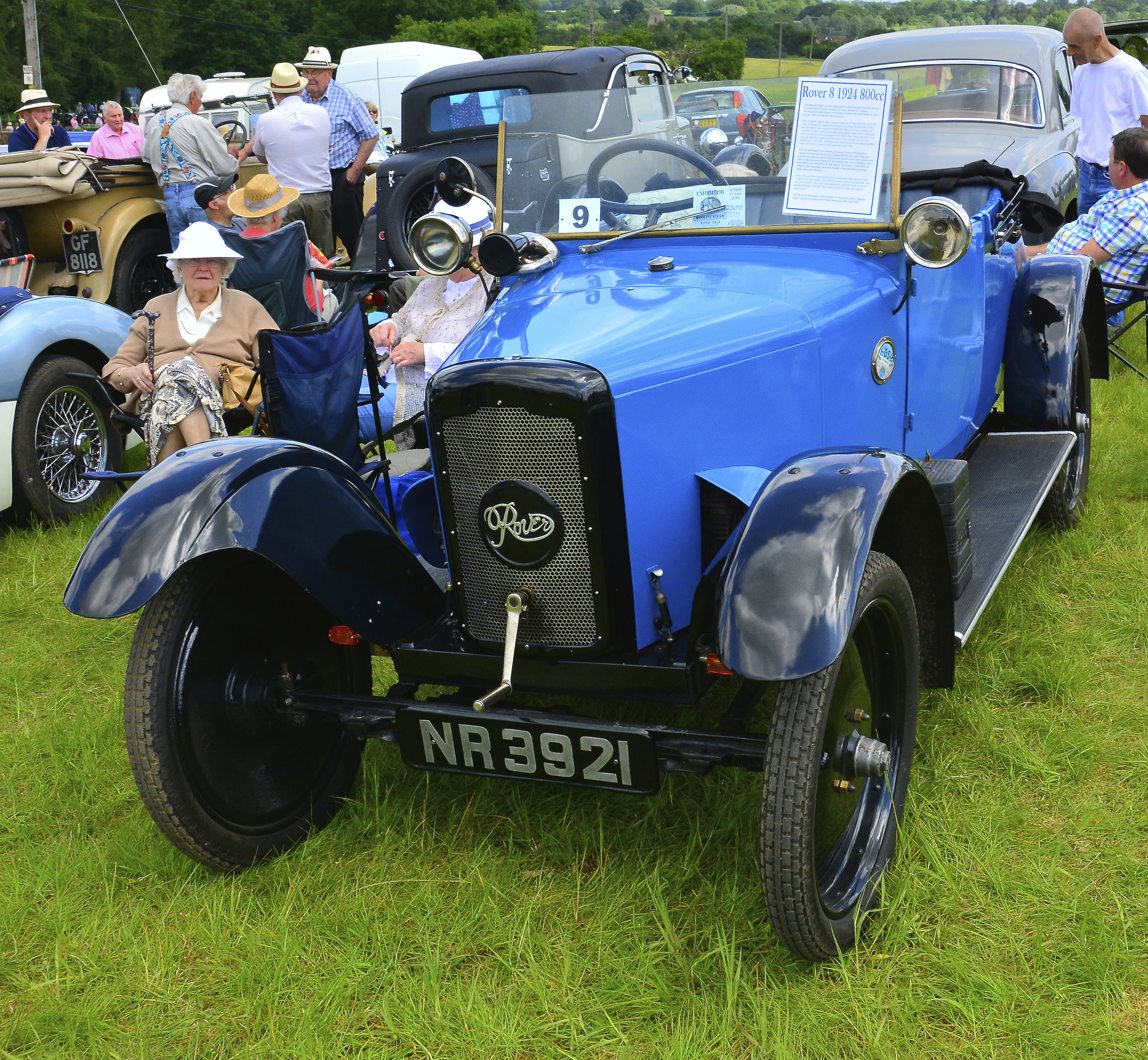
- 1924 open 2-seater

Overview
- Manufacturer: Rover
- Production: 1916–1925; 17,700 made
- Designer: Jack Sangster

Body and chassis
- Body style: open 2-seater or 4-seater; fixed head coupé; light commercial chassis

Powertrain
- Engine: 1.0 or 1.1 L two-cylinder side valve
- Transmission: 3 speed manual, with reverse

Dimensions
- Wheelbase: 88 inches (2,235 mm) or 94 inches (2,388 mm)
- Length: 123 inches (3,124 mm) or 135 inches (3,429 mm)
- Width: 58 inches (1,473 mm)
- Kerb weight: 1,120 lb (510 kg)

Chronology
- Successor: Rover 9/20

The Rover 8 light car announced in October 1917 was designed by Jack Sangster largely before he joined Rover. Built in a new factory in Tyseley, Birmingham it was driven to Coventry to have its body fitted. It was a great sales success for the company.

The air-cooled, side valve, engine was a horizontally opposed twin and was originally of 998 cc capacity, with a bore of 85 mm and a stroke of 88 mm, but this was increased to 1134 cc with a 100 mm stroke in 1923. This did not affect the RAC hp rating, which remained 8 hp. The original engine had a peak output of 13 bhp (10 kW) at 2600 rpm. Although there was a conventional looking radiator it was a dummy. Cooling was supplied through air scoops on the side of the bonnet and it was rumoured that after hard driving at night the cylinder heads could be seen glowing red through them,. Two cross-members of the frame supported at three points the assembled unit of engine and clutch and a three speed gearbox with reverse. The rear wheels were driven through a fabric joint and propeller shaft to a universal joint and an under-worm wheel type rear axle. A dynamo was belt driven from the propeller shaft. An electric starter was optional from 1923. A six volt lighting set was provided.

The chassis was a simple perimeter frame with quarter-elliptic leaf springs all around. This cantilever springing and the rack and pinion steering were both regarded as unusual at the time. Wheels were steel and detachable. Brakes were fitted to the rear wheels only with a separate set of shoes for the handbrake. The wheelbase was extended from 88 inches (2,200 mm) to 94 inches (2,400 mm) in 1924 to allow genuine four seat bodies to be offered including a fabric four seat saloon.

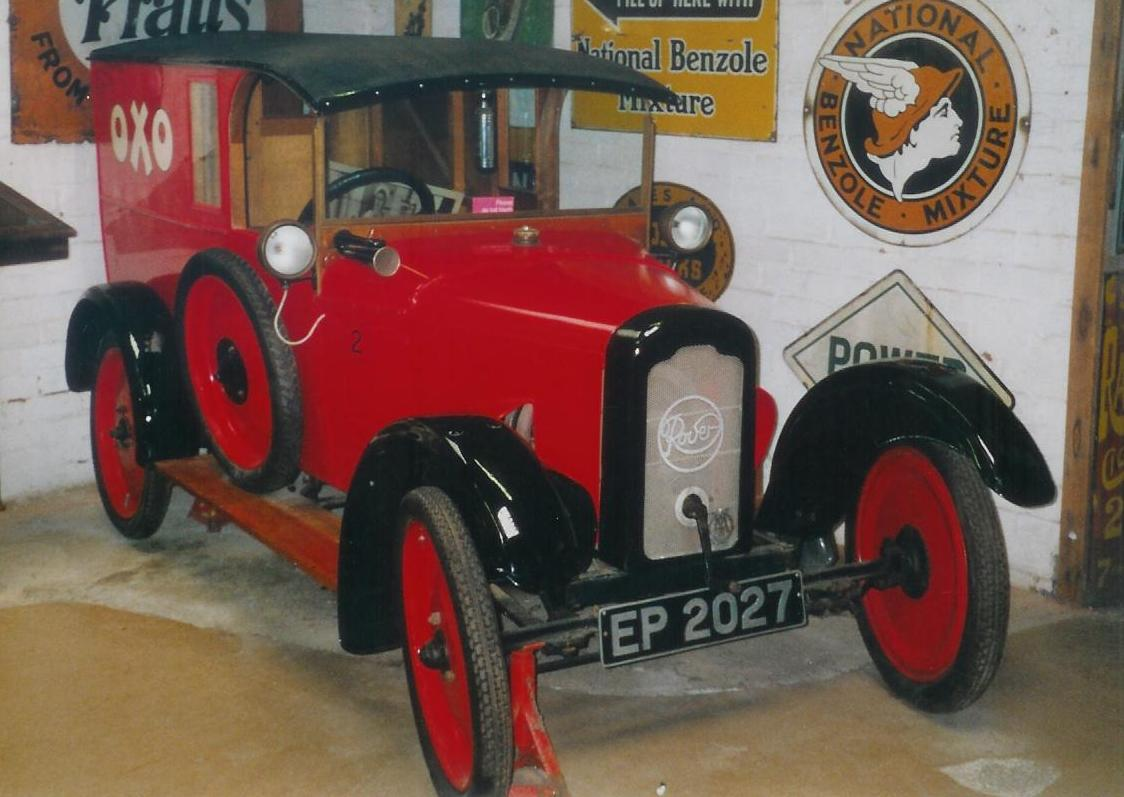
1922 van

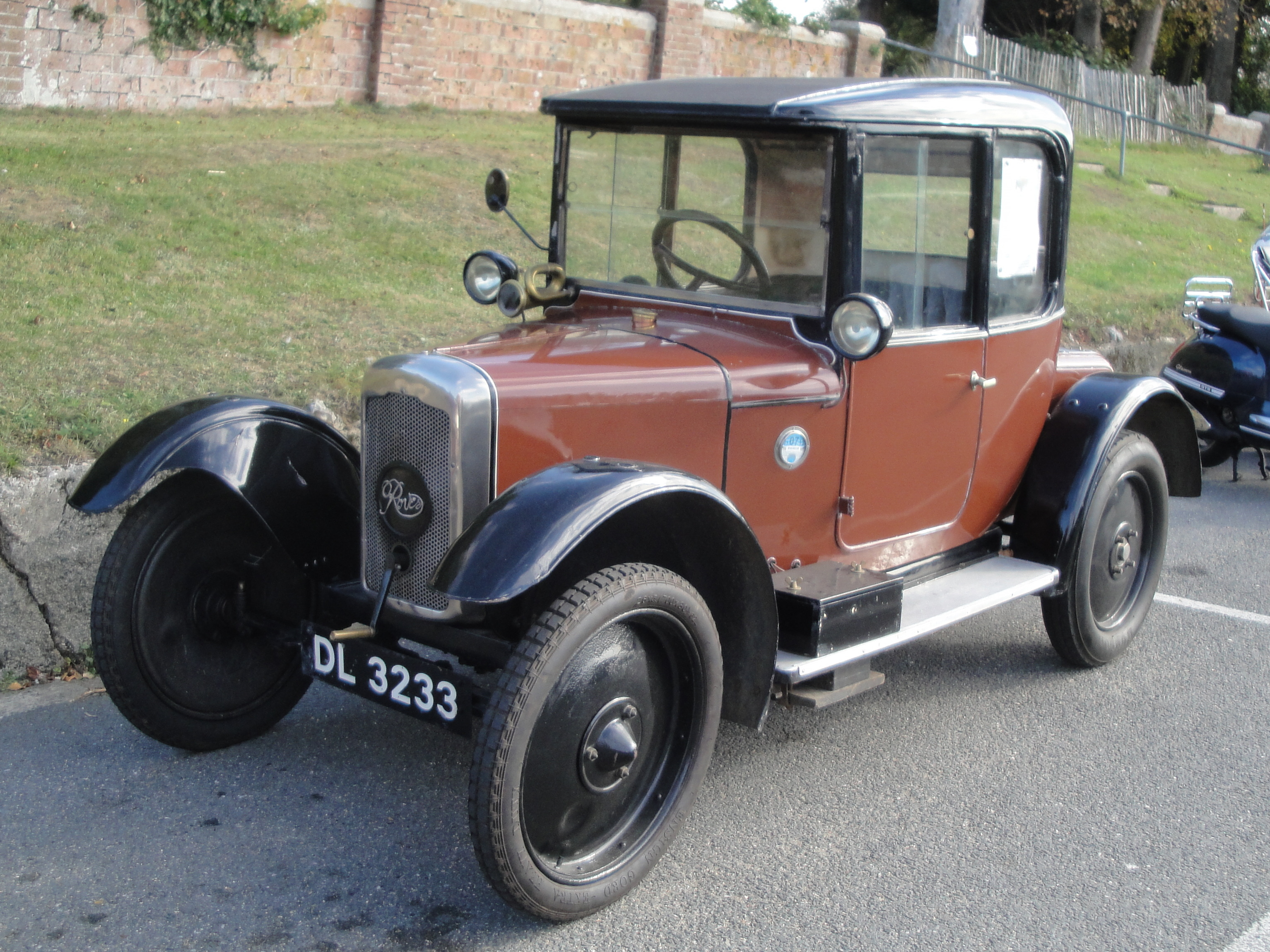
1923 fixed head coupé

Open two seater bodies with dickie seats were usual but an open 3 or 4-seater body was shown at the October 1922 Motor Show on a wheelbase 6 in (150 mm) longer at 94 in (2,400 mm) and a few closed 2 seater coupés were also made from 1923 as well as light commercials.

The car cost £230 in 1919, but was reduced to £139 by 1925. It could attain 45 mph (72 km/h) and could return 45 mpg_{‑imp} (6.3 L/100 km; 37 mpg_{‑US}).

Optional extras included: non-standard colour £5, speedometer £7, side curtains to hood completely enclosing the body £3.

In November 1921 engine lubrication was improved and the body given more room inside. Its shape's appearance was also improved.

Improved valves were fitted from October 1922 made of special steel to remedy over-heating.

The Rover 8 was made under licence in Germany, with a slightly larger engine, by Peter-und-Moritz between 1921 and 1923.

=== Road test by The Times ===
The motoring correspondent of The Times reported in October 1922 the car's road manners were an agreeable surprise, it was astonishing how little one missed the other two cylinders. There was no speedometer but the maximum on a level road seemed to be about 40 mph (64 km/h). Seating was comfortable with adequate room all round. A driver's side door was missed. Altogether a great little car.

== Sources ==
- Baldwin, N. (1994). A-Z of cars of the 1920s. UK: Bay View Books. ISBN 1-870979-53-2.
- Culshaw, David; Horrobin, Peter (2013) [1974]. "Rover". The Complete Catalogue of British Cars 1895 - 1975 (e-book ed.). Poundbury, Dorchester, UK: Veloce Publishing. ISBN 978-1-845845-83-4.
- Posthumus, Cyril (1977). "Slump and Recovery". The Story of Veteran & Vintage Cars. John Wood, illustrator. Feltham, Middlesex, UK: Hamlyn. p. 78. ISBN 0-600-39155-8.
- Robson, Graham (1977). The Rover Story: A Century of Success (First ed.). Cambridge, UK: Patrick Stephens. ISBN 1-85260-175-2.
- Wise, David Burgess (1970). Vintage Motorcars. Illustrated by Peter Griffin. UK: National Magazine. p. 12. SBN 852230078.
- Wood, Jonathan (January 2008). Bowler, Michael (ed.). "Rover 8". The Automobile. 25 (11). Cranleigh, UK: Enthusiast Publishing. ISSN 0955-1328.
