= Lagonda LG45 =

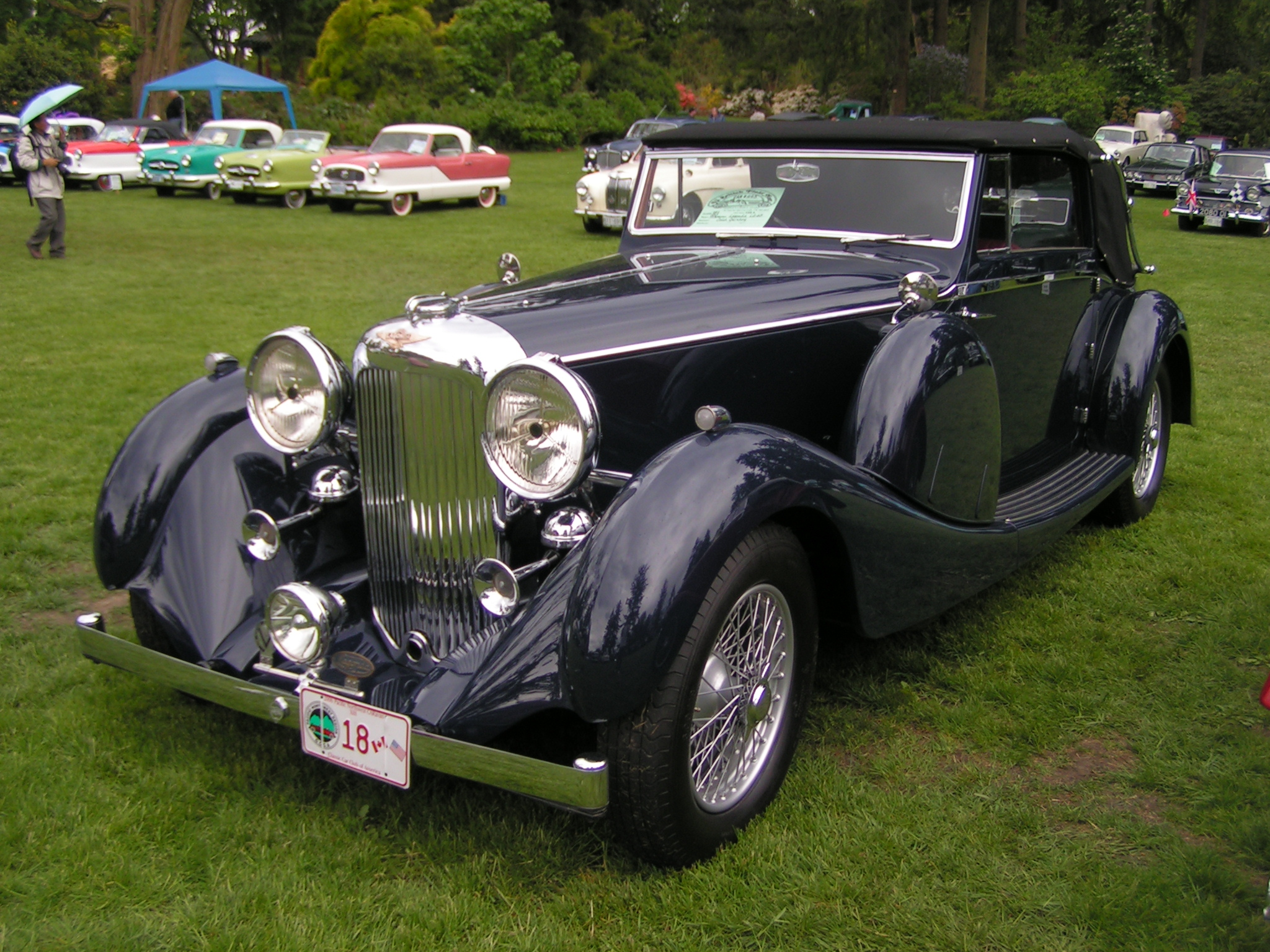
- A 1936 Lagonda LG45, in Lethbridge, Canada in 2007.

Overview
- Manufacturer: LG Motors (Staines) Ltd.
- Production: 1935–1937; Around 278–303 cars, including 25 Rapides.

Body and chassis
- Body style: Tourer; Coupé

Powertrain
- Engine: 4453 cc Meadows I6
- Transmission: 4-speed manual

Dimensions
- Wheelbase: 129 in (3,277 mm)

Chronology
- Predecessor: Lagonda M45
- Successor: Lagonda LG6

The Lagonda LG45 is a sports car built by the British Lagonda company from late 1935 until 1937. The company had entered receivership in 1935 and had been reformed as LG Motors (Staines) Ltd. The new company carried on largely as before, renaming this evolution of the Lagonda M45 to reflect the new company name and the car's 4.5-litre engine. The M45's Meadows-designed, 115 bhp (86 kW) engine was also given various updates engineered by recent hire W. O. Bentley, including a new exhaust manifold and twin magneto ignition. These resulted in power increasing to 128 bhp (95 kW) for the final iterations. The engine's displacement is 4.5 L (4,453 cc; 271.7 cu in), from a bore and stroke of 88.5 mm (3 31/64 in) and 120.7 mm (4 3/4 in). Unveiled in September 1935, it also featured hydraulic shock absorbers and rubber engine mounts.

The LG45 underwent continuous revisions during the construction period, with the three main models being referred to as Sanction 1, 2, and 3, with each revision adding more and more Bentley designs. In late 1937, the car was updated yet again and renamed the Lagonda LG6.

A Lagonda LG45 driven by Richard Seaman and Freddie Clifford finished fourth in the 1936 24 Hours of Spa. It also entered the 1936 French Grand Prix, and the 1937 24 Hours of Le Mans.

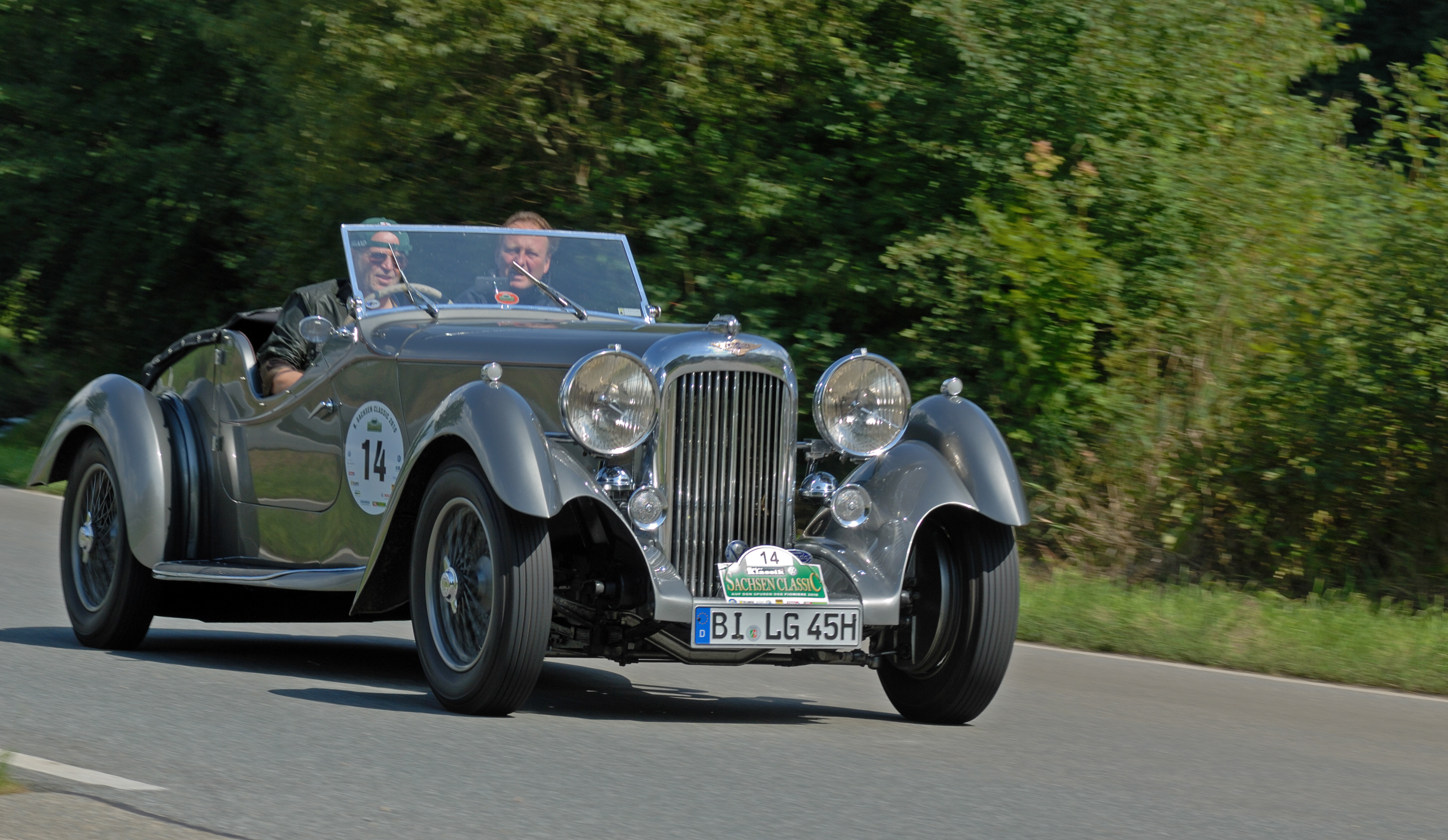
Lagonda LG45 Rapide 1936

Lagonda LG45 two-door Tourer

LG45 Rapide cockpit
