= Samuel Sangster =

British line-engraver

- Born: c. 1804
- Died: 24 June 1872; London
- Occupation: Line-engraver

Samuel Sangster (c.1804 – 24 June 1872) was a British line-engraver.

== Biography ==
Sangster was born about 1804. He was a pupil of William Finden, and several of his earlier plates were engraved for the ‘Amulet’ and other annuals, then in the height of their prosperity. These works included ‘Beatrice,’ after Henry Howard, R.A., engraved for the ‘Anniversary’ of 1829; ‘Don Quixote,’ after R. P. Bonington, for the ‘Keepsake Français,’ 1831; and ‘The Death of Eucles,’ after B. R. Haydon, ‘The Lute,’ after H. Liverseege, ‘The Festa of Madonna dei Fiori,’ after Thomas Uwins, R.A., and ‘No Song, no Supper,’ after Henny Meadows, for the ‘Amulet’ of 1832 and succeeding years. He afterwards engraved some larger plates, of which the best are ‘The Gentle Student’ and ‘The Forsaken,’ both from pictures by Gilbert Stuart Newton, R.A., ‘Neapolitan Peasants going to the Festa of Piè di Grotta,’ after Thomas Uwins, R.A., for Finden's ‘Royal Gallery of British Art,’ ‘The Prayer of Innocence,’ after the same, and ‘Le Christ aux Fleurs,’ after Carlo Dolci. He engraved ‘The Young Mendicant's Noviciate,’ after Richard Rothwell, R.H.A., for the Royal Irish Art Union, and other plates for the ‘Art Journal.’ The latter comprised ‘A Syrian Maid,’ after H. W. Pickersgill, R.A., ‘The Victim,’ after A. L. Egg, R.A., ‘Juliet and the Nurse,’ after H. P. Briggs, R.A., and ‘The Sepulchre,’ after W. Etty, R.A., all from the pictures in the Vernon Collection, and ‘A Scene from Midas,’ after Daniel Maclise, R.A., and ‘First Love,’ after J. J. Jenkins, from pictures in the Royal Collection. He likewise painted in oils some fancy subjects.

Sangster died at 83 New Kent Road, London, on 24 June 1872, in his sixty-eighth year, but he had some time before retired from the practice of his art.
