= Charles Thomas Brock Sangster =

- Born: 16 May 1872; Aberdeen, Aberdeenshire, Scotland
- Died: 18 March 1935 (aged 62); Birmingham. Warwickshire
- Occupation: Motorcycle manufacturer
- Children: Jack Sangster; Fredrick Charles Sangster

Charles Thomas Brock Sangster (16 May 1872 – 18 March 1935) was a British engineer and industrialist.

Sangster was born in Aberdeen and was named after his godfather, fireworks manufacturer Charles Thomas Brock. He attended school in Aberdeen before continuing his education at King's College London. He was apprenticed to Messrs. Linley & Biggs, noted cycle engineers and makers of "Whippet" spring frame cycles at Clerkenwell Road, London. Fellow employees included William Chater Lea, who would become noted for his Chater-Lea bicycles, motorcycles, and automobiles, J.G.H. Browne, who would later build "North Road" cycles, and J. A. Poole, inventor of the expanding stem method of handlebar adjustment.

His early associations date to beginning of the safety bicycle. He worked with the New Howe Cycle Co., of Glasgow, and then with the Coventry Machinists Company a predecessor to the Swift concern. He then went to Components, Ltd., in 1895.

For more than thirty years Sangster was managing director of Components, Ltd., and occupied a similar office in the Ariel Company. He was also chairman of the Swift Company for a considerable period, and also owned or controlled the Rover Cycle Co., the Midland Tube & Forging Co., the Endless Rim Co., and other companies. Sangster was president of the Motor and Cycle Trades Benevolent Fund in 1921.

Charles's first born Fredrick Charles Sangster was killed in action during 1916. His second son Jack Sangster went on to become chairman of BSA.
