= Lagonda LG6 =

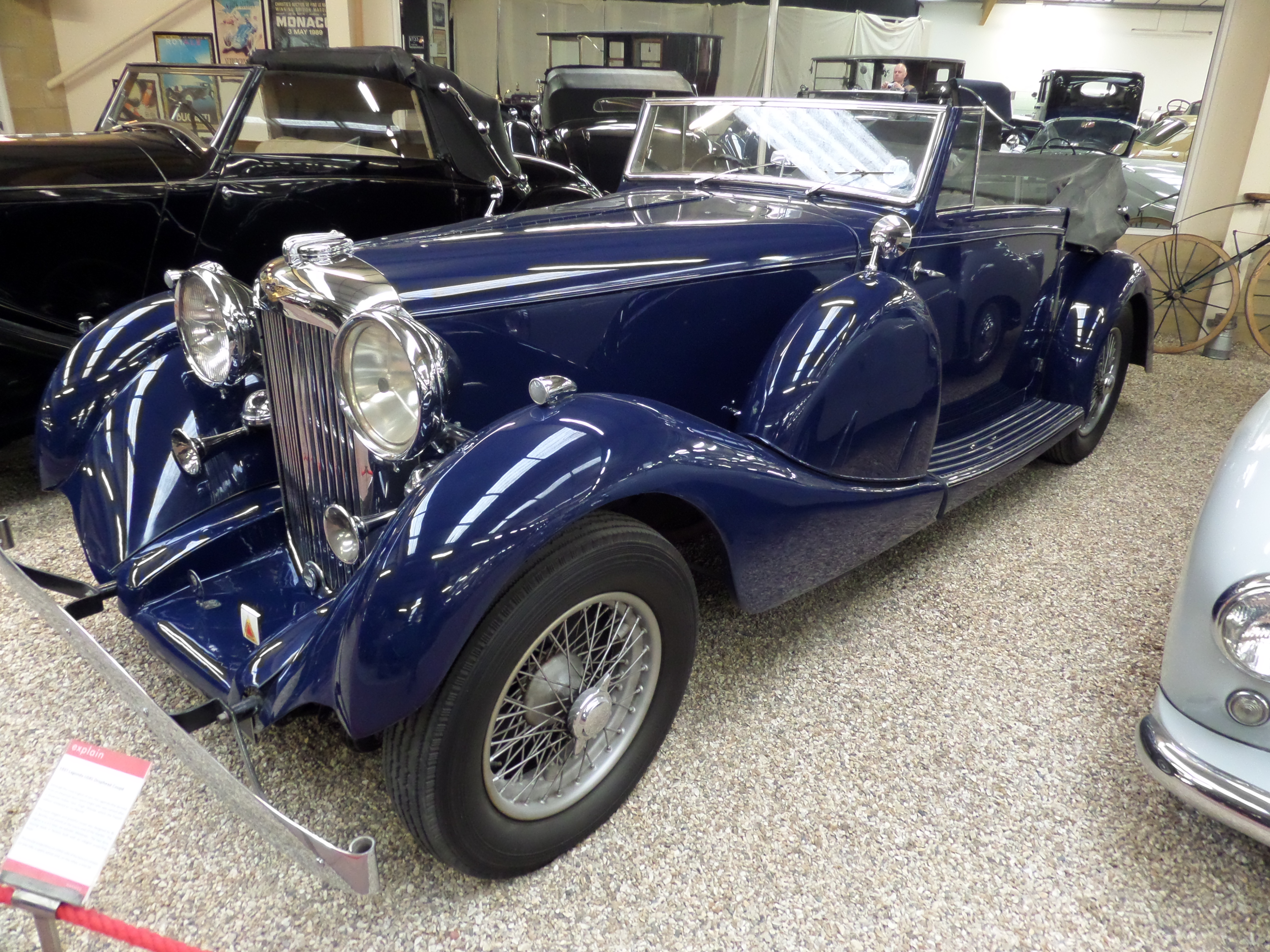
- 1937 Lagonda LG6

Overview
- Manufacturer: Lagonda
- Production: 1937–1940; 85

Body and chassis
- Body style: tourer saloon coupé limousine

Powertrain
- Engine: 4453 cc Meadows I6
- Transmission: 4-speed manual

Dimensions
- Wheelbase: 127 in (3,226 mm); 135 in (3,429 mm)
- Length: 198 in (5,029 mm)
- Width: 72 in (1,829 mm)

Chronology
- Predecessor: Lagonda LG45

The Lagonda LG6 is a large car produced by the British Lagonda company from 1937 until 1940. It was announced at the 1937 London Motor Show.

The LG6 chassis is very similar to the design used on the Lagonda V12, albeit longer by 3.5 in (89 mm) to cater for the longer engine fitted. Suspension is independent torsion bar up front (unlike the LG45's leaf sprung beam axle) and a live rear axle with a spiral bevel gear final drive. The braking system is Lockheed hydraulic, another significant upgrade over the LG45's mechanical brakes.

The 4453 cc Straight-six engine with pushrod operated overhead valves was originally bought in from Henry Meadows of Wolverhampton and was previously used in the M45 and LG45 models. Drive is to the rear wheels through a single dry plate clutch and four-speed gearbox.

Standard coachwork included saloon, tourer, coupé and sedanca styles. The tourer was also available in Rapide version and had a higher compression ratio engine but only two were sold.

The car can be distinguished from the V12 by the twin long trumpet horns on either side of the radiator grille. 67 of the short chassis and 18 long chassis were made.

Only one LG6, chassis number 12341, was sold into the Netherlands, to the architect Jan Frederik van Erven Dorens for 13,200 guilders in 1938. After the Liberation of the Netherlands in 1945, the car was confiscated for use by Field Marshal Bernard Montgomery, who also used it for victory parades in Amsterdam. The car was not returned afterwards but became part of Prince Bernhard's collection. In 2003, Erven Dorens' grandson Robin produced a film titled Lagonda about the car.

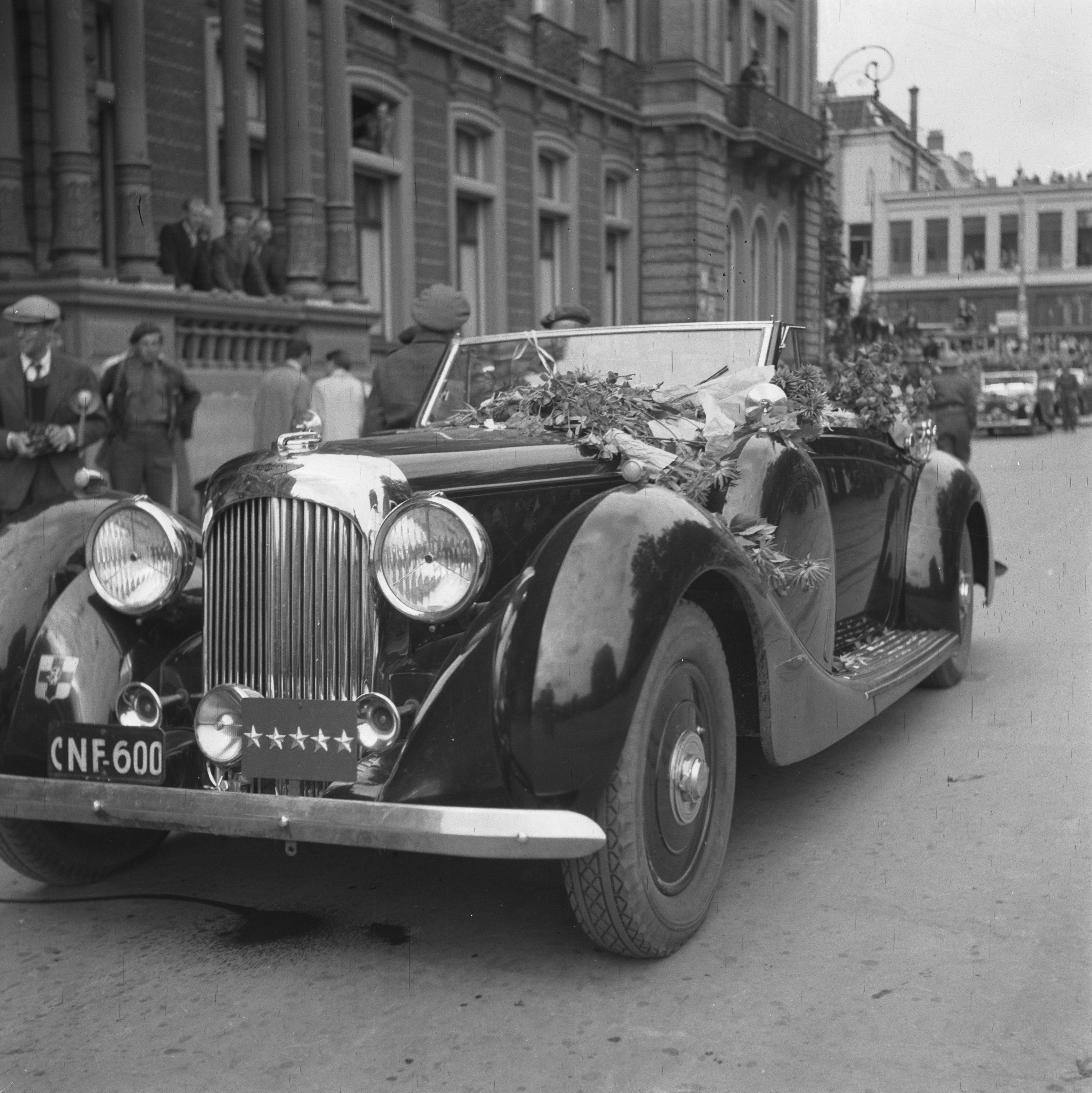
Montgomery's LG6 in Amsterdam

Lagonda LG6 four-door, six-light saloon

1938 Lagonda LG6 (rear)
