= 2000 Trans-Am Series =

American sports car racing competition

Seasons
- ← 1999 2001 →

The 2000 BFGoodrich Tires Trans-Am Series was the 35th season of the Sports Car Club of America's Trans-Am Series. 2000 marked the end of the "American muscle revival" era that had begun in 1989, with Italian manufacturer Qvale winning the championship. It would also mark the rise of Rocketsports Racing's dominance using Jaguar XKRs, which would continue until the series dissolved in 2006, after which team owner Paul Gentilozzi would switch to the American Le Mans Series. The season also marked the final victory for Pontiac in Trans Am, with a win at Texas.

== Teams and drivers ==
Car	No.	Driver	Rounds
Chevrolet Camaro	07	(United States) Marybeth Harrison	4, 6–7, 10
Chevrolet Camaro	0	(New Zealand) Craig Baird	9, 11
Chevrolet Camaro	0	(United States) Alan Ferguson	10, 12
Chevrolet Camaro	6	(United States) Brian Pelke	1, 7
Chevrolet Camaro	6	(United States) Frank Cioppettini	3
Chevrolet Camaro	6	(United States) Willy T. Ribbs	4
Chevrolet Camaro	6	(United States) G.J. Mennen, Jr.	11
Chevrolet Camaro	6	(United States) Linda Pobst	12
Chevrolet Camaro	8	(United States) John Paul Jr.	5
Chevrolet Camaro	10	(United States) Don Sak	4–12
Chevrolet Camaro	16	(United States) Willy T. Ribbs	1–3, 5–12
Chevrolet Camaro	16	(United States) Bobby Sak	4
Chevrolet Camaro	18	(United States) Jon Leavy	1–2
Chevrolet Camaro	20	(United States) Tony Ave	5–7
Chevrolet Camaro	22	(United States) Ken Murillo	3, 5, 10–11
Chevrolet Camaro	24	(United States) Jim Briody	1–3, 5–12
Chevrolet Camaro	25	(United States) Eric Curran	4
Chevrolet Camaro	31	(United States) Don Meluzio	1, 4, 6–7
Chevrolet Camaro	35	(Puerto Rico) Mandy Gonzalez	1
Chevrolet Camaro	38	(United States) Kerry Alexander	All
Chevrolet Camaro	39	(United States) J. Craig Shafer	2, 4–6
Chevrolet Camaro	40	(United States) G.J. Mennen, Jr.	1–6, 9
Chevrolet Camaro	40	(Canada) Kenny Wilden	7, 10–12
Chevrolet Camaro	43	(United States) Andre Toennis	1, 9
Chevrolet Camaro	46	(United States) Bill Bentley	1–2
Chevrolet Camaro	50	(United States) Bruce Dewey	1–2
Chevrolet Camaro	55	(United States) Mike Rockett	10
Chevrolet Camaro	58	(United States) Carl Cormier	1
Chevrolet Camaro	59	(United States) Simon Gregg	All
Chevrolet Camaro	62	(United States) Tom Smith	8
Chevrolet Camaro	73	(United States) Chet Williams	2, 4–5
Chevrolet Camaro	76	(United States) Jerry Simmons	2, 4–7, 9, 11
Chevrolet Camaro	78	(United States) Moneca Kolvyn	1, 4, 10–11
Chevrolet Camaro	81	(United States) Kevin Neilson	11–12
Chevrolet Camaro	90	(United States) Jim Maguire	9, 11
Chevrolet Camaro	95	(Canada) Charlie Webster	4
Chevrolet Camaro	98	(United States) Stuart Hayner	All
Chevrolet Corvette	8	(United States) John Paul Jr.	1–4
Chevrolet Corvette	10	(United States) Don Sak	1–3
Chevrolet Corvette	17	(United States) Jerry Kinn	1–6, 8–12
Chevrolet Corvette	23	(United States) Bob Ruman	All
Chevrolet Corvette	27	(United States) Mike Gagliardo	7
Chevrolet Corvette	28	(United States) Lou Gigliotti	All
Chevrolet Corvette	30	(United States) Dan Furey	2, 6
Chevrolet Corvette	37	(United States) Jeff Simunaci	7, 12
Chevrolet Corvette	48	(United States) Jack Willes	1–9
Chevrolet Corvette	64	(United States) Johnny Miller	All
Chevrolet Corvette	82	(United States) Dick Greer	All
Chevrolet Corvette	83	(United States) Max Lagod	7
Chevrolet Corvette	93	(Canada) James Holtom	4, 11
Ford Mustang	08	(United States) Richard La Barera	1–2, 4–7
Ford Mustang	8	(United States) John Paul Jr.	6
Ford Mustang	9	(United States) Gary Johnson	1–9
Ford Mustang	11	(United States) Mike Davis	All
Ford Mustang	12	(United States) Michael Lewis	All
Ford Mustang	12	(United States) Boris Said	1
Ford Mustang	14	(United States) John Malacuso	1–5, 7
Ford Mustang	15	(United States) Tomy Drissi	All
Ford Mustang	19	(United States) Steve Pelke	All
Ford Mustang	26	(Argentina) Claudio Burtin	3, 5–7, 9–12
Ford Mustang	33	(United States) Boris Said	8, 10–12
Ford Mustang	42	(Dominican Republic) Juan Carlos Leroux	11–12
Ford Mustang	47	(United States) Tom Miller	6, 10–11
Ford Mustang	47	(United States) Don Soenen	7
Ford Mustang	48	(United States) Jack Willes	11–12
Ford Mustang	60	(United States) Grant Sylvester	9–12
Ford Mustang	70	(United States) Peter Shea	1–3, 5–7, 10–12
Ford Mustang	74	(United States) Don Soenen	10
Ford Mustang	75	(United States) Tim Cowen	2, 6–7
Ford Mustang	77	(United States) Paul Fix	7
Ford Mustang	81	(United States) Kevil Neilson	10
Ford Mustang	84	(United States) Chris Neville	All
Jaguar XKR	1	(United States) Paul Gentilozzi	All
Jaguar XKR	5	(United States) Jeff Altenburg	All
Jaguar XKR	68	(Canada) Peter Klutt	7
Pontiac Grand Prix	66	(United States) Leighton Reese	All
Oldsmobile Aurora	49	(United States) Randy Ruhlman	All
Oldsmobile Cutlass	13	(United States) David C. Seuss	2–3, 5–9, 12
Qvale Mangusta	44	(United States) Bruce Qvale	5–7, 11–12
Qvale Mangusta	88	(United States) Brian Simo	All

== Results ==
Round	Date	Circuit	Winning driver	Car
1	17 March	(United States) Sebring	(United States) Brian Simo	Qvale Mangusta
2	1 April	(United States) Charlotte	(United States) Brian Simo	Qvale Mangusta
3	16 April	(United States) Long Beach	(United States) Tomy Drissi	Ford Mustang
4	21 May	(Canada) Mosport	(United States) Brian Simo	Qvale Mangusta
5	17 June	(United States) Detroit	(United States) Paul Gentilozzi	Jaguar XKR
6	1 July	(United States) Cleveland	(United States) Paul Gentilozzi	Jaguar XKR
7	19 August	(United States) Road America	(United States) Paul Gentilozzi	Jaguar XKR
8	3 September	(United States) Texas	(United States) Leighton Reese	Pontiac Grand Prix
9	30 September	(United States) Houston	(United States) Chris Neville	Ford Mustang
10	15 October	(United States) Laguna Seca	(Canada) Kenny Wilden	Chevrolet Camaro
11	29 October	(United States) Las Vegas	(United States) Boris Said	Ford Mustang
12	5 November	(United States) San Diego	(United States) Johnny Miller	Chevrolet Corvette

== Championship standings ==
Race Position	1	2	3	4	5	6	7	8	9	10	11	12	13	14	15	16	17	18	19	20	21	22	23	24	25
Points	30	27	25	23	21	20	19	18	17	16	15	14	13	12	11	10	9	8	7	6	5	4	3	2	1

=== Drivers ===
Pos.	Driver	Car	SEB (United States)	CLT (United States)	LBH (United States)	MOS (Canada)	DET (United States)	CLE (United States)	ELK (United States)	TEX (United States)	HOU (United States)	LAG (United States)	LVS (United States)	SAN (United States)	Points
1	(United States) Brian Simo	Qvale Mangusta	1	1	7	1	2	3	20	21	4	29	14	3	261
2	(United States) Paul Gentilozzi	Jaguar XKR	4	2	14	7	1	1	1	23	6	3	30	29	249
3	(United States) Jeff Altenburg	Jaguar XKR	3	31	24	2	7	4	2	3	13	8	5	18	197
4	(United States) Leighton Reese	Pontiac Grand Prix	15	9	28	33	10	9	4	1	5	10	10	7	190
5	(United States) Chris Neville	Ford Mustang	2	4	16	12	22	7	DSQ	18	1	14	20	4	180
6	(United States) Tomy Drissi	Ford Mustang	21	5	1	3	31	21	6	7	16	25	8	12	170
7	(United States) Willy T. Ribbs	Ford Mustang	6	26	2	13	3	31	34	DNQ	29	7	4	5	153
8	(United States) Johnny Miller	Chevrolet Corvette	16	34	15	9	35	2	33	2	27	5	31	1	152
9	(United States) Jack Willes	Chevrolet Corvette	33	3	23	6	5	32	26	20	7				142
9	(United States) Jack Willes	Ford Mustang											3	8	142
10	(United States) Simon Gregg	Chevrolet Corvette	24	14	8	16	15	33	9	4	19	11	17	13	137
11	(United States) Lou Gigliotti	Chevrolet Corvette	5	6	19	4	9	5	35	24	24	6	33	25	135
11	(United States) Steve Pelke	Ford Mustang	17	12	5	11	28	16	12	17	22	16	13	10	135
13	(United States) Bob Ruman	Chevrolet Corvette	7	11	3	32	26	10	10	16	9	31	16	23	131
14	(United States) Randy Ruhlman	Oldsmobile Aurora	23	8	18	8	6	29	25	22	8	9	27	22	118
14	(United States) Mike Davis	Ford Mustang	12	27	10	28	12	13	31	9	10	15	29	9	118
16	(United States) Stuart Hayner	Chevrolet Camaro	27	24	29	5	36	8	30	25	2	4	7	27	116
17	(United States) G.J. Mennen, Jr.	Chevrolet Camaro	26	7	30	10	4	18			3		6		111
18	(United States) Michael Lewis	Ford Mustang	11	30	26	25	8	35	5	5	18	33	9	32	104
19	(United States) Boris Said	Ford Mustang	DNS							19		2	1	2	92
20	(United States) Don Sak	Chevrolet Camaro	28	29	20	14	27	12	11	10	31	24	11	16	90
21	(United States) Peter Shea	Ford Mustang	19	22	6		14	36	39			12	23	11	75
22	(United States) Gary Johnson	Ford Mustang	9	23	12	18	30	15	22	12	23				74
23	(United States) Kerry Alexander	Chevrolet Camaro	22	25	27	31	11	11	8	6	28	28	32	31	73
24	(United States) Jim Briody	Chevrolet Camaro	13	15	31		16	30	23	13	26	22	21	17	68
25	(United States) Jerry Kinn	Chevrolet Corvette	29	13	22	27	29	DNS		8	12	19	18	24	66
26	(United States) David C. Seuss	Oldsmobile Cutlass		19	13		32	27	16	14	15			21	58
27	(Canada) Kenny Wilden	Chevrolet Camaro							36			1	24	6	57
28	(Argentina) Claudio Burtin	Ford Mustang			4		21	28	21		11	21	34	30	53
29	(United States) Don Meluzio	Chevrolet Camaro	8			15		14	27						41
30	(United States) Bruce Qvale	Qvale Mangusta					33	6	7				DNQ	33	39
30	(United States) Dick Greer	Chevrolet Corvette	34	DNQ	21	24	37	24	14	15	25	27	26	20	39
32	(United States) Tony Ave	Chevrolet Camaro					34	17	3						34
33	(New Zealand) Craig Baird	Chevrolet Camaro									20		2		33
33	(United States) Ken Murillo	Chevrolet Camaro			9		17					30	19		33
35	(United States) Grant Silvester	Ford Mustang									14	23	12	26	29
36	(United States) Marybeth Harrison	Chevrolet Camaro				20		34	19			13			26
36	(United States) Jerry Simmons	Chevrolet Camaro		17		DNQ	25	23	18		21		35		26
38	(United States) Tim Cowen	Ford Mustang		18				20	15						24
39	(Dominican Republic) Juan Carlos Leroux	Ford Mustang											15	15	22
Pos.	Driver	Car	SEB (United States)	CLT (United States)	LBH (United States)	MOS (Canada)	DET (United States)	CLE (United States)	ELK (United States)	TEX (United States)	HOU (United States)	LAG (United States)	LVS (United States)	SAN (United States)	Points

Colour	Result
Gold	Winner
Silver	Second place
Bronze	Third place
Green	Points classification
Blue	Non-points classification
Blue	Non-classified finish (NC)
Purple	Retired, not classified (Ret)
Red	Did not qualify (DNQ)
Red	Did not pre-qualify (DNPQ)
Black	Disqualified (DSQ)
White	Did not start (DNS)
White	Withdrew (WD)
White	Race cancelled (C)
Blank	Did not practice (DNP)
Blank	Did not arrive (DNA)
Blank	Excluded (EX)
