= List of Trans-Am Series marques =

This list, assembled from Sports Car Club of America box scores, contains all vehicle marques that competed in the Trans-Am Series. The list is sorted first by era, and then by country. American marques from the Golden Age onward are divided among the Big Three.

== Early Days ==
=== United States ===
==== General Motors ====
- Chevrolet Camaro 1967-72
- Chevrolet Corvair 1966
- Pontiac Tempest 1966

==== Ford ====
- Ford Mustang 1966-72
- Ford Falcon 1966
- Mercury Cougar 1967-1970

==== Chrysler ====
- Plymouth Barracuda 1966-70
- Dodge Challenger 1970-71
- Dodge Dart 1966-70

==== American Motors ====
- Rambler American 1967-1968

=== United Kingdom ===
- Lotus Cortina 1966-72
- Ford Anglia 1967
- Morris Cooper S 1966-72
- Sunbeam Imp 1966-67

=== Germany ===
- Porsche 911 1967-69
- BMW New Class 1966-72
- Opel Kadett 1966 & 1972
- Volkswagen Beetle 1966-67 & 1972
- NSU Prinz 1966-70

=== Italy ===
- Alfa Romeo GTA 1966-72
- Lancia Fulvia 1967-68
- Fiat-Abarth 1000 1966-72

=== Sweden ===
- Saab 96 1966
- Saab 850 1966
- Volvo 122 1966-70

=== Japan ===
- Honda 600 1966
- Hino Contessa 1966

=== France ===
- Simca 1000 1966
- Renault Dauphine 1966 & 1970

== Golden Era ==
=== Over Two Liter ===
==== General Motors ====
- Chevrolet Camaro 1967-72
- Pontiac Firebird 1968-72
- Chevrolet Nova 1970

==== Ford Motor Company ====
- Ford Mustang 1966-72
- Mercury Cougar 1967-70

==== Chrysler Corporation ====
- Dodge Challenger 1970-1971
- Plymouth Barracuda 1966-70
- Dodge Dart 1966-70

==== American Motors ====
- AMC Javelin 1968-72
- Rambler American 1967-1968

=== Under Two Liter ===
==== United Kingdom ====
- Lotus Cortina 1966-72
- Morris Cooper 1966-72
- Ford Escort 1970-72
- Triumph Vitesse 1971

==== Germany ====
- Porsche 911 1967-69
- BMW New Class 1966-72
- Opel Kadett 1966 & 1972
- Volkswagen Beetle 1966-67 & 1972
- NSU Prinz 1966-70

==== Italy ====
- Alfa Romeo GTA 1966-72
- Lancia Fulvia 1967-68
- Fiat-Abarth 1000 1966-72
- Fiat 124 1972
- Alfa Romeo GTV 1970

==== Sweden ====
- Volvo 122 1966-70
- Saab 96 1968
- Volvo PV544 1970
- Volvo 142 1971-72

==== Japan ====
- Datsun 510 1970-72
- Toyota 1600 1972

==== United States ====
- Ford Pinto 1971-72
- Ford Capri 1972

==== France ====
- Renault Dauphine 1966 & 1970
- Renault R8 1968

== 1973-79 ==
=== North America ===
- AMC Hornet
- AMC Javelin
- Chevrolet Camaro
- Chevrolet Corvette C2
- Chevrolet Corvette C3
- Chevrolet Monza
- Ford Capri
- Ford Escort
- Ford Falcon
- Ford Mustang
- Pontiac Firebird
- Shelby Cobra
- Shelby GT350

=== Europe ===
==== Italy ====
- Alfa Romeo Alfetta
- Alfa Romeo GTV
- Alfa Romeo Montreal
- De Tomaso Pantera
- Ferrari 365
- Ferrari Boxer
- Ferrari Dino
- Lancia Stratos

==== Germany ====
- BMW New Class
- Opel Manta
- Porsche 911
- Porsche 914
- Porsche 924
- Porsche 930
- Porsche 934
- Porsche 935
- Porsche Carrera
- Volkswagen Rabbit
- Volkswagen Scirocco

==== Britain ====
- Jaguar E-Type
- Jaguar XJS
- Lotus Europa
- Triumph 2000
- Triumph TR7
- Triumph TR8

==== France ====
- Renault Alpine
- Simca

=== Japan ===
- Datsun 240Z
- Datsun 260Z
- Datsun 280Z
- Datsun 510
- Datsun B210
- Mazda RX-3
- Mazda RX-7
- Toyota Celica

== GT Era ==
=== North America ===
- AMC Concord
- AMC Javelin
- Buick Century (1985)
- Buick Regal (1984-1988)
- Buick Skyhawk (1983-1988)
- Buick Somerset (1985-1988)
- Chevrolet Beretta (1987-1988)
- Chevrolet Camaro (1983-1988)
- Chevrolet Corvette (1983-1988)
- Chevrolet Monte Carlo (1986-1988)
- Chevrolet Monza (1983-1984)
- Dodge Charger
- Dodge Daytona
- Dodge Mirada (1985)
- Ford Capri
- Ford Fairmont (1983)
- Ford Mustang (1983-1988)
- Ford Thunderbird (1983-1988)
- Lincoln Mark VII (1984-1985)
- Mercury Capri (1983-1988)
- Merkur XR4Ti (1986-1988)
- Oldsmobile Calais (1986)
- Oldsmobile Cutlass Supreme (1988)
- Oldsmobile Toronado (1986-1988)
- Plymouth Barracuda
- Plymouth Volare (1983)
- Pontiac Fiero (1984-1987)
- Pontiac Firebird (1983-1988)
- Pontiac Le Mans
- Pontiac Trans Am (1983-1988)

=== Europe ===
- Audi 200 (1988)
- Audi 4000 (1983)
- BMW 633 (eligible but never run)
- BMW M1
- Jaguar XJS (1988)
- Lancia Beta
- Mercedes-Benz 380 SL
- Mercedes-Benz 450 SL
- Porsche 911 (1983-1988)
- Porsche 914
- Porsche 924 (1983-1986)
- Porsche 928 (1983)
- Porsche 930 (1983-1985)
- Porsche 934
- Porsche 935
- Porsche 944 (1986-1988)
- Triumph TR8
- Volkswagen Golf (1985-1986)
- Volkswagen Rabbit (1984-1985)
- Volkswagen Scirocco (1983-1985)

=== Asia ===
- Datsun 240Z
- Datsun 280ZX (1983-1984)
- Mazda RX-7 (1983-1988)
- Nissan 200SX (1985)
- Nissan 300ZX (1984-1988)

== American Muscle Revival Era (1989-2006) ==
Manufacturer	Model	Years active	Cha.
Chrysler Corporation (United States)
Dodge	Avenger		
Dodge	Daytona	1992-1997	
Dodge	Intrepid	2005	
Dodge	Viper	2001-2004	
Ford Motor Company (United States)
Ford	Mustang	1989-2006	
Ford	Taurus	2005	
Ford	Thunderbird		
Mercury	Capri	1989-1990	
General Motors (United States)
Buick	Regal	1989	
Buick	Skylark	1989	
Chevrolet	Beretta	1989-1994	
Chevrolet	Camaro	1989-2006	
Chevrolet	Corvette	1989-2006	
Chevrolet	Lumina	1991-1992	
Chevrolet	Monte Carlo	2004-2005	
Oldsmobile	Aurora	2000	
Oldsmobile	Ciera		
Oldsmobile	Calais		
Oldsmobile	Cutlass Supreme	1989-2000	
Oldsmobile	Intrigue		
Oldsmobile	Oldsmobile Toronado		
Pontiac	Fiero	1989	
Pontiac	Firebird		
Pontiac	Grand Prix	1996-2000	
Pontiac	Trans Am		
Jaguar Cars (United Kingdom)
Jaguar	XKR	2000-2006	
Mazda Motor Corporation (Japan)
Mazda	RX-7	1989, 2006	
Mazda	Miata	2006	
Panoz, LLC (United States)
Panoz	Panoz Esperante	2001-2003	
Porsche AG (Germany)
Porsche	Porsche 944	1989	
Qvale Modena (Italy)
Qvale	Mangusta	2000-2004	

== Return ==
The following vehicles were used since the 2015 season:

=== TA1 ===
- Cadillac CTS-V
- Chevrolet Camaro
- Chevrolet Corvette
- Ford Mustang
- Jaguar XKR

=== TA2 ===
- Chevrolet Camaro
- Dodge Challenger
- Ford Mustang
- Toyota Camry

=== TA3 ===
- Aston Martin GT4
- BMW M3
- Chevrolet Corvette
- Dodge Viper
- Porsche 996
- Porsche 997

=== TA4 ===
- Chevrolet Camaro
- Dodge Challenger
- Ford Mustang
