= Mangusta (disambiguation) =

The De Tomaso Mangusta is an Italian sports car produced between 1967 and 1971.

Mangusta may also refer to:

- Qvale Mangusta, a 1999 sports car
- Agusta A129 Mangusta, attack helicopter
