= 2017 STP 500 =

Race details
- Race 6 of 36 in the 2017 Monster Energy NASCAR Cup Series
- Martinsville Speedway
- Date: April 2, 2017
- Location: Martinsville Speedway in Ridgeway, Virginia
- Course: Permanent racing facility
- Course length: 0.526 miles (0.847 km)
- Distance: 500 laps, 263 mi (423.5 km)
- Average speed: 70.139 miles per hour (112.878 km/h)

Pole position
Driver	Kyle Larson	Chip Ganassi Racing
- Time: N/A

Most laps led
Driver	Kyle Busch	Joe Gibbs Racing
- Laps: 274

Winner
No. 2	Brad Keselowski	Team Penske

Television in the United States
- Network: FS1
- Announcers: Mike Joy, Jeff Gordon and Darrell Waltrip
- Nielsen ratings: 2.1/4 (Overnight)

Radio in the United States
- Radio: MRN
- Booth announcers: Joe Moore, Jeff Striegle and Rusty Wallace
- Turn announcers: Dave Moody (Backstretch)

The 2017 STP 500 was a Monster Energy NASCAR Cup Series race held on April 2, 2017, at Martinsville Speedway in Ridgeway, Virginia. Contested over 500 laps on the .526 mile (.847 km) paperclip-shaped short track, it was sixth race of the 2017 Monster Energy NASCAR Cup Series season.

== Entry list ==
No.	Driver	Team	Manufacturer
1	Jamie McMurray	Chip Ganassi Racing	Chevrolet
2	Brad Keselowski	Team Penske	Ford
3	Austin Dillon	Richard Childress Racing	Chevrolet
4	Kevin Harvick	Stewart–Haas Racing	Ford
5	Kasey Kahne	Hendrick Motorsports	Chevrolet
6	Trevor Bayne	Roush Fenway Racing	Ford
10	Danica Patrick	Stewart–Haas Racing	Ford
11	Denny Hamlin	Joe Gibbs Racing	Toyota
13	Ty Dillon (R)	Germain Racing	Chevrolet
14	Clint Bowyer	Stewart–Haas Racing	Ford
15	Reed Sorenson	Premium Motorsports	Toyota
17	Ricky Stenhouse Jr.	Roush Fenway Racing	Ford
18	Kyle Busch	Joe Gibbs Racing	Toyota
19	Daniel Suárez (R)	Joe Gibbs Racing	Toyota
20	Matt Kenseth	Joe Gibbs Racing	Toyota
21	Ryan Blaney	Wood Brothers Racing	Ford
22	Joey Logano	Team Penske	Ford
23	Gray Gaulding (R)	BK Racing	Toyota
24	Chase Elliott	Hendrick Motorsports	Chevrolet
27	Paul Menard	Richard Childress Racing	Chevrolet
31	Ryan Newman	Richard Childress Racing	Chevrolet
32	Matt DiBenedetto	Go Fas Racing	Ford
33	Jeffrey Earnhardt	Circle Sport – The Motorsports Group	Chevrolet
34	Landon Cassill	Front Row Motorsports	Ford
37	Chris Buescher	JTG Daugherty Racing	Chevrolet
38	David Ragan	Front Row Motorsports	Ford
41	Kurt Busch	Stewart–Haas Racing	Ford
42	Kyle Larson	Chip Ganassi Racing	Chevrolet
43	Aric Almirola	Richard Petty Motorsports	Ford
47	A. J. Allmendinger	JTG Daugherty Racing	Chevrolet
48	Jimmie Johnson	Hendrick Motorsports	Chevrolet
51	Timmy Hill (i)	Rick Ware Racing	Chevrolet
72	Cole Whitt	Tri-Star Motorsports	Chevrolet
77	Erik Jones (R)	Furniture Row Racing	Toyota
78	Martin Truex Jr.	Furniture Row Racing	Toyota
83	Corey LaJoie (R)	BK Racing	Toyota
88	Dale Earnhardt Jr.	Hendrick Motorsports	Chevrolet
95	Michael McDowell	Leavine Family Racing	Chevrolet
Official entry list

== Practice ==
=== First practice ===
Denny Hamlin was the fastest in the first practice session with a time of 19.879 seconds and a speed of 95.256 mph (153.300 km/h).

Pos	No.	Driver	Team	Manufacturer	Time	Speed
1	11	Denny Hamlin	Joe Gibbs Racing	Toyota	19.879	95.256
2	18	Kyle Busch	Joe Gibbs Racing	Toyota	19.920	95.060
3	42	Kyle Larson	Chip Ganassi Racing	Chevrolet	19.939	94.970
Official first practice results

=== Second practice ===
Brad Keselowski was the fastest in the second practice session with a time of 20.058 seconds and a speed of 94.406 mph (151.932 km/h).

Pos	No.	Driver	Team	Manufacturer	Time	Speed
1	2	Brad Keselowski	Team Penske	Ford	20.058	94.406
2	31	Ryan Newman	Richard Childress Racing	Chevrolet	20.125	94.092
3	78	Martin Truex Jr.	Furniture Row Racing	Toyota	20.180	93.836
Official second practice results

=== Final practice ===
Clint Bowyer was the fastest in the final practice session with a time of 20.174 seconds and a speed of 93.863 mph (151.058 km/h).

Pos	No.	Driver	Team	Manufacturer	Time	Speed
1	14	Clint Bowyer	Stewart–Haas Racing	Ford	20.174	93.863
2	18	Kyle Busch	Joe Gibbs Racing	Toyota	20.238	93.567
3	1	Jamie McMurray	Chip Ganassi Racing	Chevrolet	20.246	93.530
Official final practice results

== Qualifying ==
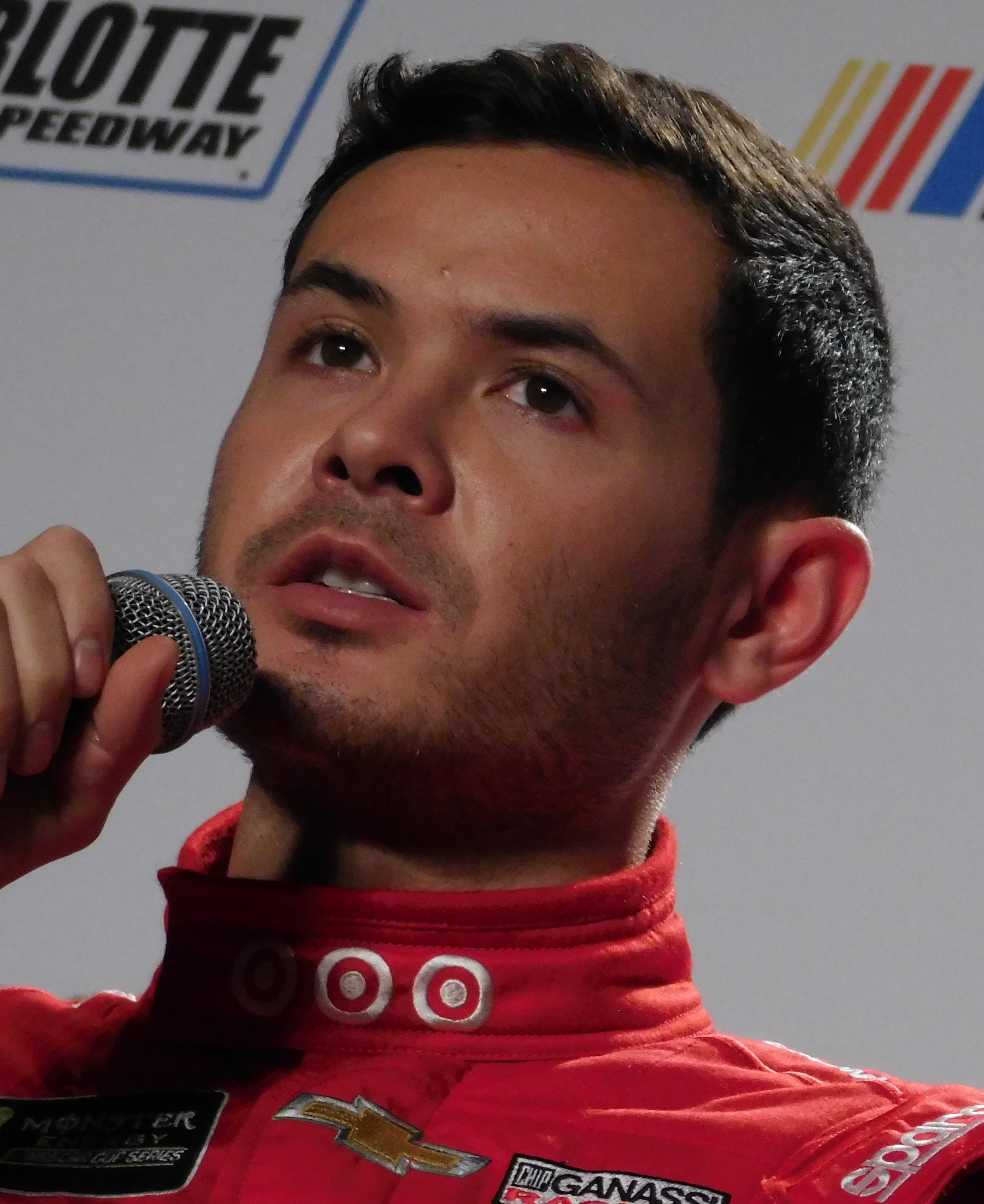
Kyle Larson won the pole.

Qualifying for Friday was cancelled due to rain and Kyle Larson, the point leader, was awarded the pole as a result.

=== Starting Lineup ===
Pos	No.	Driver	Team	Manufacturer
1	42	Kyle Larson	Chip Ganassi Racing	Chevrolet
2	24	Chase Elliott	Hendrick Motorsports	Chevrolet
3	78	Martin Truex Jr.	Furniture Row Racing	Toyota
4	2	Brad Keselowski	Team Penske	Ford
5	22	Joey Logano	Team Penske	Ford
6	1	Jamie McMurray	Chip Ganassi Racing	Chevrolet
7	21	Ryan Blaney	Wood Brothers Racing	Ford
8	14	Clint Bowyer	Stewart–Haas Racing	Ford
9	4	Kevin Harvick	Stewart–Haas Racing	Ford
10	18	Kyle Busch	Joe Gibbs Racing	Toyota
11	31	Ryan Newman	Richard Childress Racing	Chevrolet
12	11	Denny Hamlin	Joe Gibbs Racing	Toyota
13	5	Kasey Kahne	Hendrick Motorsports	Chevrolet
14	41	Kurt Busch	Stewart–Haas Racing	Ford
15	77	Erik Jones (R)	Furniture Row Racing	Toyota
16	6	Trevor Bayne	Roush Fenway Racing	Ford
17	48	Jimmie Johnson	Hendrick Motorsports	Chevrolet
18	43	Aric Almirola	Richard Petty Motorsports	Ford
19	19	Daniel Suárez (R)	Joe Gibbs Racing	Toyota
20	3	Austin Dillon	Richard Childress Racing	Chevrolet
21	88	Dale Earnhardt Jr.	Hendrick Motorsports	Chevrolet
22	27	Paul Menard	Richard Childress Racing	Chevrolet
23	13	Ty Dillon (R)	Germain Racing	Chevrolet
24	17	Ricky Stenhouse Jr.	Roush Fenway Racing	Ford
25	20	Matt Kenseth	Joe Gibbs Racing	Toyota
26	95	Michael McDowell	Leavine Family Racing	Chevrolet
27	34	Landon Cassill	Front Row Motorsports	Ford
28	32	Matt DiBenedetto	Go Fas Racing	Ford
29	10	Danica Patrick	Stewart–Haas Racing	Ford
30	47	A. J. Allmendinger	JTG Daugherty Racing	Chevrolet
31	72	Cole Whitt	Tri-Star Motorsports	Chevrolet
32	15	Reed Sorenson	Premium Motorsports	Chevrolet
33	37	Chris Buescher	JTG Daugherty Racing	Chevrolet
34	38	David Ragan	Front Row Motorsports	Ford
35	83	Corey LaJoie (R)	BK Racing	Toyota
36	33	Jeffrey Earnhardt	Circle Sport – The Motorsports Group	Chevrolet
37	23	Gray Gaulding (R)	BK Racing	Toyota
38	51	Timmy Hill (i)	Rick Ware Racing	Chevrolet
Official starting lineup

== Race ==
=== First stage ===
Kyle Larson led the field to the green flag at 2:18 p.m. He led the first 24 laps before giving way to Brad Keselowski on lap 25. The first caution flew on lap 69 when Ricky Stenhouse Jr. spun out in Turn 3. Trevor Bayne, Keselowski, Michael McDowell (speeding) and Joey Logano (crew member over the wall too soon) restarted the race from the tail-end of the field. Earnhardt said after the race that based on "what I see on my dash I wasn’t speeding, but (NASCAR) has better technology than we do. They said it was in the segment out of my pit box. Hell, I must have got out of there pretty damn good. I don’t know what to do about that." As a result of Keselowski's penalty, Martin Truex Jr., who was running second at the time, assumed the lead.

The race restarted on lap 76. Denny Hamlin passed Truex for the lead on lap 89. Jamie McMurray made contact with Jimmie Johnson on lap 100 and developed a left-rear tire rub that cut down the tire, led to him spinning out and hitting the Turn 3 wall on lap 106, bringing out the second caution. McMurray went on to finish last.

The race restarted on lap 117. The third caution flew on lap 123 when Dale Earnhardt Jr. got loose exiting Turn 2, and received help from Ryan Blaney, and spun out on the backstretch.

The race restarted on lap 127. Truex won the first stage and the fourth caution flew for the conclusion of the stage. Kyle Busch exited pit road with the race lead.

=== Second stage ===
The race restarted on lap 141. Chase Elliott took the lead from Busch on lap 145, only for Busch to pass under Elliott in Turn 2 to retake it on lap 152. Logano made an unscheduled stop for a flat left-rear tire on lap 230. In the closing laps of the stage, Busch drove to the outside of Stenhouse going into Turn 3 on lap 257 when Stenhouse made contact with him to try and stay on the lead lap. On the last lap of the stage, Stenhouse bumped Busch out of the groove, allowing Elliott to pass Busch for the lead and win the second stage, as the fifth caution flew on lap 260 for the conclusion of the stage. Busch was asked after the race if what Stenhouse did was fair, and he said it is "if you expect it back. I actually was rolling into Turn 3 and was kind of going higher out of my way in order to let the 17 [of Stenhouse] back by and give him the lap. That was my intent, and then he just drove through me. It cost me my spot to the 24 [of Chase Elliott], so I was hoping that I could run off the corner side by side with the 17 and keep the 24 at bay and just keep my nose in front of his and be able to score the segment, and I was trying to be a nice guy, but nice guys don't finish first."

=== Final stage ===
The race restarted on lap 272 and Busch took back the lead. Debris in Turn 2 brought out the sixth caution on lap 278.

The race restarted on lap 284. Exiting Turn 4 on lap 287, Erik Jones made contact with the outside wall, came down across the nose of Austin Dillon going into Turn 1 and got nudged out of the groove. Hamlin got into Dillon and turned him, and the domino effect resulted in heavy damage to the cars of Kurt Busch and Daniel Suárez. This brought out the seventh caution.

The race restarted with 206 laps to go and the eighth caution flew a lap later when Busch's damaged 41 car blew a left-front tire and slammed the wall in Turn 3.

The race restarted with 198 to go. The ninth caution flew with 192 to go when Gray Gaulding spun out in Turn 3.

The race restarted with 187 to go. The 10th caution flew with 167 to go when Reed Sorenson spun out in Turn 3. Hamlin and Stenhouse stayed out to assume the race lead. Kasey Kahne restarted the race from the tail-end of the field for speeding on pit road.

The race restarted with 160 to go and Kyle Busch took the lead back with ease on the restart. The 11th caution flew with 109 to go when Jeffrey Earnhardt blew a right-front tire and slammed the wall exiting Turn 2. Aric Almirola, Bayne and Earnhardt restarted the race from the tail-end of the field for speeding.

The race restarted with 101 to go. Keselowski retook the lead with 94 to go just as Matt DiBenedetto spun out in Turn 3, bringing out the 12th caution.

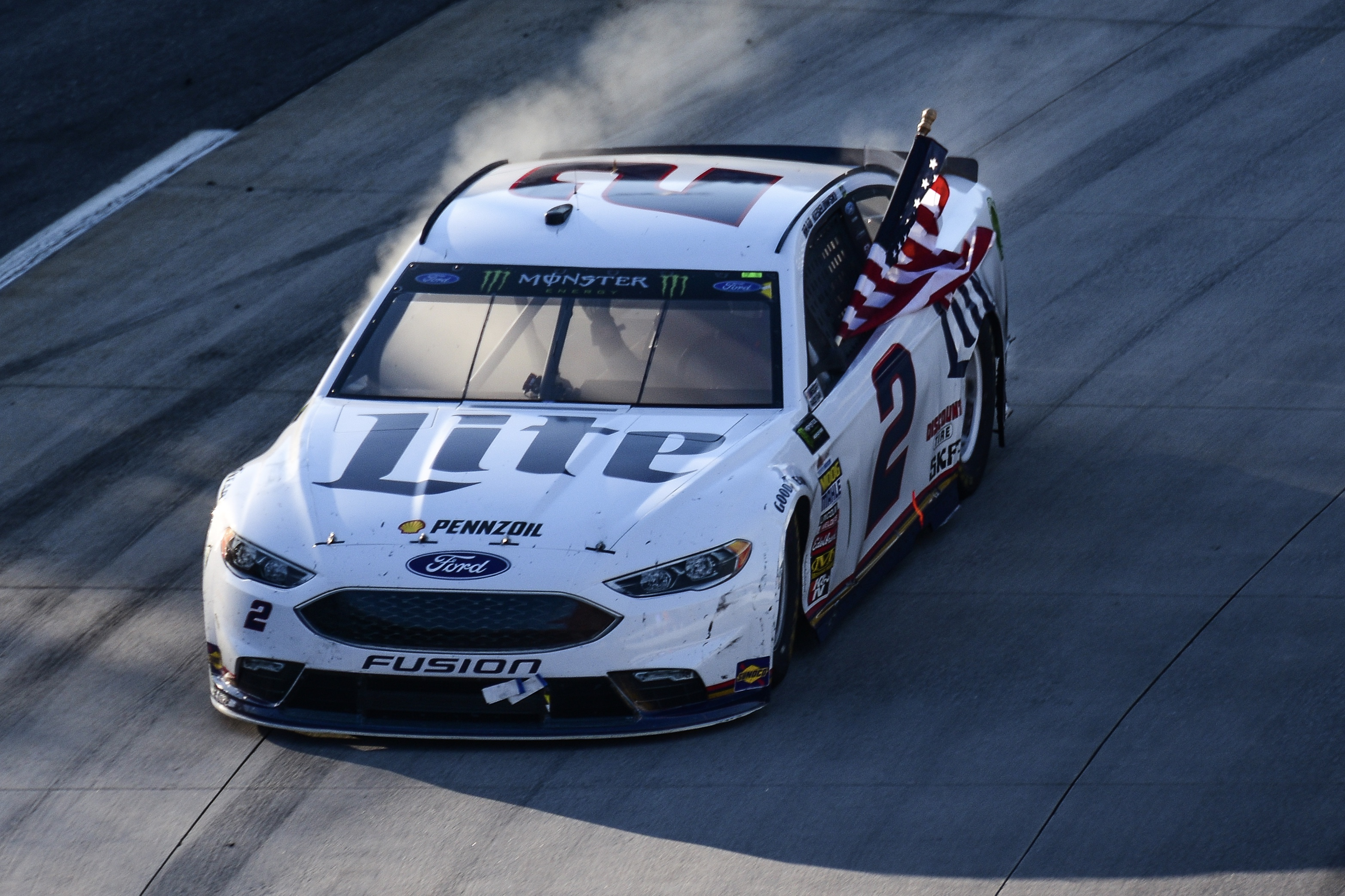
Brad Keselowski celebrates his win in the 2017 STP 500.

The race restarted with 86 to go and Busch powered by Keselowski on the outside lane exiting Turn 2 to take the lead. The next lap, Hamlin got loose and made contact with Danica Patrick and sent her spinning. The resulting domino effect led to Bayne pushing Hamlin into the wall and Earnhardt slamming into the back of teammate Kahne, puncturing his radiator. Earnhardt said the cars ahead of him "just stopped and I couldn't. I got into the back of (Kahne). His bumper knocked the top of the radiator off of it, knocked the fitting off the top of the radiator. We don't have much of a bumper on there to begin with keeping the cars as light as we can and that is about the second or third time I've knocked the top off the radiator here. I wish they were a little tougher than that, so we could beat and bang and keep going." This brought out the 13th caution.

The race restarted with 74 to go. The 14th caution flew with 69 to go for Truex spinning in Turn 4.

The race restarted with 64 to go and Keselowski regained the lead. Busch took it back with 56 to go. For the next 14 laps, Keselowski kept to the rear bumper of the 18 car, took the lead going into Turn 1 with 42 to go and drove on to score the victory.

== Post-race ==
=== Driver comments ===
"This is awesome," Keselowski said in victory lane. "We've ran so good here with the Miller Lite Ford, but something always happens and we haven't been able to bring it home. Martinsville is just one of those champion’s tracks. The guys that run well everywhere run well here, and it's really just an honor to win here and get to compete here. This track is 70 years old and a lot of legends have won here. It feels great to be able to join them and bring home a clock."

"All we did was put four tires on it and it went to junk," Busch said after leading a race high of 274 laps. "I hate it for our guys. They've deserved all year much better finishes than what we’ve been able to produce and here's another one today."

Elliott, who finished third, said he was "proud of our improvements this weekend. I hope that it wasn’t just a fluke deal and we didn’t just get lucky today and run good. I really hope that we’ve found something or I have found something at this track that will lend some more consistent finishes that are further towards the front."

Dillon, who rallied from a multi-car wreck in the middle of the race to finish fifth, said of the final run he "thought we were going to have a little something for the two leaders, but in middle of the run, our car just lacked a little bit more turn and forward drive," Dillon said. "Then at the end we could come back to them again. I think I was running the 22 (fourth-place finisher Joey Logano) back down there at the end. Just proud of my guys and thankful for this run – we needed it."

== Race results ==
=== Stage results ===
Stage 1 Laps: 130

Pos	No	Driver	Team	Manufacturer	Points
1	78	Martin Truex Jr.	Furniture Row Racing	Toyota	10
2	11	Denny Hamlin	Joe Gibbs Racing	Toyota	9
3	18	Kyle Busch	Joe Gibbs Racing	Toyota	8
4	2	Brad Keselowski	Team Penske	Ford	7
5	24	Chase Elliott	Hendrick Motorsports	Chevrolet	6
6	42	Kyle Larson	Chip Ganassi Racing	Chevrolet	5
7	21	Ryan Blaney	Wood Brothers Racing	Ford	4
8	48	Jimmie Johnson	Hendrick Motorsports	Chevrolet	3
9	3	Austin Dillon	Richard Childress Racing	Chevrolet	2
10	14	Clint Bowyer	Stewart–Haas Racing	Ford	1
Official stage one results

Stage 2 Laps: 130

Pos	No	Driver	Team	Manufacturer	Points
1	24	Chase Elliott	Hendrick Motorsports	Chevrolet	10
2	18	Kyle Busch	Joe Gibbs Racing	Toyota	9
3	2	Brad Keselowski	Team Penske	Ford	8
4	48	Jimmie Johnson	Hendrick Motorsports	Chevrolet	7
5	21	Ryan Blaney	Wood Brothers Racing	Ford	6
6	88	Dale Earnhardt Jr.	Hendrick Motorsports	Chevrolet	5
7	20	Matt Kenseth	Joe Gibbs Racing	Toyota	4
8	77	Erik Jones (R)	Furniture Row Racing	Toyota	3
9	6	Trevor Bayne	Roush Fenway Racing	Ford	2
10	5	Kasey Kahne	Hendrick Motorsports	Chevrolet	1
Official stage two results

=== Final stage results ===
Stage 3 Laps: 240

Pos	No	Driver	Team	Manufacturer	Laps	Points
1	2	Brad Keselowski	Team Penske	Ford	500	55
2	18	Kyle Busch	Joe Gibbs Racing	Toyota	500	52
3	24	Chase Elliott	Hendrick Motorsports	Chevrolet	500	50
4	22	Joey Logano	Team Penske	Ford	500	33
5	3	Austin Dillon	Richard Childress Racing	Chevrolet	500	34
6	47	A. J. Allmendinger	JTG Daugherty Racing	Chevrolet	500	31
7	14	Clint Bowyer	Stewart–Haas Racing	Ford	500	31
8	31	Ryan Newman	Richard Childress Racing	Chevrolet	500	29
9	20	Matt Kenseth	Joe Gibbs Racing	Toyota	500	32
10	17	Ricky Stenhouse Jr.	Roush Fenway Racing	Ford	500	27
11	37	Chris Buescher	JTG Daugherty Racing	Chevrolet	500	26
12	77	Erik Jones (R)	Furniture Row Racing	Toyota	500	28
13	6	Trevor Bayne	Roush Fenway Racing	Ford	500	26
14	5	Kasey Kahne	Hendrick Motorsports	Chevrolet	500	24
15	48	Jimmie Johnson	Hendrick Motorsports	Chevrolet	500	32
16	78	Martin Truex Jr.	Furniture Row Racing	Toyota	500	31
17	42	Kyle Larson	Chip Ganassi Racing	Chevrolet	500	25
18	43	Aric Almirola	Richard Petty Motorsports	Ford	500	19
19	27	Paul Menard	Richard Childress Racing	Chevrolet	500	18
20	4	Kevin Harvick	Stewart–Haas Racing	Ford	500	17
21	72	Cole Whitt	TriStar Motorsports	Chevrolet	499	16
22	13	Ty Dillon (R)	Germain Racing	Chevrolet	499	15
23	10	Danica Patrick	Stewart–Haas Racing	Ford	499	14
24	38	David Ragan	Front Row Motorsports	Ford	498	13
25	21	Ryan Blaney	Wood Brothers Racing	Ford	498	22
26	95	Michael McDowell	Leavine Family Racing	Chevrolet	497	11
27	34	Landon Cassill	Front Row Motorsports	Ford	497	10
28	83	Corey LaJoie (R)	BK Racing	Toyota	496	9
29	23	Gray Gaulding (R)	BK Racing	Toyota	495	8
30	11	Denny Hamlin	Joe Gibbs Racing	Toyota	493	16
31	15	Reed Sorenson	Premium Motorsports	Chevrolet	492	6
32	19	Daniel Suárez (R)	Joe Gibbs Racing	Toyota	489	5
33	51	Timmy Hill (i)	Rick Ware Racing	Chevrolet	486	0
34	88	Dale Earnhardt Jr.	Hendrick Motorsports	Chevrolet	418	8
35	32	Matt DiBenedetto	Fas Lane Racing	Ford	401	2
36	33	Jeffrey Earnhardt	Circle Sport – The Motorsports Group	Chevrolet	385	1
37	41	Kurt Busch	Stewart–Haas Racing	Ford	295	1
38	1	Jamie McMurray	Chip Ganassi Racing	Chevrolet	105	1
Official race results

=== Race statistics ===
- Lead changes: 7 among different drivers
- Cautions/Laps: 14 for 95
- Red flags: 0
- Time of race: 3 hours, 44 minutes and 59 seconds
- Average speed: 70.139 miles per hour (112.878 km/h)

== Media ==
=== Television ===
Fox Sports was covering their 17th race at the Martinsville Speedway. Mike Joy, nine-time Martinsville winner Jeff Gordon and 11-time Martinsville winner Darrell Waltrip called in the booth for the race. Jamie Little, Chris Neville and Matt Yocum handled pit road duties for the entire race.

FS1
Booth announcers	Pit reporters
Lap-by-lap: Mike Joy; Color-commentator: Jeff Gordon; Color commentator: Darrell Waltrip	Jamie Little; Chris Neville; Matt Yocum

=== Radio ===
MRN had the radio call for the race which would also be simulcasted on Sirius XM NASCAR Radio. Joe Moore, Jeff Striegle and seven-time Martinsville winner Rusty Wallace called the race in the booth as the cars were on the frontstretch. Dave Moody called the race from atop the turn 3 stands as the field is racing down the backstretch. Alex Hayden, Winston Kelley and Steve Post worked pit road for the radio side.

MRN
Booth announcers	Turn announcers	Pit reporters
Lead announcer: Joe Moore; Announcer: Jeff Striegle; Announcer: Rusty Wallace	Backstretch: Dave Moody	Alex Hayden; Winston Kelley; Steve Post

== Standings after the race ==
Drivers' Championship standings

	Pos	Driver	Points
	1	Kyle Larson	268
	2	Chase Elliott	264 (–4)
	3	Martin Truex Jr.	236 (–12)
	4	Brad Keselowski	234 (–14)
	5	Joey Logano	207 (–61)
4	6	Kyle Busch	188 (–80)
	7	Ryan Blaney	179 (–89)
	8	Clint Bowyer	174 (–94)
3	9	Jamie McMurray	163 (–105)
1	10	Kevin Harvick	154 (–114)
	11	Ryan Newman	152 (–116)
1	12	Kasey Kahne	146 (–122)
2	13	Erik Jones	144 (–124)
3	14	Jimmie Johnson	141 (–127)
1	15	Trevor Bayne	140 (–128)
4	16	Denny Hamlin	139 (–129)
Official driver's standings

Manufacturers' Championship standings

	Pos	Manufacturer	Points
1	1	Ford	236
1	2	Chevrolet	234 (–2)
	3	Toyota	222 (–14)
Official manufacturers' standings

- Note: Only the first 16 positions are included for the driver standings.

Previous race: 2017 Auto Club 400	Monster Energy NASCAR Cup Series; 2017 season	Next race: 2017 O'Reilly Auto Parts 500
