= 2016 GEICO 500 =

Race details
- Race 10 of 36 in the 2016 NASCAR Sprint Cup Series
- Date: May 1, 2016
- Location: Talladega Superspeedway in Lincoln, Alabama
- Course: Permanent racing facility
- Course length: 2.66 miles (4.28 km)
- Distance: 188 laps, 500.08 mi (804.64 km)
- Average speed: 140.046 mph (225.382 km/h)

Pole position
Driver	Chase Elliott	Hendrick Motorsports
- Time: 49.704

Most laps led
Driver	Brad Keselowski	Team Penske
- Laps: 46

Winner
No. 2	Brad Keselowski	Team Penske

Television in the United States
- Network: Fox
- Announcers: Mike Joy, Jeff Gordon and Darrell Waltrip
- Nielsen ratings: 3.8 (Overnight); 4.0 (Final); 6.7 million viewers

Radio in the United States
- Radio: MRN
- Booth announcers: Joe Moore, Jeff Striegle and Rusty Wallace
- Turn announcers: Dave Moody (1 & 2), Mike Bagley (Backstretch) and Kyle Rickey (3 & 4)

The 2016 GEICO 500 was a NASCAR Sprint Cup Series race scheduled that was held on May 1, 2016, at Talladega Superspeedway in Lincoln, Alabama. Contested over 188 laps on the 2.66 mile (4.28 km) superspeedway, it was the 10th race of the 2016 NASCAR Sprint Cup Series season. Brad Keselowski won the race. Kyle Busch finished second. Austin Dillon, Jamie McMurray and Chase Elliott rounded out the top-five, The race had 37 lead changes among different drivers and ten cautions for 41 laps.

== Report ==
=== Background ===
Talladega Superspeedway, the track where the race was held.

Talladega Superspeedway is a 2.660 mi (4.281 km) tri-oval superspeedway in Lincoln, Alabama. Entering the race, Carl Edwards leads the points with 331, while Kevin Harvick is 7 points back, Jimmie Johnson is 21 points back, Kyle Busch is 29 points back, and Joey Logano is 32 points back.

=== Entry list ===
The entry list for the GEICO 500 was released on Monday, April 25 at 10:42 a.m. Eastern time. Forty-one cars are entered for the race.

No.	Driver	Team	Manufacturer
1	Jamie McMurray	Chip Ganassi Racing	Chevrolet
2	Brad Keselowski	Team Penske	Ford
3	Austin Dillon	Richard Childress Racing	Chevrolet
4	Kevin Harvick	Stewart–Haas Racing	Chevrolet
5	Kasey Kahne	Hendrick Motorsports	Chevrolet
6	Trevor Bayne	Roush Fenway Racing	Ford
7	Regan Smith	Tommy Baldwin Racing	Chevrolet
10	Danica Patrick	Stewart–Haas Racing	Chevrolet
11	Denny Hamlin	Joe Gibbs Racing	Toyota
13	Casey Mears	Germain Racing	Chevrolet
14	Tony Stewart	Stewart–Haas Racing	Chevrolet
15	Clint Bowyer	HScott Motorsports	Chevrolet
16	Greg Biffle	Roush Fenway Racing	Ford
17	Ricky Stenhouse Jr.	Roush Fenway Racing	Ford
18	Kyle Busch	Joe Gibbs Racing	Toyota
19	Carl Edwards	Joe Gibbs Racing	Toyota
20	Matt Kenseth	Joe Gibbs Racing	Toyota
21	Ryan Blaney (R)	Wood Brothers Racing	Ford
22	Joey Logano	Team Penske	Ford
23	David Ragan	BK Racing	Toyota
24	Chase Elliott (R)	Hendrick Motorsports	Chevrolet
27	Paul Menard	Richard Childress Racing	Chevrolet
30	Josh Wise	The Motorsports Group	Chevrolet
31	Ryan Newman	Richard Childress Racing	Chevrolet
32	Bobby Labonte	Go FAS Racing	Ford
34	Chris Buescher (R)	Front Row Motorsports	Ford
35	David Gilliland	Front Row Motorsports	Ford
38	Landon Cassill	Front Row Motorsports	Ford
41	Kurt Busch	Stewart–Haas Racing	Chevrolet
42	Kyle Larson	Chip Ganassi Racing	Chevrolet
43	Aric Almirola	Richard Petty Motorsports	Ford
44	Brian Scott (R)	Richard Petty Motorsports	Ford
46	Michael Annett	HScott Motorsports	Chevrolet
47	A. J. Allmendinger	JTG Daugherty Racing	Chevrolet
48	Jimmie Johnson	Hendrick Motorsports	Chevrolet
55	Michael Waltrip	Premium Motorsports	Toyota
78	Martin Truex Jr.	Furniture Row Racing	Toyota
83	Matt DiBenedetto	BK Racing	Toyota
88	Dale Earnhardt Jr.	Hendrick Motorsports	Chevrolet
95	Michael McDowell	Circle Sport – Leavine Family Racing	Chevrolet
98	Cole Whitt	Premium Motorsports	Toyota
Official entry list

== Practice ==
=== First practice ===
Jamie McMurray was the fastest in the first practice session with a time of 47.943 and a speed of 199.737 mph (321.446 km/h).

Pos	No.	Driver	Team	Manufacturer	Time	Speed
1	1	Jamie McMurray	Chip Ganassi Racing	Chevrolet	47.943	199.737
2	24	Chase Elliott (R)	Hendrick Motorsports	Chevrolet	47.945	199.729
3	41	Kurt Busch	Stewart–Haas Racing	Chevrolet	48.022	199.409
Official first practice results

=== Final practice ===
Joey Logano was the fastest in the final practice session with a time of 48.785 and a speed of 196.290 mph (315.898 km/h).

Pos	No.	Driver	Team	Manufacturer	Time	Speed
1	22	Joey Logano	Team Penske	Ford	48.785	196.290
2	21	Ryan Blaney (R)	Wood Brothers Racing	Ford	48.798	196.238
3	24	Chase Elliott (R)	Hendrick Motorsports	Chevrolet	48.811	196.185
Official final practice results

== Qualifying ==
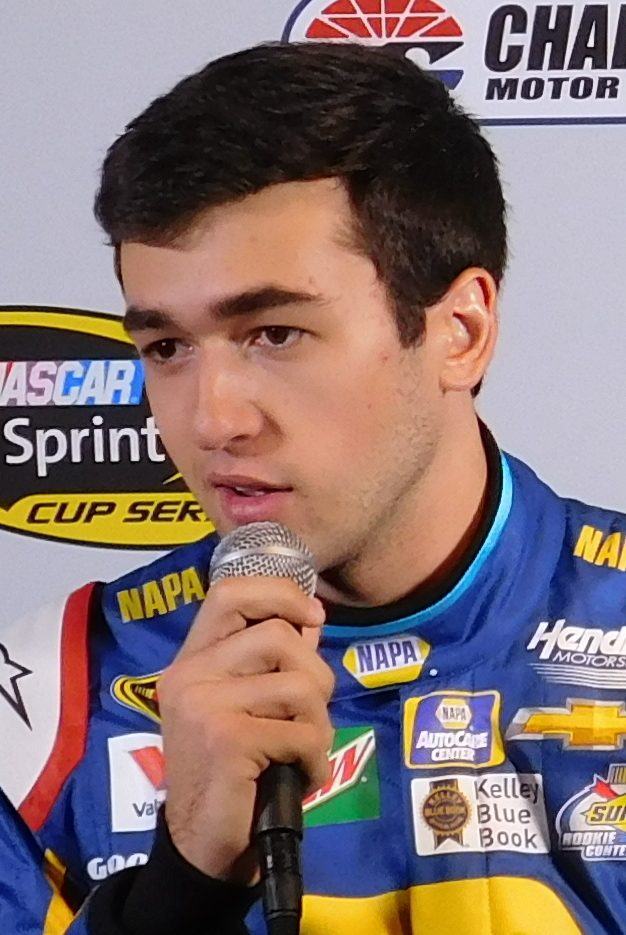
Chase Elliott scored the pole position.

Chase Elliott scored the pole for the race with a time of 49.704 and a speed of 192.661 mph (310.058 km/h). He said afterwards that like he "said in Daytona, this is all team guys. This had nothing to do with me and they have brought a fast car back. This is our same car that we ran at Daytona. Unfortunately I didn’t bring it home in one piece (at Daytona), they had to fix it, but they did a great job doing that and hopefully we can just try to be smart, try to cut down on some of the dumb mistakes I made in February and try to give ourselves a shot and be there at the end.”

Austin Dillon, who qualified second, talked about how the No. 24 team "has won all the poles the last two years at speedways it seems like. To be that close to him and we know we can get a little better here and there, but that is just the big pick up. I think we qualified 24th here the last race. Huge pick up for us and we are excited for the race.”

Dale Earnhardt Jr., who qualified third, said he "picked up a little bit. I was just talking with Kasey (Kahne) about our lines and what we did different. We think we saw a little bit out there that makes a difference. We were able to pick up a little bit. It’s hard to move forward in the second round at speedways. Usually what you’ve got in the first round is what you’ve got in the second round, but we jumped a couple of guys and got a better starting spot.”

=== Qualifying results ===
Pos	No.	Driver	Team	Manufacturer	R1	R2
1	24	Chase Elliott (R)	Hendrick Motorsports	Chevrolet	49.766	49.704
2	3	Austin Dillon	Richard Childress Racing	Chevrolet	49.669	49.765
3	88	Dale Earnhardt Jr.	Hendrick Motorsports	Chevrolet	49.853	49.799
4	20	Matt Kenseth	Joe Gibbs Racing	Toyota	49.824	49.828
5	48	Jimmie Johnson	Hendrick Motorsports	Chevrolet	49.918	49.845
6	17	Ricky Stenhouse Jr.	Roush Fenway Racing	Ford	49.775	49.852
7	2	Brad Keselowski	Team Penske	Ford	49.831	49.873
8	11	Denny Hamlin	Joe Gibbs Racing	Toyota	49.979	49.887
9	19	Carl Edwards	Joe Gibbs Racing	Toyota	49.984	49.922
10	27	Paul Menard	Richard Childress Racing	Chevrolet	49.907	49.924
11	5	Kasey Kahne	Hendrick Motorsports	Chevrolet	49.802	49.930
12	78	Martin Truex Jr.	Furniture Row Racing	Toyota	49.973	49.984
13	6	Trevor Bayne	Roush Fenway Racing	Ford	49.988	
14	14	Tony Stewart	Stewart Haas Racing	Chevrolet	50.000	
15	31	Ryan Newman	Richard Childress Racing	Chevrolet	50.058	
16	16	Greg Biffle	Roush Fenway Racing	Ford	50.086	
17	18	Kyle Busch	Joe Gibbs Racing	Toyota	50.093	
18	41	Kurt Busch	Stewart–Haas Racing	Chevrolet	50.126	
19	21	Ryan Blaney (R)	Wood Brothers Racing	Ford	50.157	
20	13	Casey Mears	Germain Racing	Chevrolet	50.196	
21	44	Brian Scott (R)	Richard Petty Motorsports	Ford	50.207	
22	22	Joey Logano	Team Penske	Ford	50.299	
23	43	Aric Almirola	Richard Petty Motorsports	Ford	50.331	
24	42	Kyle Larson	Chip Ganassi Racing	Chevrolet	50.356	
25	7	Regan Smith	Tommy Baldwin Racing	Chevrolet	50.371	
26	32	Bobby Labonte	Go FAS Racing	Ford	50.409	
27	34	Chris Buescher (R)	Front Row Motorsports	Ford	50.420	
28	47	A. J. Allmendinger	JTG Daugherty Racing	Chevrolet	50.421	
29	4	Kevin Harvick	Stewart–Haas Racing	Chevrolet	50.453	
30	1	Jamie McMurray	Chip Ganassi Racing	Chevrolet	50.472	
31	95	Michael McDowell	Circle Sport – Leavine Family Racing	Chevrolet	50.528	
32	38	Landon Cassill	Front Row Motorsports	Ford	50.541	
33	55	Michael Waltrip	Premium Motorsports	Toyota	50.583	
34	15	Clint Bowyer	HScott Motorsports	Chevrolet	50.660	
35	83	Matt DiBenedetto	BK Racing	Toyota	50.664	
36	98	Cole Whitt	Premium Motorsports	Toyota	50.677	
37	10	Danica Patrick	Stewart–Haas Racing	Chevrolet	50.679	
38	46	Michael Annett	HScott Motorsports	Chevrolet	50.807	
39	35	David Gilliland	Front Row Motorsports	Ford	50.810	
40	23	David Ragan	BK Racing	Toyota	51.035	
Did not qualify
41	30	Josh Wise	The Motorsports Group	Chevrolet	51.573	
Official qualifying results

== Race ==
=== First half ===
==== Start ====
Under overcast Alabama skies, Chase Elliott led the field to the green flag at 1:04 p.m. By the end of the first lap, most of the field was racing three-wide. Matt Kenseth used the bottom line coming to the line to take the lead on lap 15. By lap 24, he settled on the bottom with teammate Denny Hamlin in tow. Elliott used the middle line to pass Kenseth on the backstretch and retake the lead on lap 29. A number of cars began pitting on lap 36. Elliott hit pit road on lap 38 and handed the lead to Michael Waltrip. He pitted the next lap and the lead cycled back Kyle Busch. Brian Scott and Landon Cassill were tagged for their crews being over the wall too soon and Trevor Bayne and Casey Mears were tagged for speeding and all were forced to serve pass-through penalties.

==== Second quarter ====
The first caution of the race flew on lap 49 for a three-car wreck on the backstretch. Exiting turn 2, Dale Earnhardt Jr. got loose, turned up the track and slammed the wall. This also collected Kasey Kahne and Matt DiBenedetto. Earnhardt said afterwards that the car's "splitter was on the ground real bad the whole first run and we took some rounds out of the back and that really made the car too loose off the corner. Same thing we did at Daytona. We’ve just go to look at our adjustments a little bit different.” Waltrip opted not to pit and assumed the lead. Under the caution, Tony Stewart pulled onto pit road to get out and allow Ty Dillon to take over. Stewart said afterwards that the whole situation "sucks, to be honest. I know why we got to do it, but it sucks. It still sucks that you have to do it, but if I hadn’t broke my back at the end of January, we wouldn’t be in this situation. Good news is this is the last time we have to do it, and I am back in next week.”

The race restarted on lap 58. Kenseth used the outside line to retake the lead the next lap. The second caution of the race flew the same lap for a three-car wreck in turn 3. Going down the backstretch, Waltrip was shoved onto the apron. He came back up and side-swiped Mears. Aric Almirola was also caught in the wreck.

The race restarted on lap 63. Brad Keselowski used the outside line to take the lead on lap 73. From lap 83 to lap 90, Keselowski and Hamlin swapped the lead back and forth multiple times. Eventually, Keselowski jumped ahead and started blocking the advances of the three lines of cars. As the field closed in on the halfway point of the race, rain began being reported. The third caution of the race flew on lap 97 for a multi-car wreck on the backstretch. During that wreck, Chris Buescher flipped multiple times, causing the car to land back on all fours. Michael Annett, Jimmie Johnson, Carl Edwards, and Austin Dillon were also involved. Buescher said afterwards that the wreck "was so quick I never had any time to react. We got clipped in the right rear and as soon as it turned it went up on its lid. I thought we were clear of the wreck. I saw it happening in front of us and checked up and the next thing I knew I was upside down. I am pretty sick and tired of speedway racing at this point. It has been a rough year for that. We felt we were decent this race. We were holding our own and waiting but here we are. It is unfortunate. I really hate it for the guys.”

=== Second half ===
==== Halfway ====
The race restarted on lap 103. Kevin Harvick took over the lead on lap 101. Elliott took the lead on lap 104. Harvick took back the lead on lap 108. Trevor Bayne took the race lead on lap 110. The fourth caution of the race flew with 79 laps to go for a multi-car wreck in turn 1, involving Earnhardt Jr. and Carl Edwards after he suffered a right-front tire blowout and slammed the wall collecting Earnhardt. Edwards said afterwards that something on his car "just let go there and you hate to collect anybody, so definitely sorry to the 88 guys for getting their car involved in that. We had something torn up there, drove down into turn one, and I just felt the right front fall down and that was it. You’re kind of just along for the ride.” Earnhardt would go on to finish 40th.

The race restarted with 73 laps to go. Harvick beat Bayne to the line to take the lead with 72 laps to go. Bayne worked his way back to the lead on the bottom with 70 laps to go. Harvick retook it with 69 to go. Bayne took back the lead with 65 laps to go. The fifth caution of the race flew with 62 laps to go for a single-car spin in turn 4 involving Kahne.

The race restarted with 55 laps to go. Kyle Larson used the middle line to take the lead with 51 laps to go. Bayne retook it with 49 laps to go. Larson pulled ahead of Bayne the next lap. Kenseth pulled ahead to the lead with 43 laps to go. The sixth caution of the race flew with 35 laps to go after David Ragan blew an engine in turn 2.

==== Fourth quarter ====
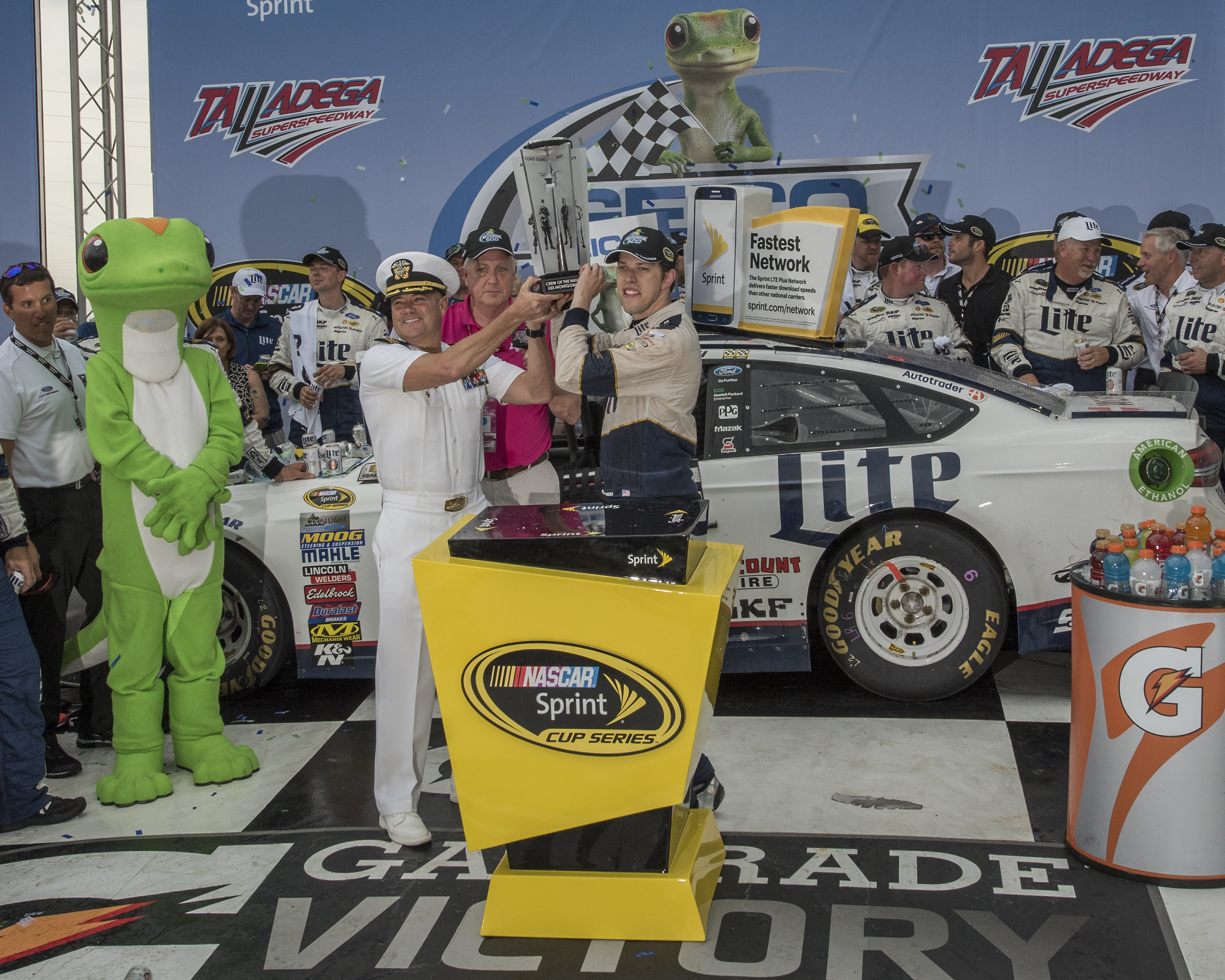
Brad Keselowski won the race.

The race restarted with 33 laps to go. Bayne retook the lead with 32 laps to go. Keselowski retook the lead with 31 laps to go. The seventh caution of the race flew with 26 laps to go for a multi-car wreck in turn 1 that collected 21 cars.

The race restarted with 22 laps to go. Logano took the lead with 20 to go. Debris in turn 2 brought out the eighth caution of the race with 19 laps to go.

The race restarted with 17 laps to go. Keselowski retook the lead with 16 laps to go. The ninth caution of the race flew with eight laps to go for a multi-car wreck on the backstretch that collected 12 cars. Danica Patrick, who slammed the wall head-on at a high speed, said she "would say that's probably the most scared (I've been), trying to hop out of a car with the fire on the inside. I haven't had fire on the inside before. I've seen it on the outside. Honestly, I was thinking about my hair. I've got a lot of hair and I don't want to lose it. I've had a couple of practice rounds now of getting out of the car as quickly as possible, but that was the worst one so far. At Daytona a couple of years ago on the front straight without a SAFER barrier was probably one of the hardest impacts, but this one was probably worse." Kenseth, whose car blew over and slid down the backstretch, said that Logano "ran me off the race track and that got me way behind so I thought we were done with that, but maybe we aren't. So he ran me off the track and honestly I was just going straight here and just got ran into and then I was just hanging on."

The race restarted with four laps to go and Keselowski scored the victory as the field wrecked behind him in the tri-oval. Involving Kevin Harvick who nearly flipped, Ricky Stenhouse Jr., A. J. Allmendinger, and Martin Truex and Cole Whitt.

== Race results ==
Pos	No.	Driver	Team	Manufacturer	Laps	Points
1	2	Brad Keselowski	Team Penske	Ford	188	45
2	18	Kyle Busch	Joe Gibbs Racing	Toyota	188	40
3	3	Austin Dillon	Richard Childress Racing	Chevrolet	188	38
4	1	Jamie McMurray	Chip Ganassi Racing	Chevrolet	188	37
5	24	Chase Elliott (R)	Hendrick Motorsports	Chevrolet	188	37
6	14	Ty Dillon	Stewart–Haas Racing	Chevrolet	188	35
7	15	Clint Bowyer	HScott Motorsports	Chevrolet	188	34
8	41	Kurt Busch	Stewart–Haas Racing	Chevrolet	188	33
9	21	Ryan Blaney (R)	Wood Brothers Racing	Ford	188	32
10	6	Trevor Bayne	Roush Fenway Racing	Ford	188	32
11	38	Landon Cassill	Front Row Motorsports	Ford	188	30
12	55	Michael Waltrip	Premium Motorsports	Toyota	188	30
13	78	Martin Truex Jr.	Furniture Row Racing	Toyota	188	28
14	47	A. J. Allmendinger	JTG Daugherty Racing	Chevrolet	188	28
15	4	Kevin Harvick	Stewart–Haas Racing	Chevrolet	188	27
16	17	Ricky Stenhouse Jr.	Roush Fenway Racing	Ford	188	25
17	35	David Gilliland	Front Row Motorsports	Ford	188	24
18	98	Cole Whitt	Premium Motorsports	Toyota	188	24
19	32	Bobby Labonte	Go FAS Racing	Ford	188	23
20	16	Greg Biffle	Roush Fenway Racing	Ford	188	21
21	95	Michael McDowell	Circle Sport – Leavine Family Racing	Chevrolet	188	20
22	48	Jimmie Johnson	Hendrick Motorsports	Chevrolet	182	19
23	20	Matt Kenseth	Joe Gibbs Racing	Toyota	180	19
24	10	Danica Patrick	Stewart–Haas Racing	Chevrolet	180	18
25	22	Joey Logano	Team Penske	Ford	180	17
26	27	Paul Menard	Richard Childress Racing	Chevrolet	180	15
27	43	Aric Almirola	Richard Petty Motorsports	Ford	180	15
28	31	Ryan Newman	Richard Childress Racing	Chevrolet	178	14
29	42	Kyle Larson	Chip Ganassi Racing	Chevrolet	173	13
30	44	Brian Scott (R)	Richard Petty Motorsports	Ford	172	11
31	11	Denny Hamlin	Joe Gibbs Racing	Toyota	170	11
32	7	Regan Smith	Tommy Baldwin Racing	Chevrolet	168	9
33	13	Casey Mears	Germain Racing	Chevrolet	166	8
34	23	David Ragan	BK Racing	Toyota	151	8
35	19	Carl Edwards	Joe Gibbs Racing	Toyota	109	6
36	83	Matt DiBenedetto	BK Racing	Toyota	98	5
37	34	Chris Buescher (R)	Front Row Motorsports	Ford	95	4
38	46	Michael Annett	HScott Motorsports	Chevrolet	94	3
39	5	Kasey Kahne	Hendrick Motorsports	Chevrolet	82	2
40	88	Dale Earnhardt Jr.	Hendrick Motorsports	Chevrolet	63	1
Official race results

=== Race summary ===
- Lead changes: 37 among different drivers
- Cautions/Laps: 10 for 41
- Red flags: 0
- Time of race: 3 hours, 34 minutes and 15 seconds
- Average speed: 140.046 miles per hour (225.382 km/h)

== Media ==
=== Television ===
Fox Sports covered their 16th race at the Talladega Superspeedway. Mike Joy, six-time Talladega winner – and all-time restrictor plate race winner – Jeff Gordon and four-time Talladega winner Darrell Waltrip had the call in the booth for the race. Jamie Little, Chris Neville, Vince Welch and Matt Yocum handled the action on pit road for the television side.

Fox Television
Booth announcers	Pit reporters
Lap-by-lap: Mike Joy; Color-commentator: Jeff Gordon; Color commentator: Darrell Waltrip	Jamie Little; Chris Neville; Vince Welch; Matt Yocum

=== Radio ===
MRN had the radio call for the race which was also simulcast on Sirius XM NASCAR Radio. Joe Moore, Jeff Striegle and Rusty Wallace called the race in the booth when the field raced through the tri-oval. Dave Moody called the race from the Sunoco spotters stand outside turn 2 when the field raced through turns 1 and 2. Mike Bagley called the race from a platform inside the backstretch when the field raced down the backstretch. Kyle Rickey called the race from the Sunoco spotters stand outside turn 4 when the field raced through turns 3 and 4. Alex Hayden, Winston Kelley and Steve Post worked pit road for the radio side.

MRN Radio
Booth announcers	Turn announcers	Pit reporters
Lead announcer: Joe Moore; Announcer: Jeff Striegle; Announcer: Rusty Wallace	Turns 1 & 2: Dave Moody; Backstretch: Mike Bagley; Turns 3 & 4: Kyle Rickey	Alex Hayden; Winston Kelley; Steve Post

== Standings after the race ==
Drivers' Championship standings

	Pos	Driver	Points
1	1	Kevin Harvick	351
2	2	Kyle Busch	342 (–9)
2	3	Carl Edwards	337 (–14)
1	4	Jimmie Johnson	329 (–22)
	5	Joey Logano	316 (–35)
	6	Kurt Busch	312 (–39)
2	7	Brad Keselowski	300 (–51)
1	8	Dale Earnhardt Jr.	279 (–72)
1	9	Martin Truex Jr.	274 (–77)
2	10	Austin Dillon	272 (–79)
	11	Chase Elliott (R)	271 (–80)
4	12	Denny Hamlin	269 (–82)
	13	Jamie McMurray	261 (–90)
3	14	A. J. Allmendinger	232 (–119)
	15	Matt Kenseth	231 (–120)
2	16	Trevor Bayne	228 (–123)
Official driver's standings

Manufacturers' Championship standings

Pos	Manufacturer	Points
1	Toyota	420
2	Chevrolet	404 (–16)
3	Ford	368 (–52)
Official manufacturers' standings

- Note: Only the first 16 positions are included for the driver standings.
  . – Driver has clinched a Chase position.

Previous race: 2016 Toyota Owners 400	Sprint Cup Series; 2016 season	Next race: 2016 Go Bowling 400
