= 2001 Trans-Am Series =

American sports car racing competition

Seasons
- ← 2000 2002 →

The 2001 Trans-Am Series was the 36th season of the Sports Car Club of America's Trans-Am Series. The victory at Portland would mark Dodge's final Trans Am win until the 2012 Trans-Am Series.

== Results ==
| Round | Circuit | Winning driver | Winning vehicle |
|---|---|---|---|
| 1 | Sebring | (United States) Boris Said | Ford Mustang |
| 2 | Long Beach | (United States) Lou Gigliotti | Chevrolet Corvette |
| 3 | Mosport Park | (United States) Paul Gentilozzi | Jaguar XKR |
| 4 | Detroit | (United States) Paul Gentilozzi | Jaguar XKR |
| 5 | Cleveland | (United States) Paul Gentilozzi | Jaguar XKR |
| 6 | Sonoma | (United States) Brian Simo | Qvale Mangusta |
| 7 | Portland | (United States) Tommy Archer | Dodge Viper |
| 8 | Road America | (United States) Michael Lewis | Jaguar XKR |
| 9 | Mid-Ohio | (United States) Paul Gentilozzi | Jaguar XKR |
| 10 | Laguna Seca | (United Kingdom) Justin Bell | Chevrolet Corvette |
| 11 | Houston | (United Kingdom) Justin Bell | Chevrolet Corvette |

== Championships ==
=== Drivers ===
1. Paul Gentilozzi - 287 points
2. Brian Simo - 255 points
3. Johnny Miller - 255 points
4. Tommy Archer - 221 points
5. Justin Bell - 219 points
6. Lou Gigliotti - 214 points
7. Michael Lewis - 197 points
8. Boris Said - 166 points
9. Bob Ruman - 142 points
10. Leighton Reese - 140 points

=== Owners ===
1. Rocketsports#64 - 142
2. Rocketsports#3 - 140
3. Cinjo Racing#36 - 138
4. Ruhlman Motorsports#49 - 134
5. TDM Motorsports#15 - 132
6. Fix Motorsports#77 - 127
7. LAC Motorsports#35 - 123
8. Derhaag Motorsports#40 - 122
9. Autocon Motorsports#12 - 116
10. TDM Motorsports#05 - 115

=== Manufacturers ===
1. Jaguar – 139 points
2. Chevrolet – 117 points
3. Qvale Automobiles – 80 points
4. Dodge – 80 points
5. Panoz – 44 points
6. Ford – 36 points
