= Kjell Qvale =

American businessman (1919–2013)

- Born: July 17, 1919; Trondheim, Norway
- Died: November 2, 2013 (aged 94); San Francisco, California, U.S.
- Occupations: Entrepreneur, thoroughbred race horse breeder
- Children: Jeff, Bruce

Kjell Qvale (July 7, 1919 – November 2, 2013) was a Norwegian-American business executive. Qvale was one of the key figures in the creation of the Jensen-Healey. Qvale became the first distributor for Jaguar on the West Coast. Qvale was one of the founders of the San Francisco Auto Show and the Pebble Beach Concours d'Elegance. He was credited with the concept of the Corkscrew signature corner of Laguna Seca.

== Early life ==
Kjell Qvale was born in Trondheim, Norway, and was the son of a Norwegian sea captain. He moved to the United States in 1929. Qvale attended the University of Washington and was a U.S. Navy pilot during World War II.

Qvale was an All-American sprinter for the Washington Huskies track and field team, finishing 6th in the 200 metres at the 1941 NCAA track and field championships. At age 20, he unofficially tied the world record in the 100-yard dash.

== Car importing, dealing and manufacturing ==
On a trip to New Orleans, Qvale saw an MG TC, an English sports car made by Morris Garages. He decided to import MG cars into the United States, believing that since he found the car so appealing other people would too. He established a business near San Francisco and diversified by adding other car brands including Austin, Morris, Jaguar, and Rolls-Royce. The business traded under the name 'British Motor Car Distributors'. Later Qvale further diversified his business interests by importing non-British brands including Volkswagen (exclusive distributor of the first Volkswagens in the Western United States), Porsche, De Tomaso, Maserati and Lamborghini. For a brief period Qvale moved into car manufacturing by acquiring a significant stake in Jensen Motors.

== Jensen and the Jensen-Healey ==
By 1970, Qvale's organization was selling more than 160,000 cars in the United States. The Austin-Healey, produced by the British Motor Corporation (BMC), was popular with American buyers. BMC's announcement that it would end production of Austin-Healeys created a problem for Qvale, who stood to lose sales. It was also unwelcome news for Austin-Healey's designer Donald Healey – who received a royalty on each Austin-Healey sold – and for English car manufacturer, Jensen Motors, who built the Austin-Healeys for BMC. This prompted discussions between these three parties which ultimately led to a plan for the design and production of a vehicle to fill the gap the Austin-Healey would leave. In 1970 Kjell Qvale became the majority shareholder in Jensen Motors. The first production version of the Jensen-Healey was completed in 1972.

== Movie financing and Nico Minardos ==
In 1974 Nico Minardos approached Qvale for a product placement deal to use a Jensen Interceptor in Assault on Agathon, a motion picture Minardos was producing and starring in along with Marianne Faithfull. By Qvale's own account, "Minardos must be a better salesman than I am, because he ended up convincing me to finance the entire movie." The movie—a sort of knockoff James Bond thriller—was made, with prominent use of the Jensen car, and was distributed by MGM, but it failed dismally at the box office and Qvale wrote off his investment. As Qvale recounted to Minardos's godson, Owen Prell, in the 2010 documentary film, Finding Nico, "I have no regrets. It was a fun experience being a Hollywood producer."

== Qvale Automotive Group ==
Kjell Qvale's son, Bruce Qvale, founded automobile manufacturer Qvale. Qvale was an independent Italian car manufacturer founded in 2000. Qvale's sole product was the Qvale Mangusta, originally the De Tomaso Biguà. In 2003, Qvale sold the rights to the Mangusta to MG Rover Group.

== Horse racing ==
Qvale spent a lifetime owning and racing thoroughbred racehorses. He was president of the Pacific Racing Association at Golden Gate Fields and also served as chairman of the board of Bay Meadows Racetrack. He headed the board of directors at Golden Gate Fields for 25 years (where his horses still run) and his breeding farm in the Napa Valley was the last home of the legendary Silky Sullivan. In the 1980s he campaigned his homebred Variety Road, only missing a campaign in the United States Triple Crown of Thoroughbred Racing because of the horse's ill health. Variety Road's biggest win came in the 1987 Grade I San Fernando Stakes, when he nipped Broad Brush at the wire with Snow Chief and Ferdinand right behind them.

== Death ==
Kjell Qvale died at the age of 94, still racing his horses. Until the day of his death he maintained an active racing stable in Napa, California. His last win came on October 20, 2013 at Santa Anita Park.

== Zodiac Killer theory ==
Writer Mike Rodelli accused Qvale of living a "double life" as the Zodiac Killer, an unidentified serial killer who murdered five people in the San Francisco Bay Area between 1968 and 1969. Qvale denied the allegation and threatened to sue Rodelli: "You can't find anybody in this city that’s less likely to be the Zodiac Killer than me”.
