= De Tomaso Mangusta =

Model of sports car

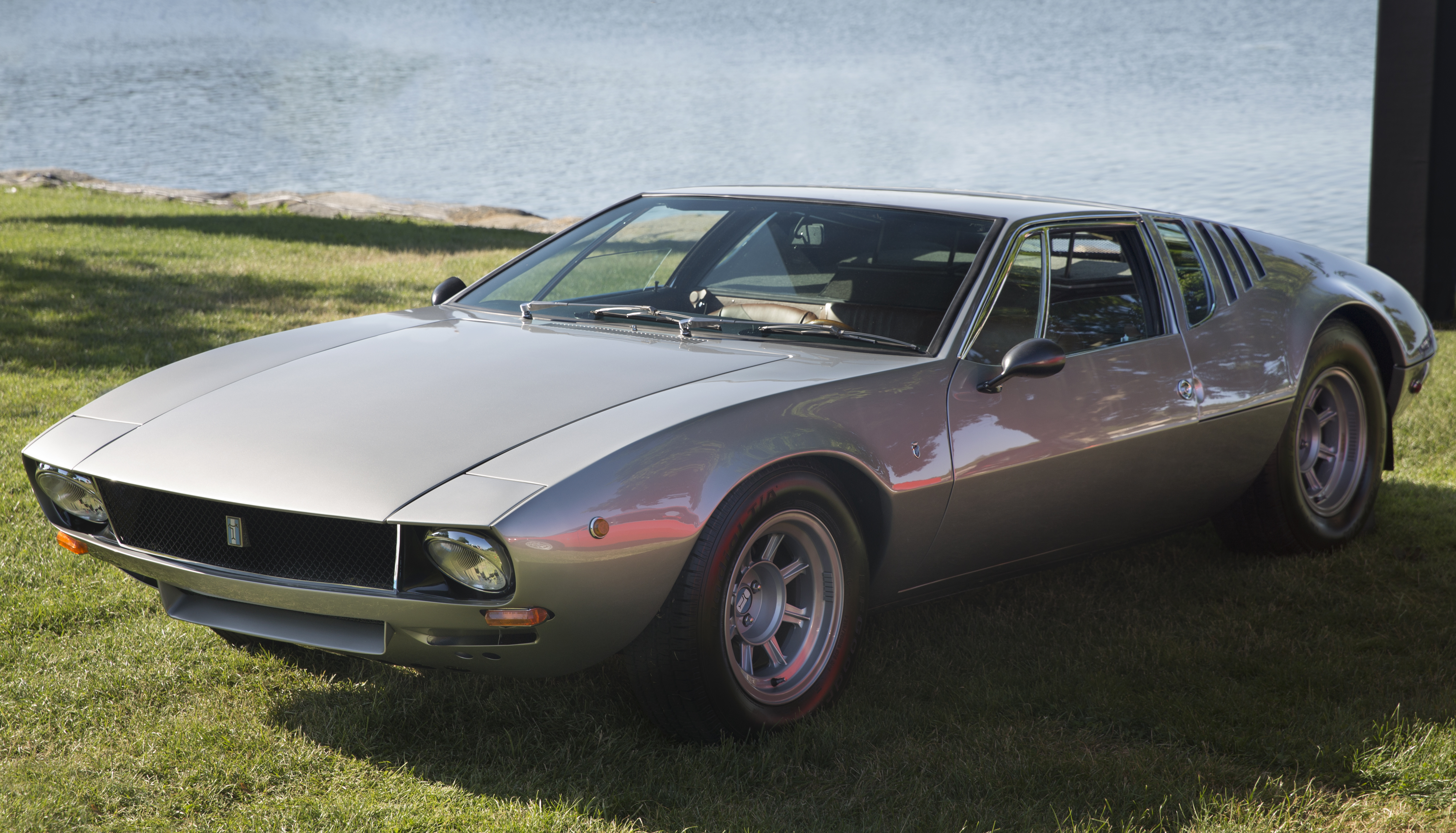

Overview
- Manufacturer: De Tomaso
- Production: 1967–1971 (401 produced)
- Assembly: Italy: Modena
- Designer: Giorgetto Giugiaro at Ghia

Body and chassis
- Class: Sports car (S)
- Body style: 2-door coupé
- Layout: Rear mid-engine, rear-wheel-drive

Powertrain
- Engine: 4.7 L (4,728 cc) Ford 289 V8; 4.9 L (4,942 cc) Ford 302 V8
- Transmission: ZF 5-speed manual

Dimensions
- Wheelbase: 2,500 mm (98.4 in)
- Length: 4,275 mm (168.3 in)
- Width: 1,834 mm (72.2 in)
- Height: 1,100 mm (43.3 in)
- Curb weight: 1,300 kg (2,866.0 lb)

Chronology
- Predecessor: De Tomaso Vallelunga
- Successor: De Tomaso Pantera

The De Tomaso Mangusta is a sports car produced by Italian automobile manufacturer De Tomaso between 1967 and 1971. It was succeeded by the De Tomaso Pantera.

== History ==
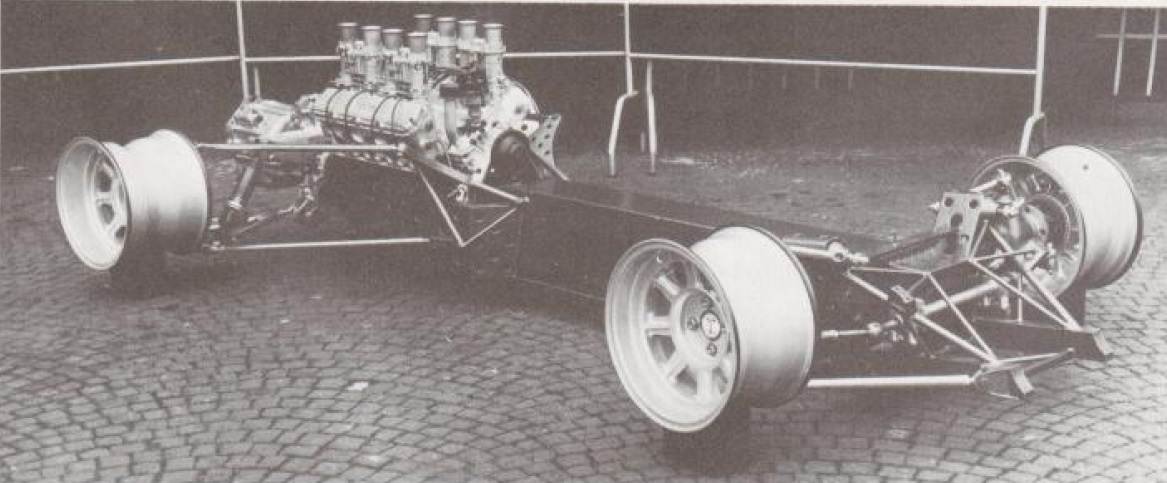
The Mangusta uses a modified version of the De Tomaso P70 chassis

The Mangusta replaced the Vallelunga model, on which its chassis was based. The word "mangusta" is Italian for "mongoose", an animal that can kill cobras. It was rumoured that the car was so named in retaliation to a failed deal between De Tomaso and Carroll Shelby. Alejandro de Tomaso offered to help Carroll Shelby to build a new Can-Am race car at the end of 1964 when Shelby found that the Shelby Cobra would not be able to compete there. De Tomaso was planning to develop a new 7.0-litre V8 engine for racing so he saw this as a perfect opportunity. Shelby agreed to finance the project and also sent a SCCA approved design team headed by Pete Brock to Italy in order to handle the design work. De Tomaso had conflicts on the design of the car. He also failed to deliver the agreed 5 race cars within the deadline for the 1965 Can-Am season. This caused Shelby to eventually back out of the project and join the development team of the Ford GT40. Peter Brock and his team were able to finish the car according to their will. De Tomaso engaged Carrozzeria Ghia to finalise the design of the car which was being developed under the project name of P70. The single completed car was displayed at the 1965 Turin Motor Show as the Ghia De Tomaso Sport 5000. De Tomaso then modified the steel backbone chassis of the P70 and it became the basis for the Mangusta, which was designed by Giorgetto Giugiaro at Ghia. One notable design feature is the centre-hinged, two-section bonnet that opens akin to gull-wing doors. The Mangusta entered production in 1967, at the same time De Tomaso had purchased Ghia.

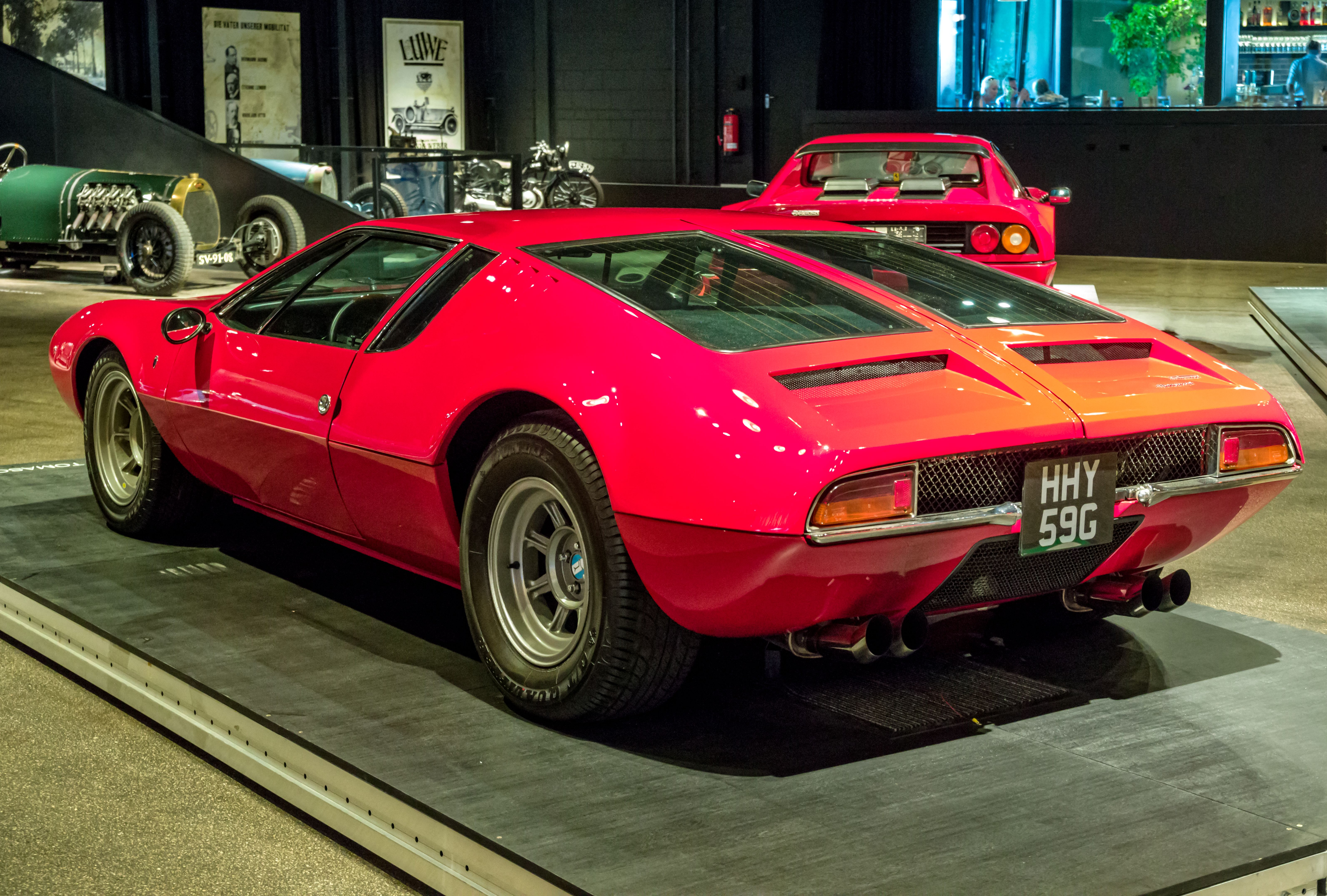
Rear view

401 cars in total were built, about 150 were made for Europe, while the remainder were made for North America. The initial cars are claimed to have a more powerful Ford HiPo 289 engine; the later cars all had Ford 302 engines. The Mangusta was imported into the United States via a federal waiver which applied to the car due to its small production numbers. The waiver exempted the car from safety regulations which were in effect at the time. The Mangusta came without seat belts and had headlights far lower than federal regulations permitted. When this exemption expired, the front of the North American car was redesigned in order to accommodate two pop-up headlamps instead of the quad round headlamps present earlier. These new headlamps functioned through a crude lever-and-cable arrangement, which fed into the cabin. An estimated 50 cars were produced in this configuration starting in 1969, however European cars continued with the original quad headlight grille. One car was built as a roadster (8ma512). One car was built with a high performance Chevrolet 327 engine for General Motors-Vice President, Bill Mitchell but soon sold to a GM employee, designer, Dick Ruzzin who has owned the car since.

== Specifications ==
The early European versions were fitted with a mid-mounted 306 hp (228 kW) Ford 289 V8 engine, driven through a 5-speed ZF transaxle; but for almost all Mangustas for both Europe and North America an unmodified "J Code" 230 hp (170 kW) Ford 302 V8 was used. All round Girling disc brakes and independent suspension, rack and pinion steering, air conditioning, and power windows were fitted, ahead of other manufacturers at the time. Journalist Paul Frère claimed he achieved a top speed of 250 km/h (155 mph) in the Mangusta.

The Mangusta, which has a 44/56 front/rear weight distribution, reportedly suffered from stability problems and poor handling. The car's cabin was also considered cramped and it had extremely low ground clearance.

== Revival ==
The Mangusta name was revived in the early 2000s when the concept car De Tomaso Biguà became the Qvale Mangusta, after a dispute between De Tomaso and business partner Qvale.

== Gallery ==
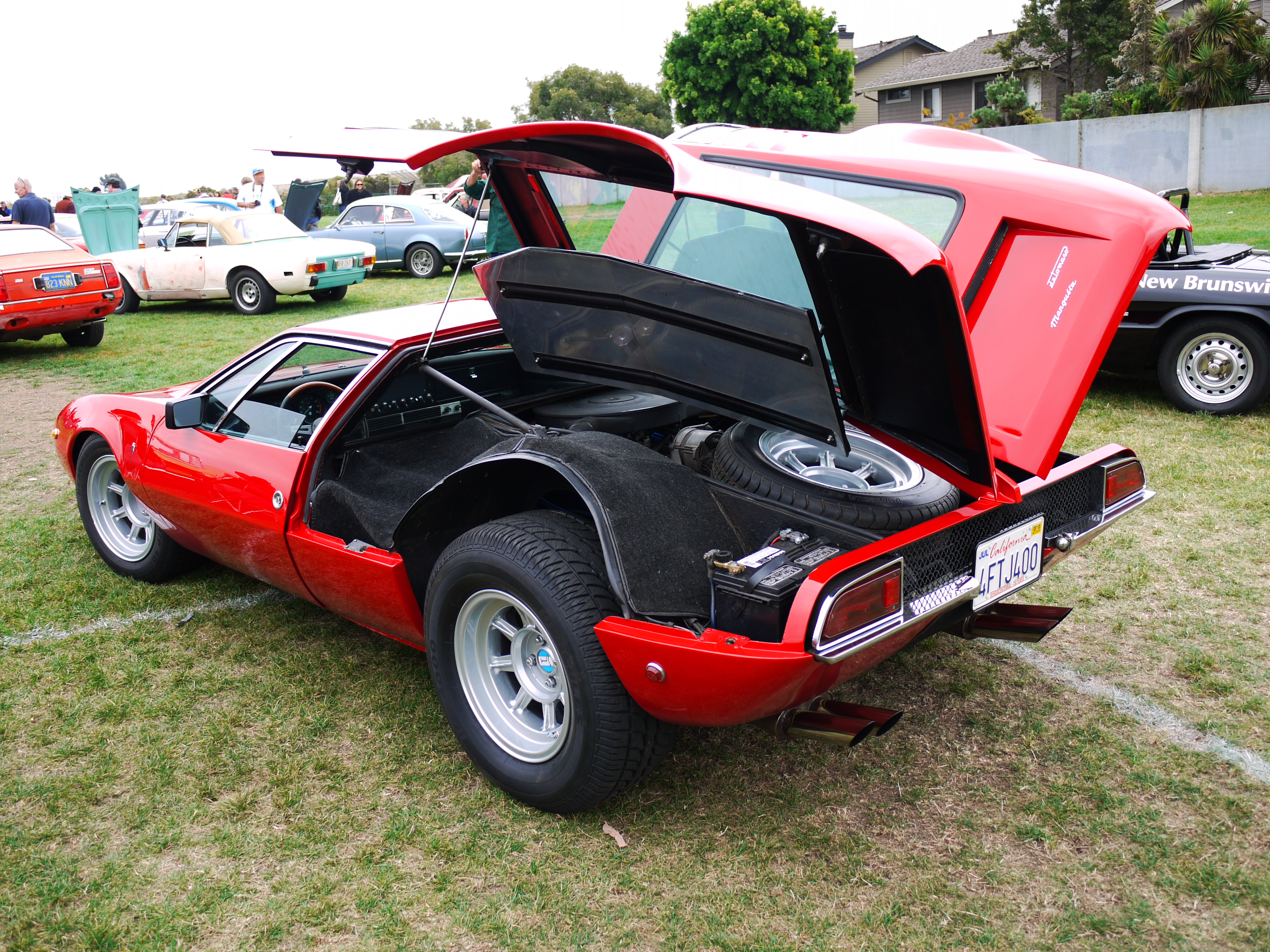
The De Tomaso Mangusta featured unique gull wing doors covering both the engine and luggage compartment

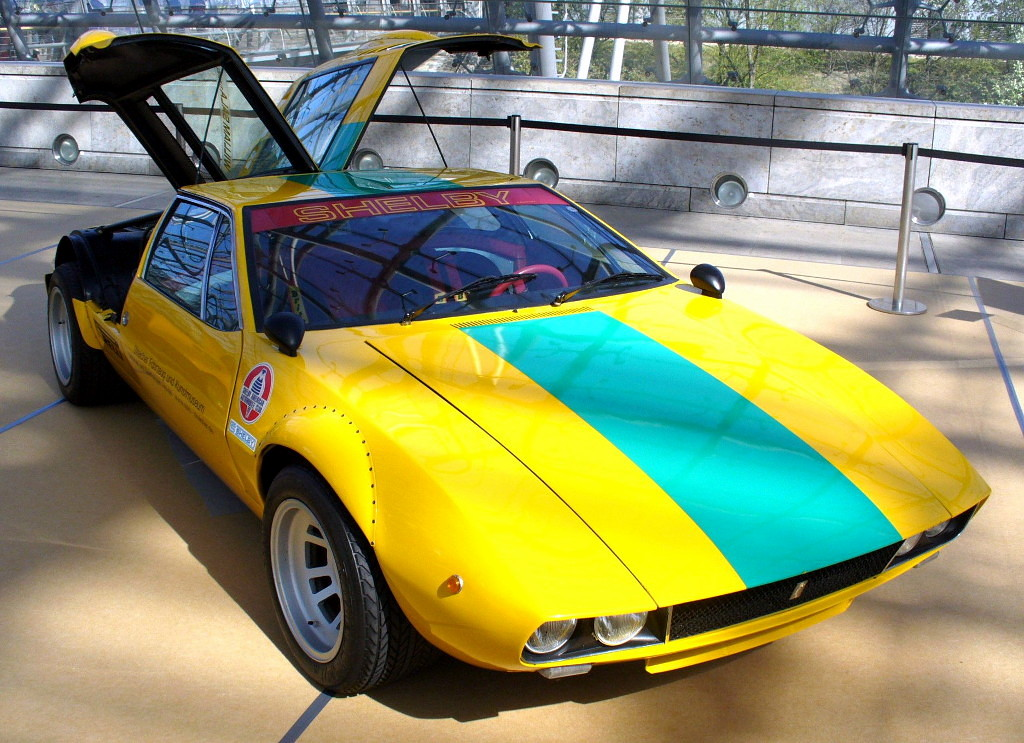
De Tomaso Mangusta Group 4 GT

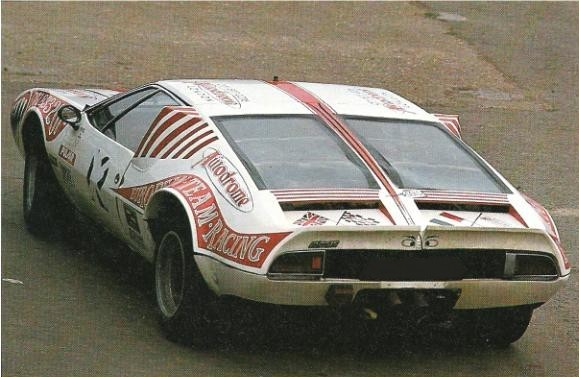
Mangusta in racing livery

== See also ==
- Alfa Romeo 33 Stradale
- Ferrari Daytona
- Iso Grifo
- Lamborghini Miura
- Maserati Ghibli
