= Qvale =

Automobile manufacturer

- Company type: Srl
- Industry: Automotive
- Founded: 2000
- Defunct: 2002
- Headquarters: Modena, Italy
- Website: www.qvaleauto.com

Qvale (/kəˈvɑːli/ kə-VAHL-ee) was an independent car manufacturer founded in 2000 by Bruce Qvale, the son of businessman Kjell Qvale. Based in Modena, Italy, Qvale's sole product was the Mangusta, originally the De Tomaso Biguà. Kjell Qvale founded British Motors in 1947 in San Francisco, California and was a well known importer of European luxury cars. He was the first distributor for Jaguar on the U.S. West Coast and one of the founders of the San Francisco Auto Show.

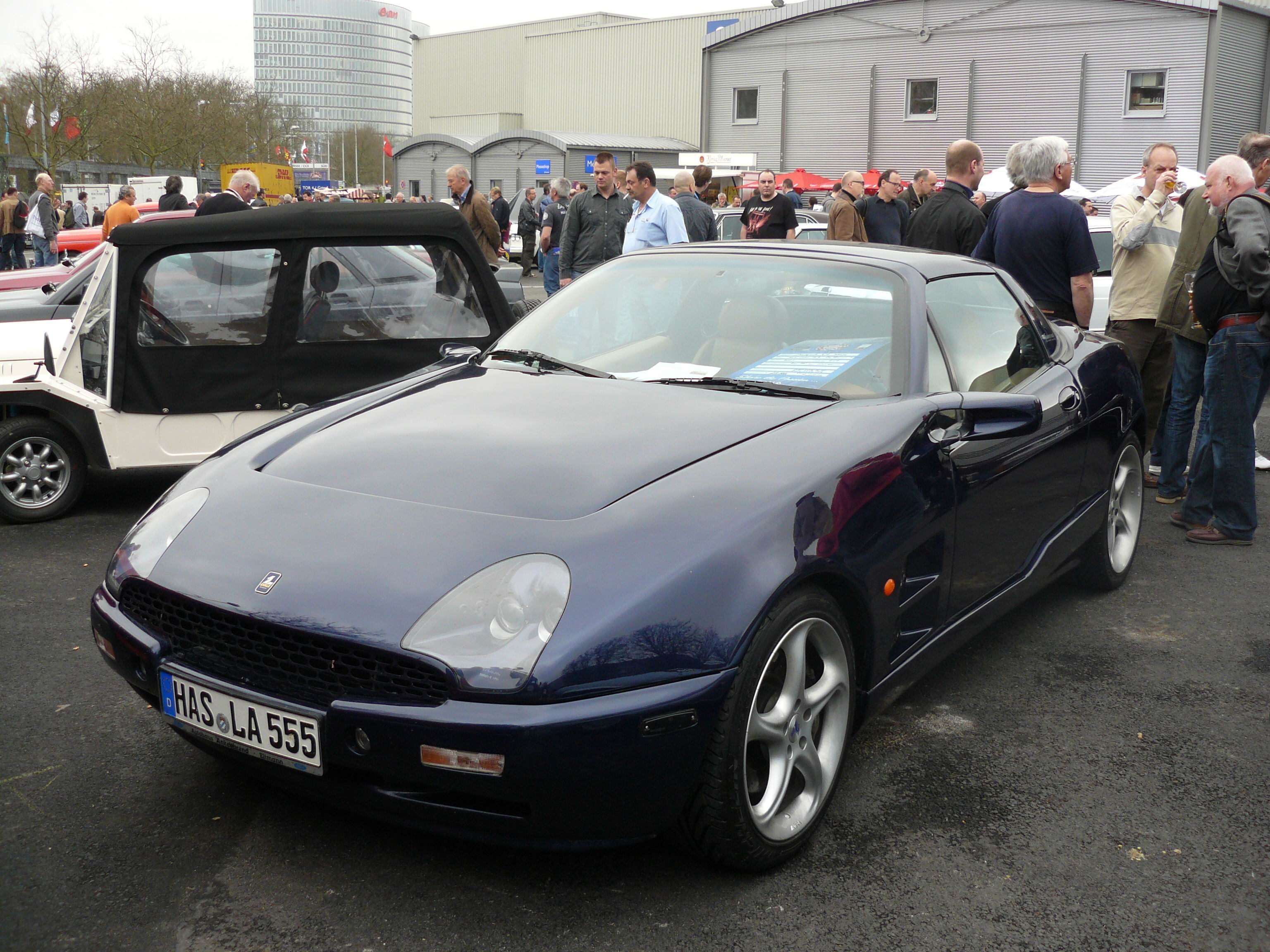
2001 Qvale Mangusta

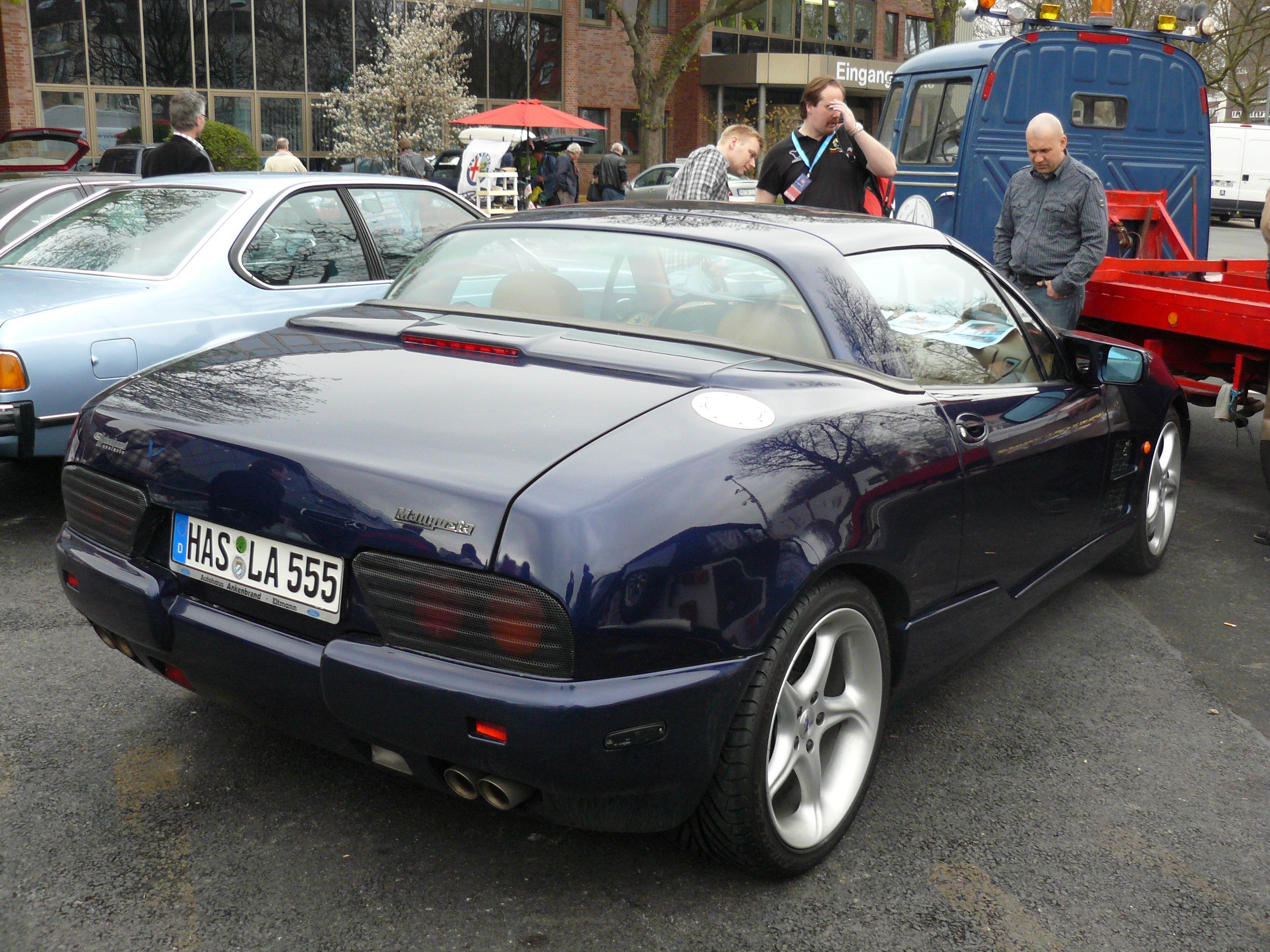
2001 Qvale Mangusta

Alejandro de Tomaso, an Italian car manufacturer with Argentine roots, had chosen the Biguà to revive his brand. The car was designed by Marcello Gandini, a designer for Lamborghini and Maserati. The Biguà was shown for the first time in 1996, in Geneva.

Financial troubles forced De Tomaso to look for a business partner whom he found in the American Bruce Qvale, an importer and distributor of a number of exclusive cars in the United States. The De Tomaso Biguà was renamed the Mangusta, a historic name (see De Tomaso Mangusta).

As the first cars were about to be delivered, Qvale and De Tomaso parted ways. Qvale took over the factory and the car's production. De Tomaso, however, refused to allow the use of his name. The first Mangustas were delivered to their customers with De Tomaso badges, which subsequently had to be exchanged at the dealers for the now-official Qvale logos.

Between 2000 and 2002, Qvale built 284 cars, the majority of which were exported to the USA. The lack of a well-known brand name, the slowing economy, and the unusual design made marketing the car difficult. In 2003, Qvale sold the rights to the Mangusta to Britain's MG Rover Group.

In 2004, MG launched the MG SV and SVR. Designed by MGSR (MG Sport & Racing, the racing division of the MG Rover Group), the SV was based on the structure, suspension, engine and gearbox of the Mangusta. The car was built largely in Italy, with some fitting and pre-delivery customisation in the UK.
