= Chris Neville =

American motorsport announcer

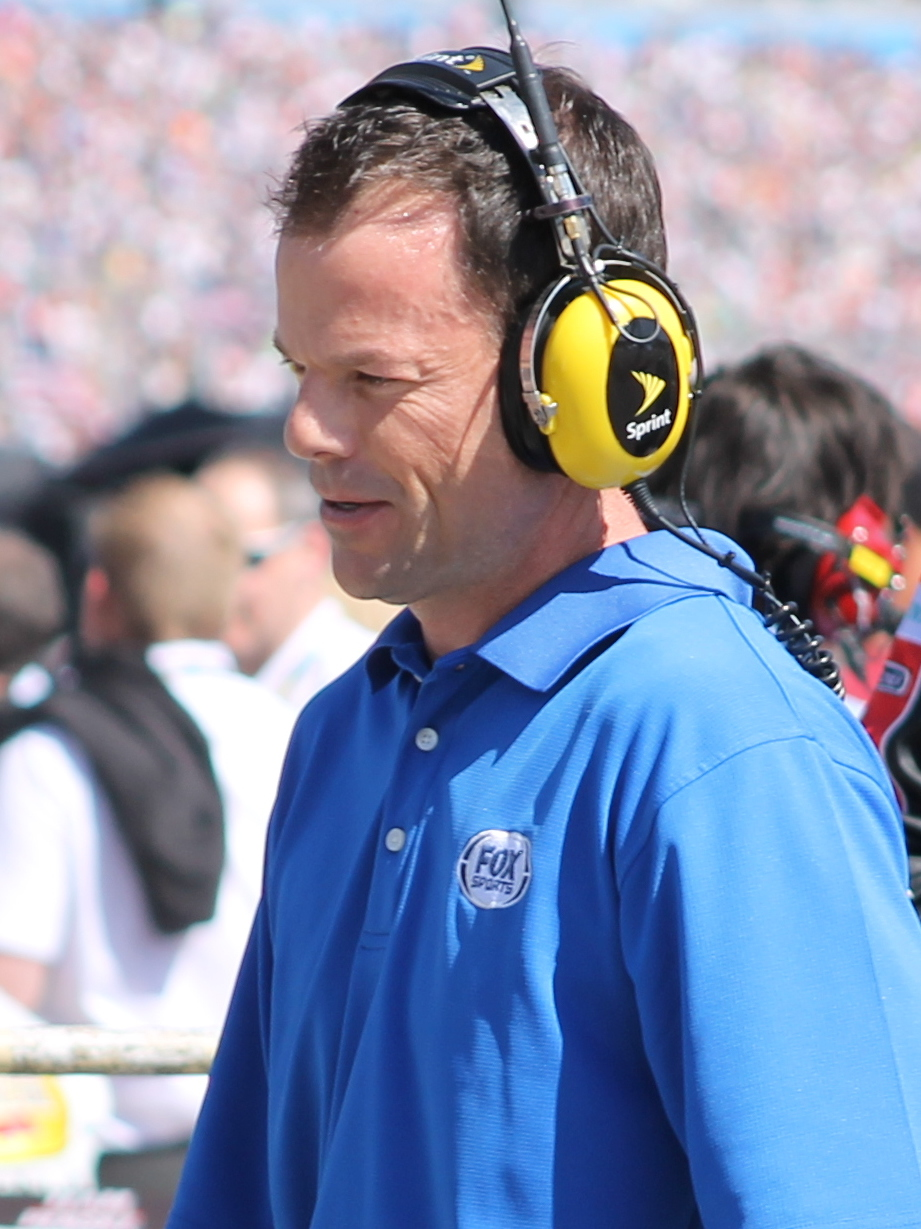
- Neville at Las Vegas Motor Speedway in 2015
- Born: March 22, 1972 (age 54); Elgin, Illinois, United States
- Occupation: NASCAR reporter
- Years active: 2001–current

Chris Neville (born March 22, 1972) is an American NASCAR pit road reporter who most recently worked for Fox Sports. He is best known for his work with Fox, as well as formerly calling the Rolex Sports Car Series on SPEED, NASCAR Sprint Cup Series for NASCAR on TNT, and the IndyCar Series for NBC Sports.

== Biography ==
Neville began racing go karts at 12 years old. He signed up for his first professional event when he was 18. Chris Neville attended Purdue University, where he graduated in 1995. Even while at Purdue, Neville continued to race. He then became an instructor at the Bob Bondurant School of High Performance Driving located in Phoenix, Arizona.

== Racing career ==
In 1998, Neville signed up to race in the SCCA Trans-Am Series where he became Rookie of the Year. He continued to race in the Trans-Am Series until 2000, winning events such as the SPEED World Challenge.

== Broadcasting career ==
In 2001, Neville decided to stop racing and became a pit road reporter for SPEED, bringing knowledge that came from his racing days. He has continued to work on television, moving to NASCAR on TNT and most recently to Fox NASCAR. On November 29, 2017, it was announced that Neville would not be returning as a Fox NASCAR Reporter in 2018.

== Personal life ==
Neville lives in Denver, Colorado with his wife and two daughters. He was elected to the Road Racing Drivers Club in 2011.
