= Qvale Mangusta =

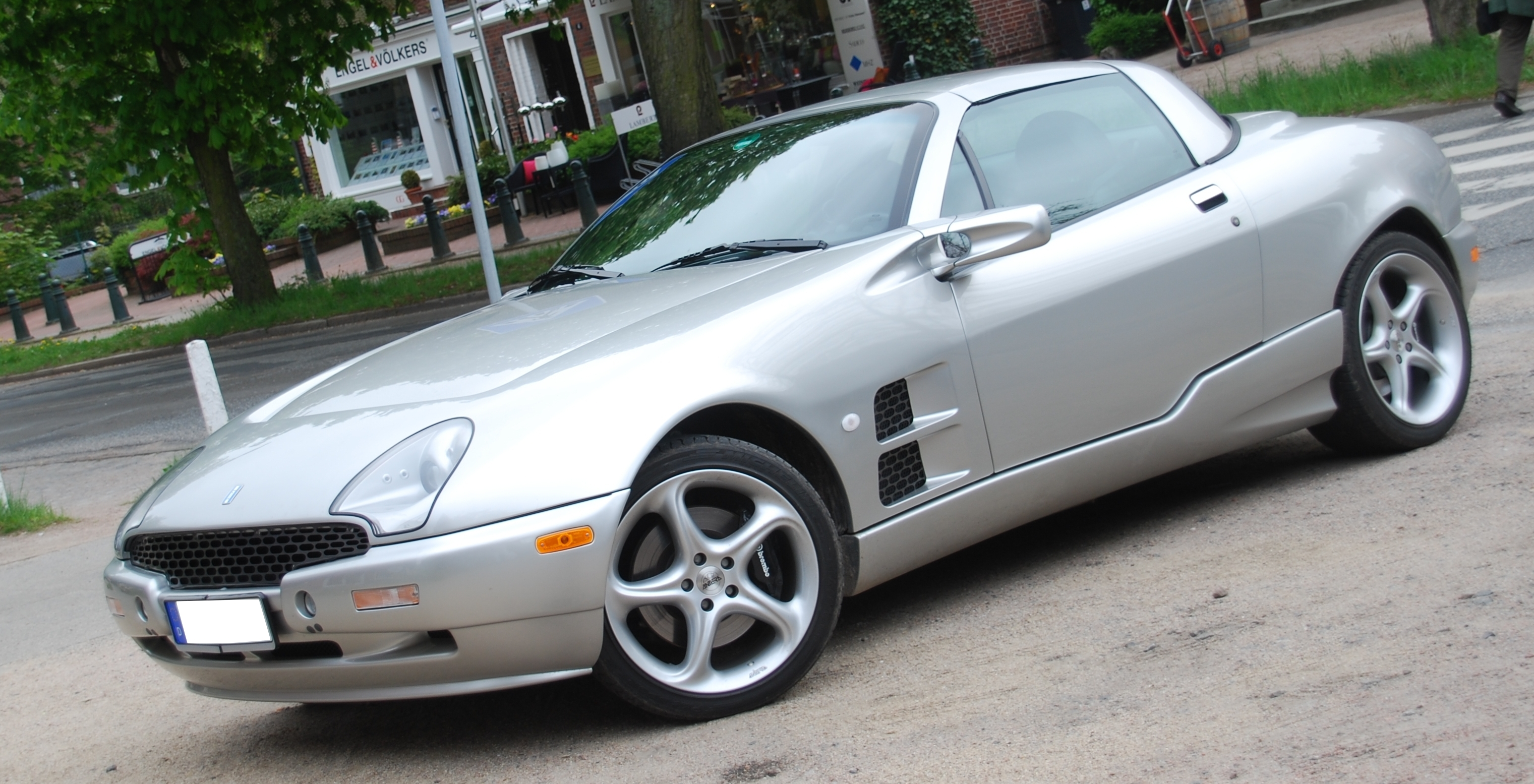

Overview
- Manufacturer: Qvale
- Also called: De Tomaso Biguá
- Production: 1999–2002; 284 produced
- Assembly: Italy: Modena (Qvale Modena S.p.A)
- Designer: Marcello Gandini

Body and chassis
- Class: Sports car (S)
- Body style: 2-door three-position coupe/targa/full convertible
- Layout: Front mid-engine, rear-wheel drive
- Related: MG XPower SV

Powertrain
- Engine: 4.6 L 32-valve DOHC Ford Modular V8
- Transmission: 5-speed BorgWarner T45 manual; 4-speed automatic

Dimensions
- Wheelbase: 2,658 mm (104.6 in)
- Length: 165.1 in (4,194 mm)
- Width: 74.8 in (1,900 mm)
- Height: 51.8 in (1,316 mm)
- Curb weight: 3,351 lb (1,520 kg)

The Qvale Mangusta is a sports car produced in limited numbers by the Italian automaker Qvale between 1999 and 2002. During development and very early production, it was developed from the De Tomaso Biguá concept car shown to the general public at the 1996 Geneva Motor Show. When the car started production, it was renamed De Tomaso Mangusta (named after the car originally built between 1967 and 1971) before De Tomaso became disassociated from the project and all subsequent cars received Qvale badging.

The Mangusta uses a front mid-engine, rear-wheel drive layout and was penned by Italian automotive designer Marcello Gandini. Its powertrain, technical basis and components were largely provided by American manufacturer Ford Motor Company. It is powered by a 4.6 L DOHC Ford modular V8 engine and was offered with either a 5-speed manual transmission supplied by BorgWarner, or a 4-speed automatic transmission.

== History ==
In 1993 and 1994, Maserati technical director Giordano Casarini made a number of business trips to the United Kingdom and, while there, first saw the TVR Griffith. He was impressed by the style and sales success of such a low-production-volume car.

Alejandro de Tomaso had meanwhile suffered a stroke in 1993. After a period of recovery, de Tomaso asked Casarini (whom he considered a trusted friend) what should be done with the De Tomaso company. Casarini suggested that De Tomaso make "an Italian TVR", pointing out the positive design elements that made the Griffith attractive. Alejandro de Tomaso negotiated with the Maserati chairman to release Casarini to De Tomaso, so that work on the design could begin.

Casarini intended to use an existing, inexpensive V8 engine that would reduce the purchase and maintenance costs of the car. In the tradition of De Tomaso cars, he wished to use a Ford V8 and explored the possibility of using the new Ford Modular 4.6 L V8, but discovered that Ford was not yet ready to sell it to manufacturers.

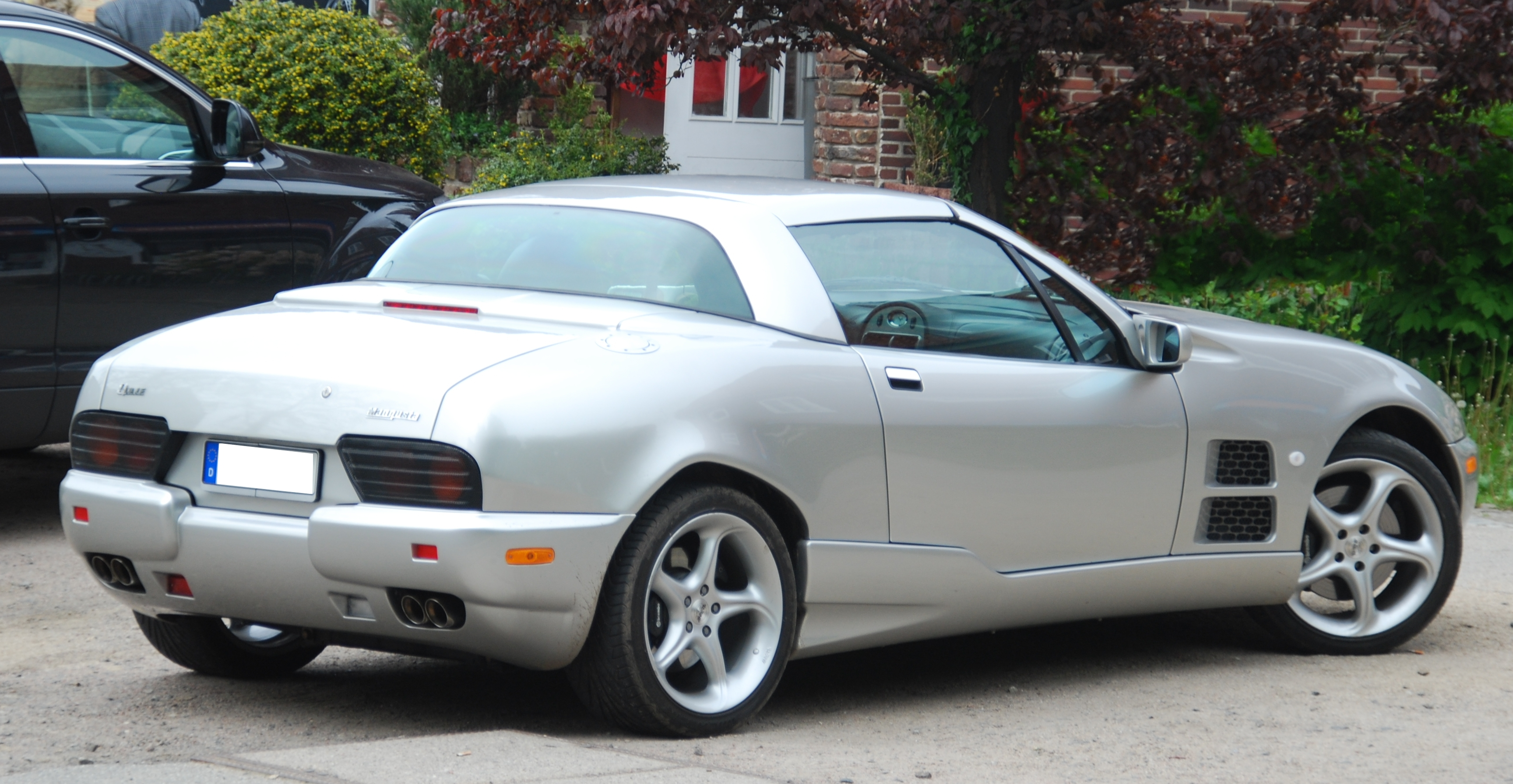
Rear view

Casarini learned that TVR was investigating the possibility of using differentials made by Australian company BTR Automotive in its cars. When communicating with a supplier for the differentials, he was directed towards Holden Special Vehicles (HSV), who indicated that they would be able to offer engines and transmissions. At this stage, the De Tomaso project was given the internal code name "ETX".

Soon after Casarini's communications with HSV, Ford Motor Company contacted him with the news that they would indeed be able to supply the Modular V8, along with transmissions, ancillaries, and electrical systems.

Alejandro de Tomaso had been a fan of the design work done by Marcello Gandini, so Gandini was called to Modena to discuss the job of styling the new De Tomaso project. To show him the character and feel of the desired product, Gandini was driven around in a TVR Griffith. He was ultimately commissioned for the styling job, and was given the instruction that the folding roof mechanism on the De Tomaso be similar to the multi-position roof used by the Griffith.

A prototype of the car was displayed at the 1996 Geneva Motor Show and was called the De Tomaso Biguà, though it still needed development before it would reach full production. The company required capital to continue, and an initial appeal to the Italian government failed due to the declining health of Alejandro de Tomaso. Eventually, the company approached the Qvale family, who, led by Kjell Qvale, had been a North American importer for the original De Tomaso Mangusta in the 1960s and later Maserati when it was under De Tomaso ownership. Qvale agreed to fund the development of the car, with the agreement that the final product would be sold under the De Tomaso brand, as the De Tomaso Mangusta. The agreement between De Tomaso and Qvale was soured over licensing and distribution issues. Bruce Qvale, who was managing Qvale at the time decided to produce the car under the Qvale name after an investment of over US$30 million on the development of the car.

In 1997, the Qvale Modena SpA company was established to produce the Mangusta. Bruce Qvale led the project of developing a production facility, which involved the renovation and modernization of a building in Modena. The building was "elegantly and comprehensively furnished, [with] marble everywhere", and certified ISO 9001 compliant.

== Design and technology ==
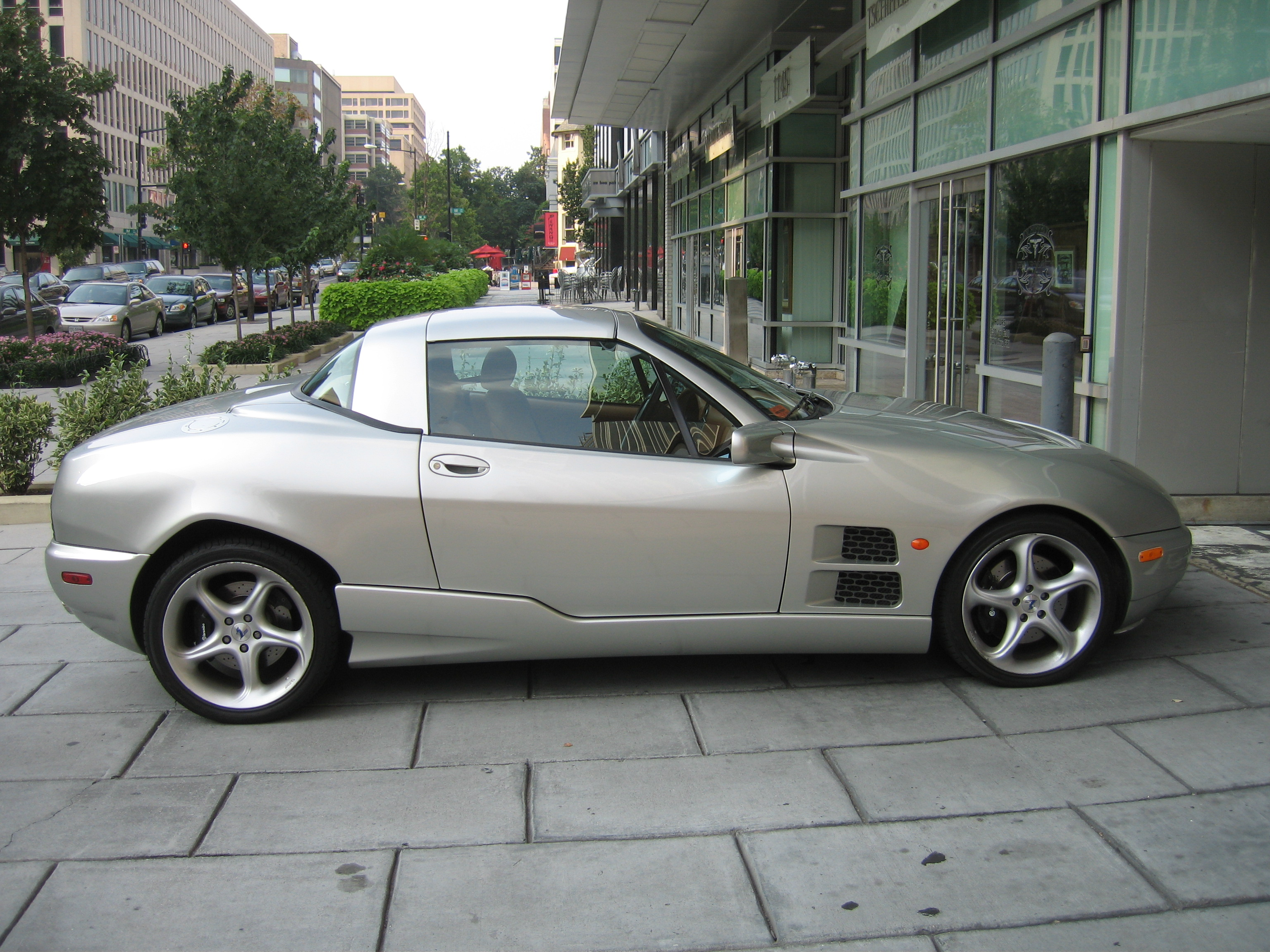
The Mangusta with its roof in the closed position

The chassis of the Mangusta was designed by former Formula 1 designer Enrique Scalabroni, who had worked for Dallara, Williams F1, and Scuderia Ferrari. Each chassis is formed of welded laser-cut steel sections, and was then galvanized by Vaccari & Bosi. Body panels were constructed of resin transfer moulding (RTM) plastic by Stratime Cappelo Systems of Villers-Cotterêts, France; this same company had provided bodywork using the RTM technology for the Alfa Romeo SZ and the Lotus Elan M100. The panels were then painted by Italian company Rovercoat SpA before they were fitted to a car.

The first simple mock-up of the chassis design was done by Casarini and Scalabroni assembling pieces of packing cardboard to show the basic layout. Scalabroni placed emphasis on high torsional rigidity of the chassis, which was particularly important as the final design would not have a structural roof. The design also emphasized safety: significant impact energy during a front-end collision is dissipated by lateral movement of the engine. In tests, the Mangusta chassis showed a torsional stiffness of 1450 kg/m/deg, which was more than four times the typical stiffness of an open car at the time. Both the front and rear suspension on the Mangusta uses double wishbones with coil springs and anti-roll bars.

The Mangusta uses a unique roof mechanism referred to as the "roto-top", designed by Gandini and inspired by the folding roof of the TVR Griffith. The roto-top features a center removable panel (similar to normal targa configurations) but also allows the rear section to electrically rotate (on a forward pivot) out of sight into a cavity behind the seats. This transforms the car into a full convertible.

The Mangusta shares its powertrain (engine and transmission) with the Ford Mustang SVT Cobra.

In the Mangusta's interior, most visible surfaces are covered in leather. Visteon Automotive Systems was selected as the supplier for the interior electrical systems. In order to save maintenance costs, the interior shares many parts with the Ford Mustang. The alloy wheels for the Mangusta were produced by Antera.

When the Mangusta was transitioned from a prototype to production model, Carlo Gaino of Synthesis Design was contracted to perform any necessary adjustments to the design. Synthesis Design developed two cars: one was the restyling of the production car, the other an evolution based on the reduction of production costs.

== Production and launch ==
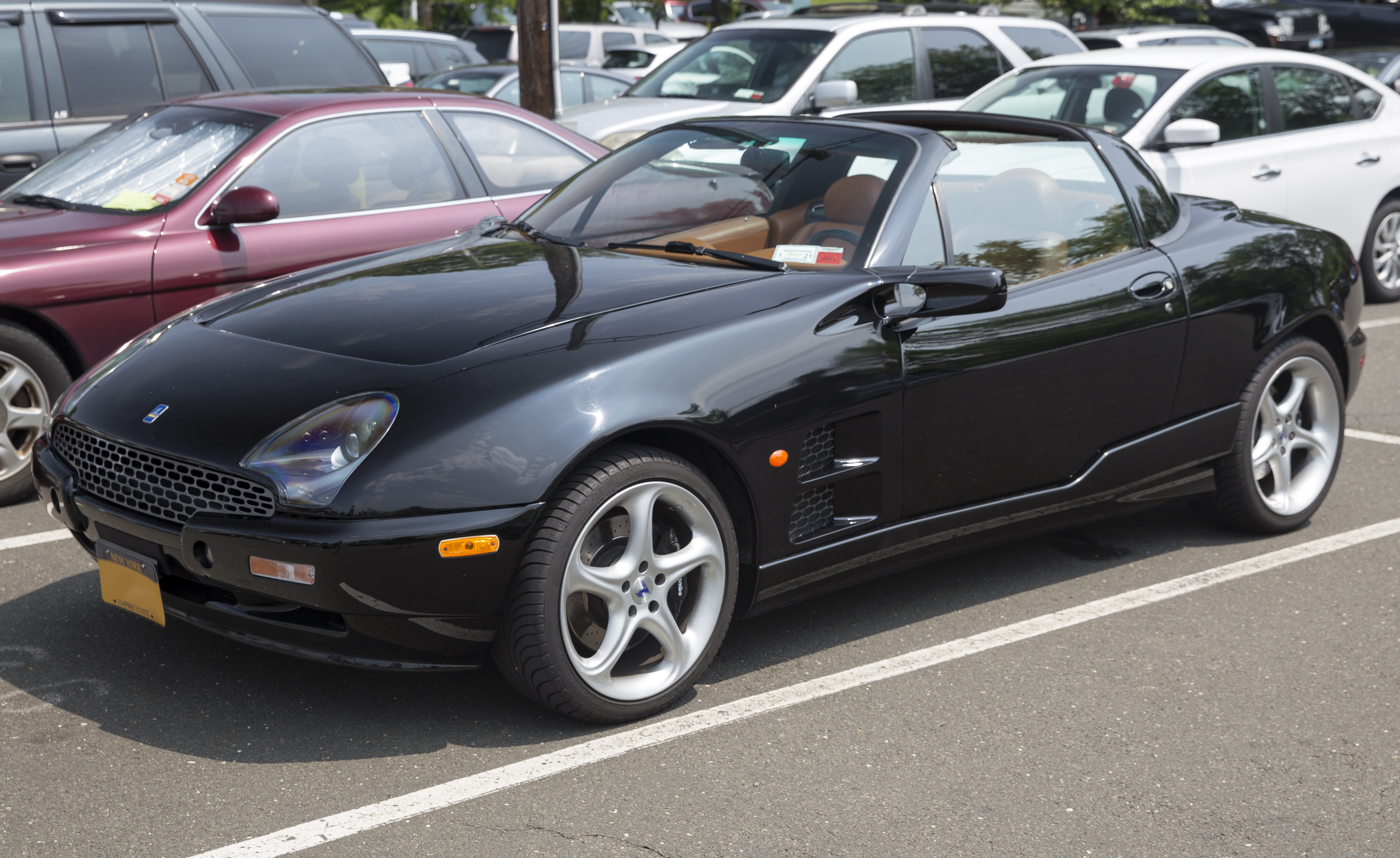
2001 Qvale Mangusta

The first De Tomaso Mangusta was completed on November 10, 1999. On January 6, 2000, at the Los Angeles Motor Show, Bruce Qvale announced the return of the De Tomaso brand to North America with the new Mangusta. Also announced was the Mangusta's entry into racing, with Qvale Motorsports entering a car sponsored by Tommy Bahama into the BF Goodrich Tires Trans-Am Series. Brian Simo and Qvale founder Bruce Qvale competed, with Simo winning the title by 12 points. The Mangusta went on sale for US$78,900 on January 20, 2000, with a single ordering option of 18-inch alloy wheels.

As the Mangusta was being launched, Alejandro de Tomaso was independently pursuing another design project (which was to recycle the De Tomaso Pantera name). Because the De Tomaso company was being financially supported by Qvale at the time, this caused disharmony between Qvale and de Tomaso that ultimately resulted in the decision to discontinue their cooperation on the project. The De Tomaso Mangusta was renamed the "Qvale Mangusta", and production continued.

Twenty-nine cars were manufactured for the purpose of crash-testing and homologation. Also, a partially completed right-hand-drive Qvale Mangusta was shown at the British Motor Show in October 2000 and was later sold as street legal in Europe. Eighteen cars were sold new in Europe. Overall, 284 cars were sold.

== Reception ==
Automotive journalists and testers praised the car for its performance and handling, and for the utility of the roto-top. Some build quality issues were noted on early cars, and the reaction to the unconventional styling was mixed.

Lackluster sales figures in 2000 prompted Qvale to reduce the price of model year 2001 cars by nearly 10,000 USD, which the company announced on October 13, 2000.

== Connection with MG ==
In the summer of 2000, after BMW had sold the MG Rover Group to the Phoenix Consortium, Bruce Qvale contacted one of the Consortium directors, Nick Stephenson, and proposed forming a European distribution deal for the Qvale Mangusta. Soon after, Stephenson and his colleagues began to consider the possibility of using the Mangusta platform to develop a high-performance halo car to grow the MG brand.

On February 28, 2001, Stephenson and his colleague Peter Beale began negotiations with Qvale Modena to purchase Mangusta production assets. A contract was drawn, and on June 19 of that year, the announcement was made that the deal was complete (with account reports indicating that the price was £7 million).

Under the MG Rover group, the Qvale Mangusta platform was developed into the MG XPower SV.

== Specifications ==
- Layout - Front mid-engine, rear-wheel drive
- Top speed - 160 mph (257 km/h) (manual transmission); 155.4 mph (250 km/h) (automatic transmission)
- Acceleration - 0-60 mph: 5.3 seconds
- Engine displacement - 4,601 cc
- Engine type - Ford Motor Company Naturally aspirated aluminum DOHC 4-valve V8 with 9.8:1 compression
- Peak power - 320 hp (239 kW; 324 PS) at 6,000 rpm
- Peak torque - 314 lb⋅ft (426 N⋅m) at 4,800 rpm
- Transmission - BorgWarner T45 5-speed manual, 4-speed automatic transmission (optional)
- Brakes - Brembo ventilated discs on all wheels with ABS and traction control
- Suspension - double wishbones, coil springs (front and rear)
- Steering - power assisted rack and pinion

== Options ==
- Available exterior colors
  - Silver grey metallic
  - Mangusta green metallic
  - Santorini blue pearlescent
  - Corallo red pearlescent
  - Tigre yellow
  - Midnight black
- Available interior colors
  - Black
  - Tobacco
  - Cappuccino
