= Rover 10 =

Rover Ten
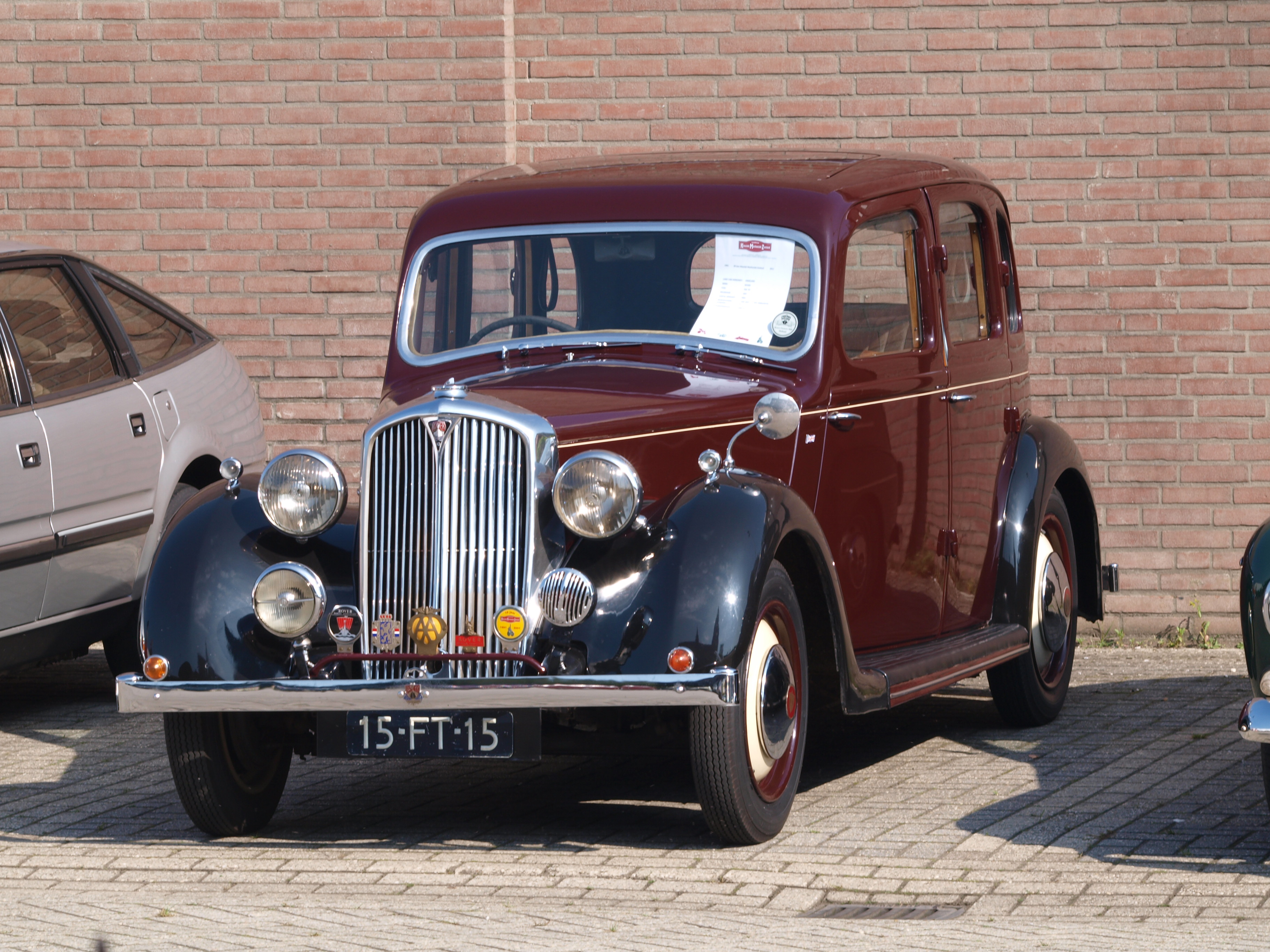
- 1947 Ten six-light saloon P2

Overview
- Manufacturer: Rover
- Production: 1927–1947

Powertrain
- Engine: straight 4

Chronology
- Predecessor: Rover 9/20
- Successor: Rover P3

The Rover 10 was a small family car from the British Rover car company produced between 1927 and 1947.

== 10/25 ==
Rover 10/25 Rover Family Ten
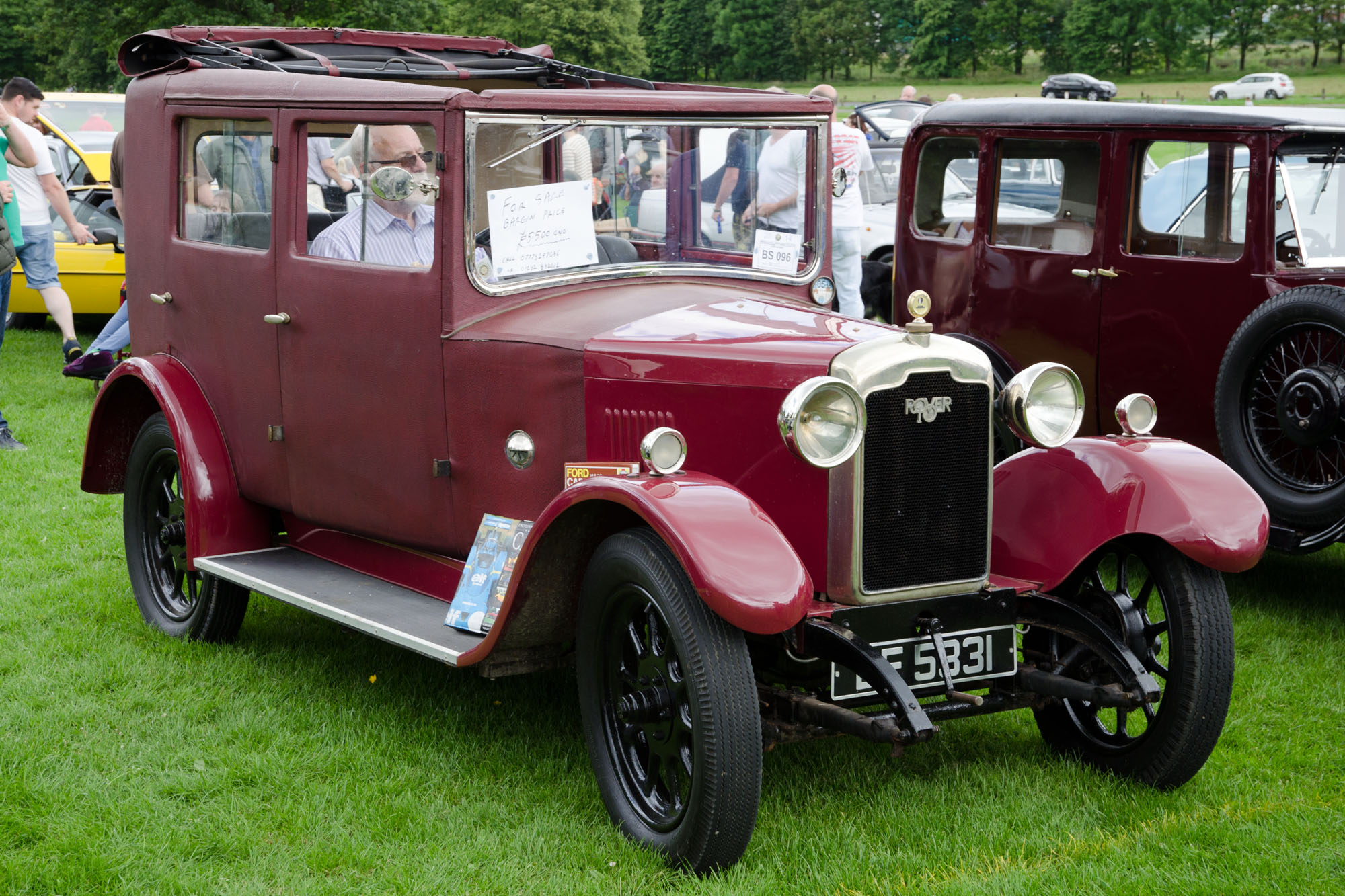
- Weymann 4-door sports saloon with Riviera folding roof registered July 1928

Overview
- Manufacturer: Rover at Tyseley
- Production: 1927–1933 15,000 approx made

Body and chassis
- Body style: open 2-seater; open 4-seater tourer; Weymann saloon; open 2-seater semi-sports; open 4-seater semi-sports; chassis only

Powertrain
- Engine: 1185 cc ohv straight 4
- Transmission: dry plate clutch; gearbox 3-speeds and reverse with central control, enclosed drive shaft, worm final drive

Dimensions
- Wheelbase: 104 in (2,642 mm); Track 48 in (1,219 mm); Track 50 in (1,270 mm)
- Length: 156 in (3,962 mm) without bumpers
- Width: 62 in (1,575 mm)

Chronology
- Predecessor: Rover 9/20

Rover 10/25

Overview
- Manufacturer: Rover

Layout
- Configuration: straight four
- Displacement: 1,185 cc (72 cu in)
- Cylinder bore: 63 mm (2.5 in)
- Piston stroke: 95 mm (3.7 in)
- Cylinder head material: aluminium alloy crankcase
- Valvetrain: overhead valves by Duralumin pushrods, chain-driven camshaft

Combustion
- Oil system: forced lubrication by a gear pump in the sump
- Cooling system: water pumped through radiator, no fan

Output
- Power output: 25 bhp (19 kW; 25 PS); Tax horsepower 9.84

Chronology
- Predecessor: Rover 9/20
- Successor: Rover 10

The Rover 10/25 was a small car built by Rover from mid 1927. Some time between March and September 1927 Rover increased the bore of their 9/20hp by 3 mm and renamed the model 10/25 hp to indicate the engine's 10 per cent increased capacity but 25 per cent increase in claimed output. The drive shaft was also enclosed. The Rover 9/20 remained available in showrooms.

=== Chassis ===
With the Rover 8 and Rover 9/20 chassis and enlarged 9/20 engine the 10/25 chassis was conventional with rigid axles and leaf spring suspension all round, half elliptic at the front and quarter elliptic behind. The four cylinder, overhead valve engine's capacity had been increased by ten per cent to 1185 cc. Drive was to the rear wheels through a three speed gearbox. There were internally expanding brakes on all four wheels. Its magneto ignition was replaced by coil ignition in 1929.

==== Weymann body ====
Available bodies either 2-seater or 4-seater were: open tourer or semi-sports tourer or as a 4-seater saloon.

The 4-seater saloons were provided with a Weymann fabric body built by Rover under licence at Parkside. A standard Paris body with a folding roof was rebranded Riviera. The saloon windows were given double sliding panels for ventilation.

Equipment in the Paris body included: leather upholstery, five lamps, two electric horns, eight-day clock, automatic screen wiper, roof ventilator and lamp, companions, rear blind controllable from the driver’s seat, folding luggage grid etc. The Riviera model had the same fittings but in addition the roof was flexible. It folded back like an ordinary hood over about two-thirds of its length.

In October 1928 the bonnet was lengthened and a Weymann Sportsman's Coupé was added to the range. Seating four it had two 40 inch doors.

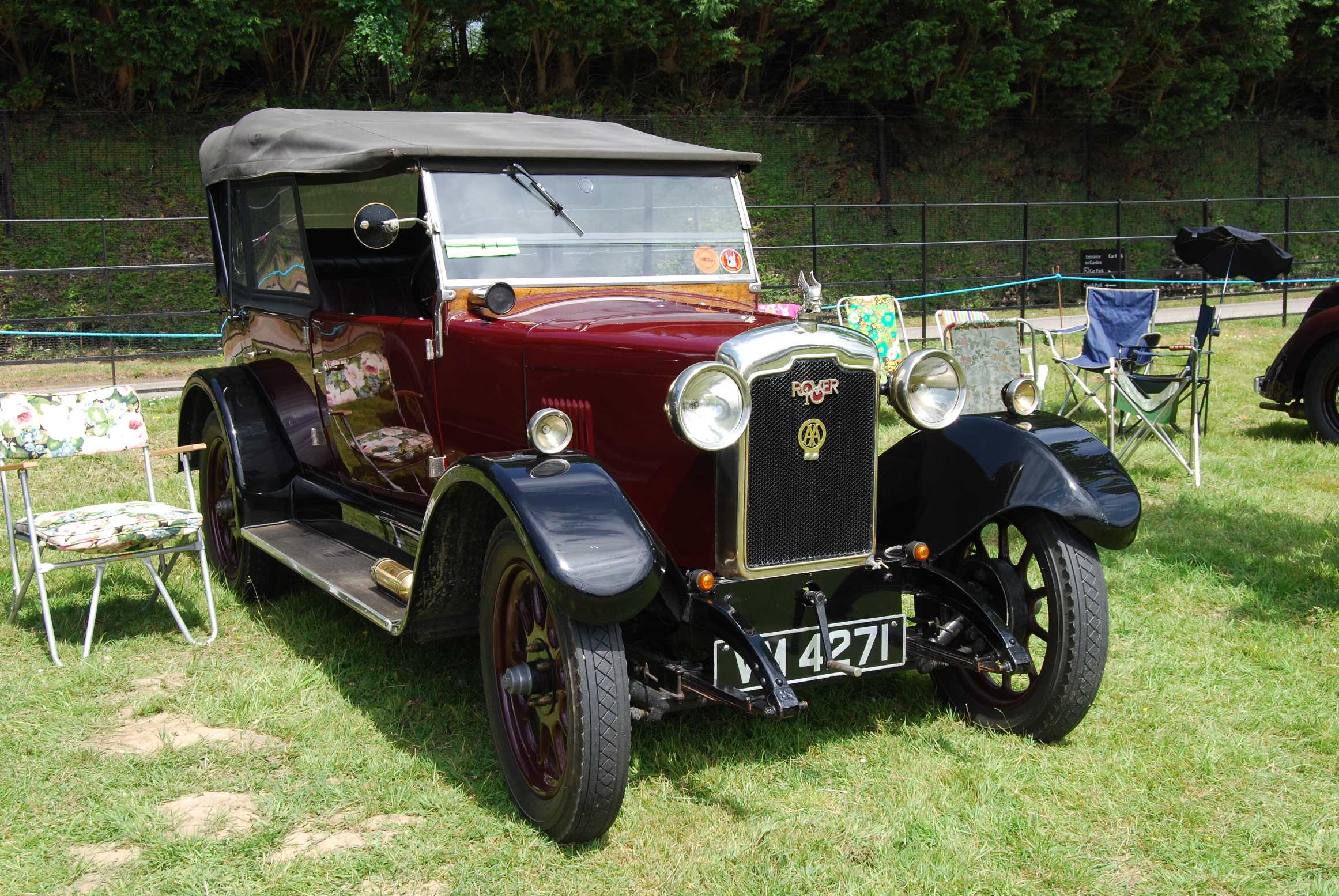
1928 open 4-seater tourer

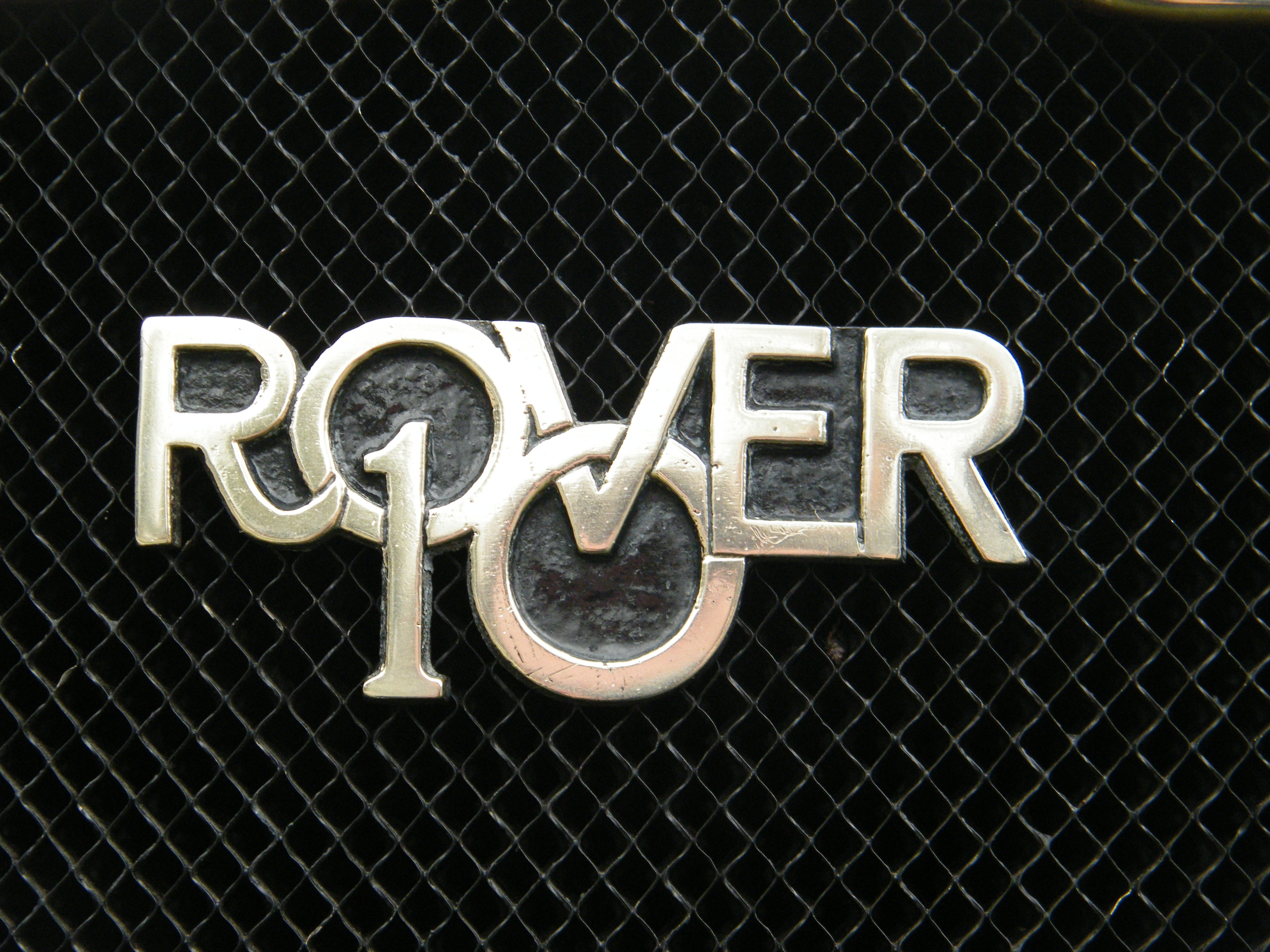

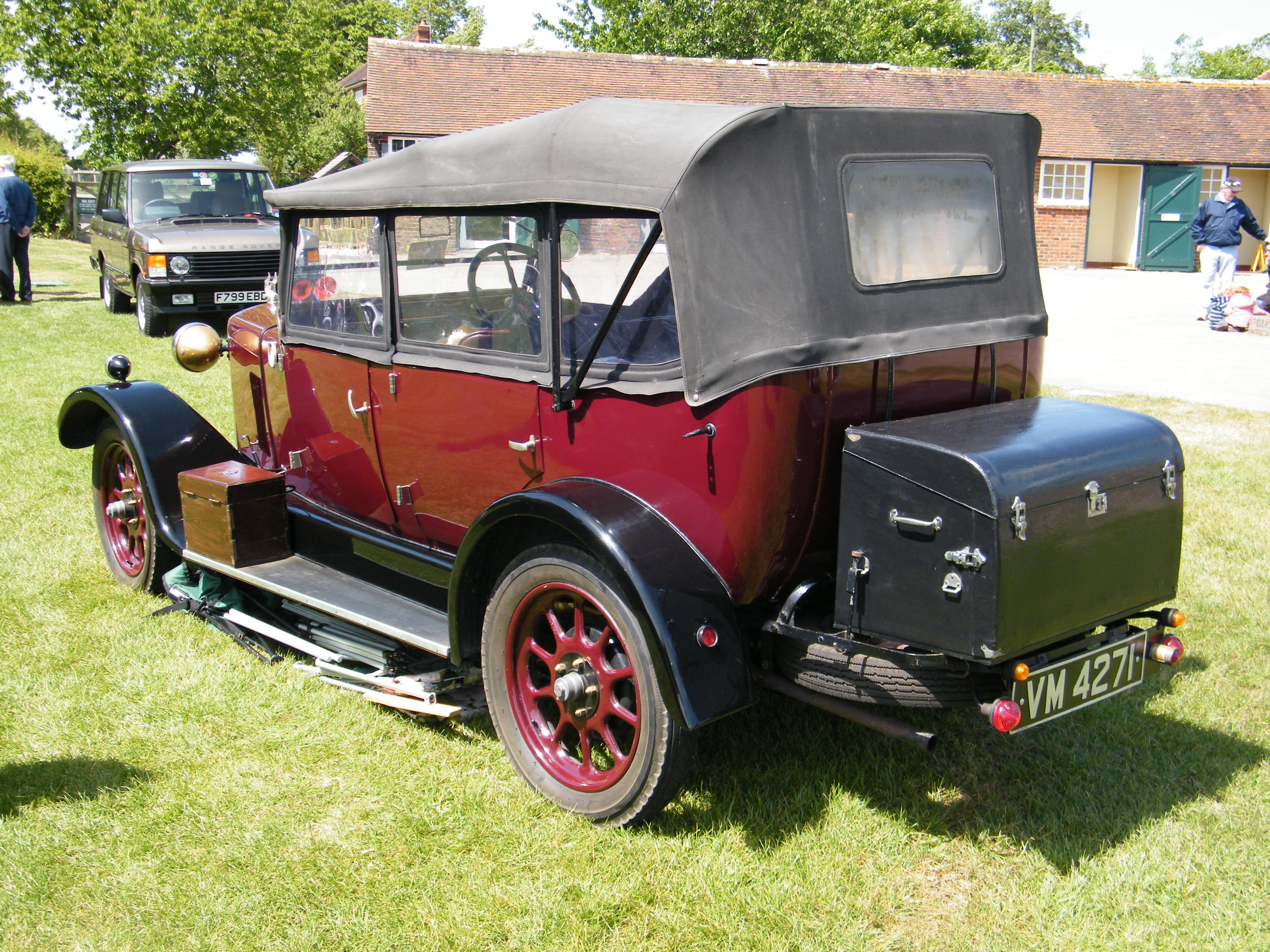

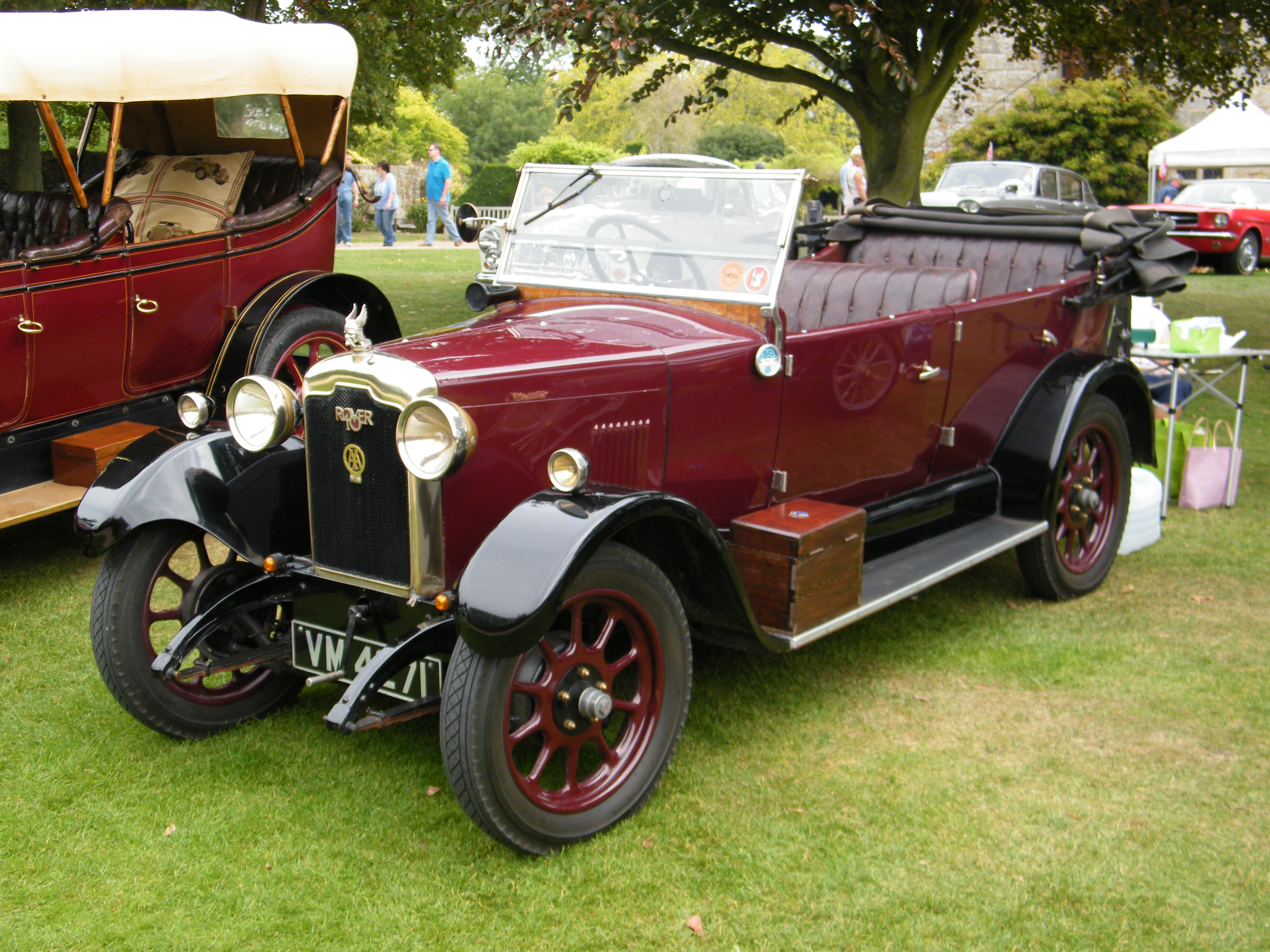

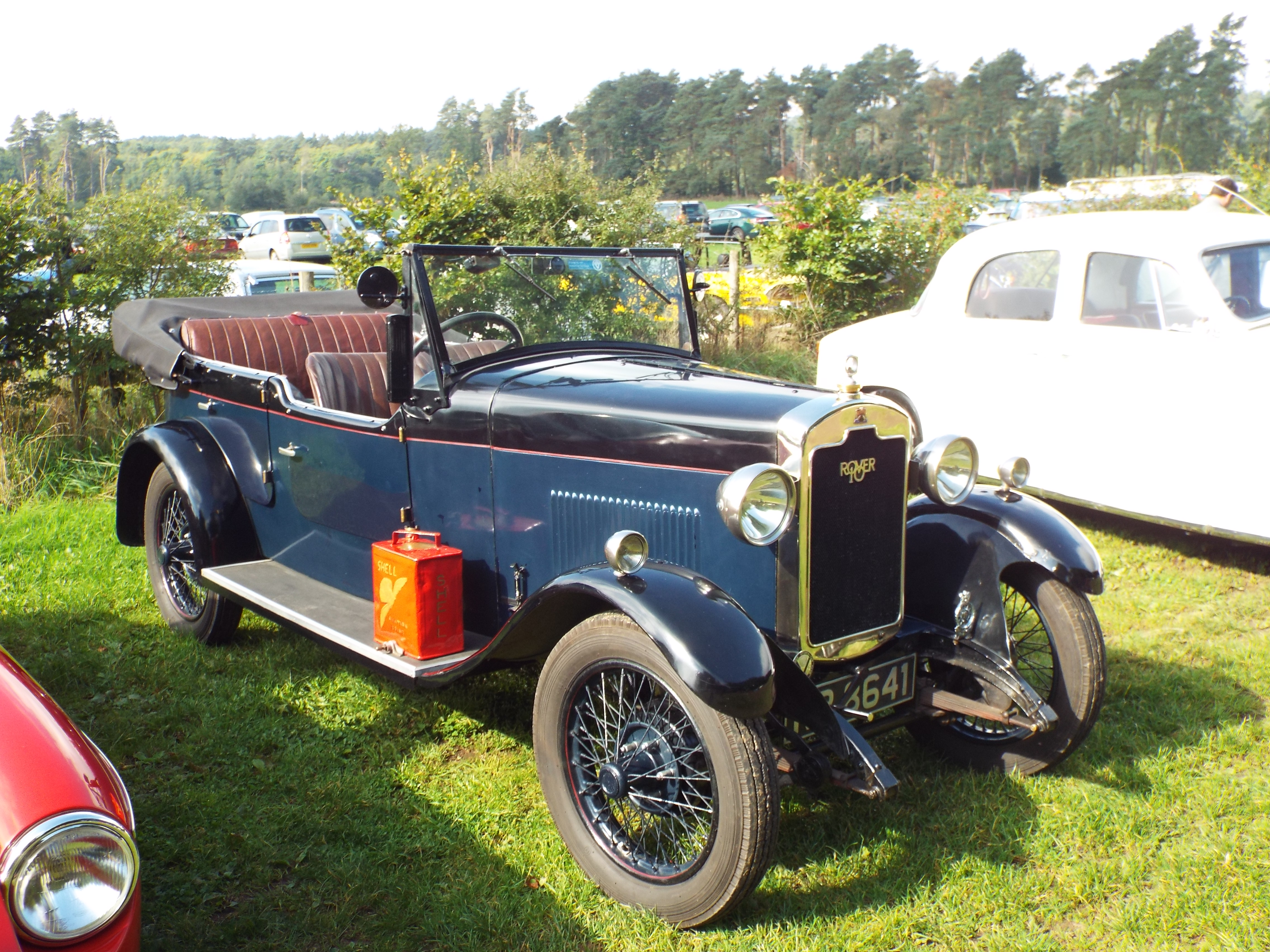
1928 open 4-seater Sports tourer

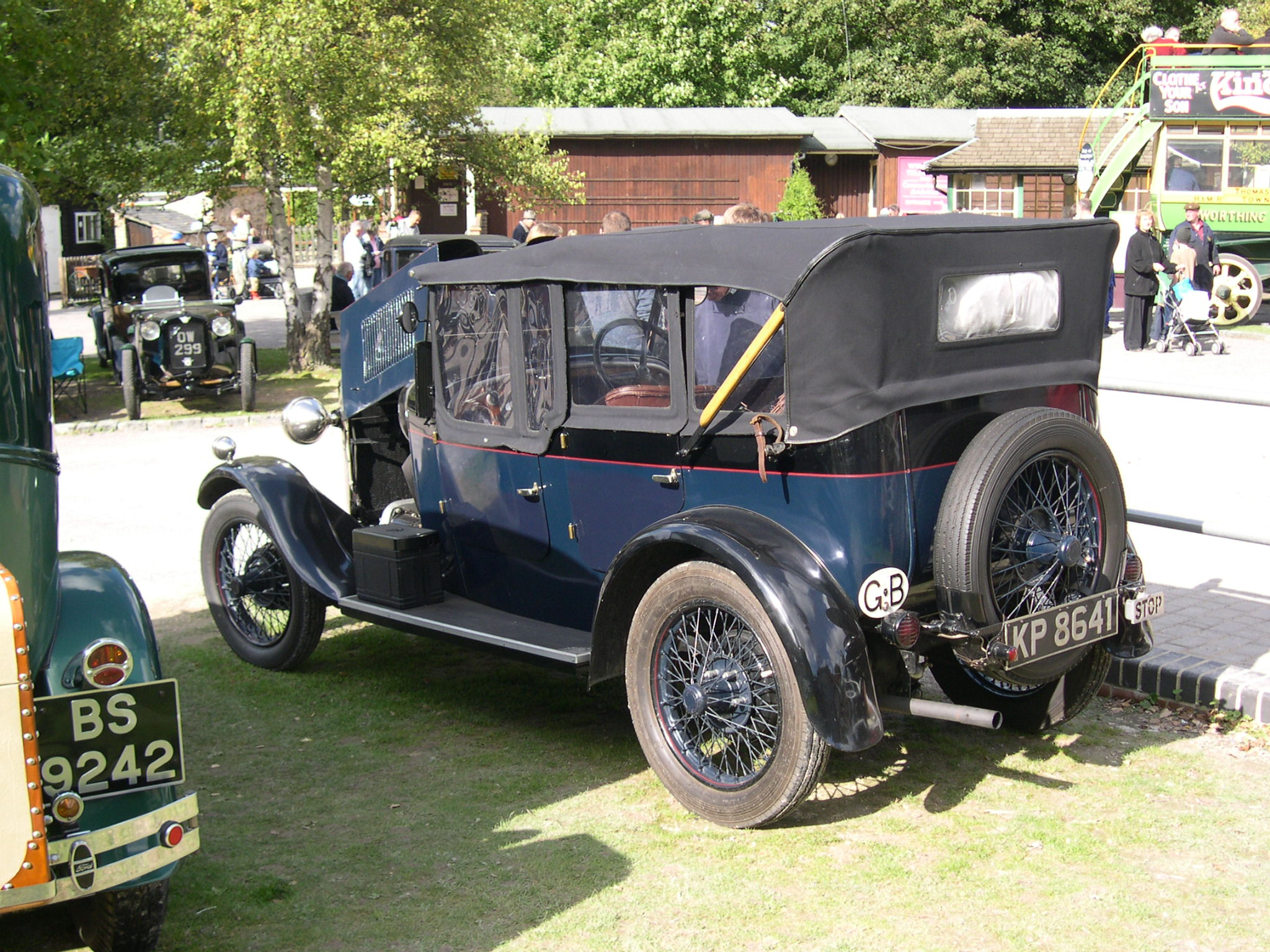

A high-line Regal model available on all bodies was introduced in 1928. Priced at a 12 per cent premium it came with a sliding roof, bumpers (buffers) front and rear, safety glass, vacuum servo braking, two spare wheels and special mats.

==== All-steel body ====
The existing Weymann bodied Riviera and Sportsman's Coupé models were joined in August 1930 by a "coachbuilt" model. Pressed Steel supplied these all-steel bodies to Rover, painted and trimmed, for a much lower price than the cost of Rover's in-house Weymann bodies but Rover charged the same price for the three models fully equipped with safety glass windscreen, an electric windscreen wiper and a luggage grid. The bodies were new, roomier and they had a new shape. Wire wheels were £5 extra.

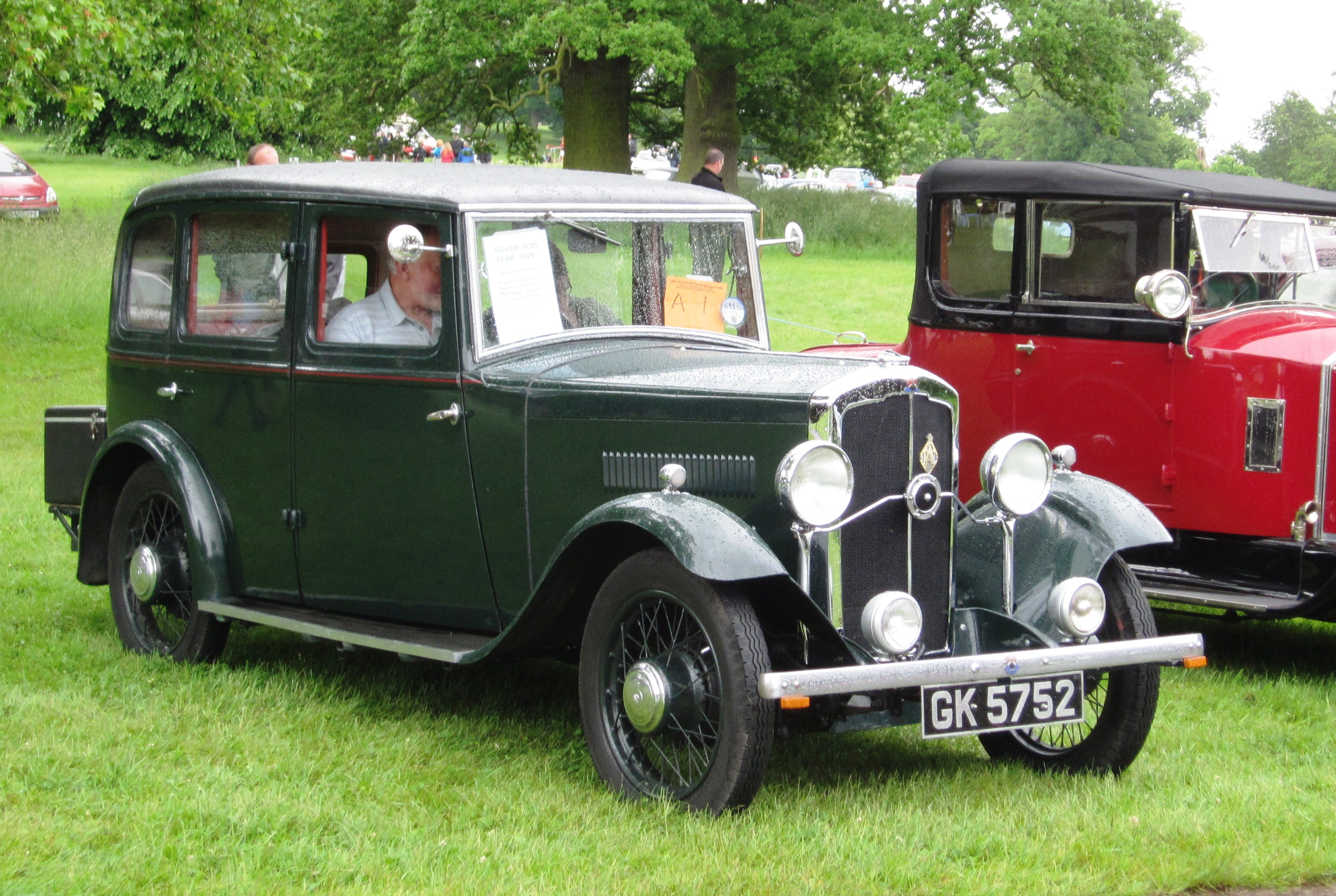
1931 10/25 Regal 6-light saloon. The chromed disc between headlamps is an electric horn fitted to all 1931 Rovers

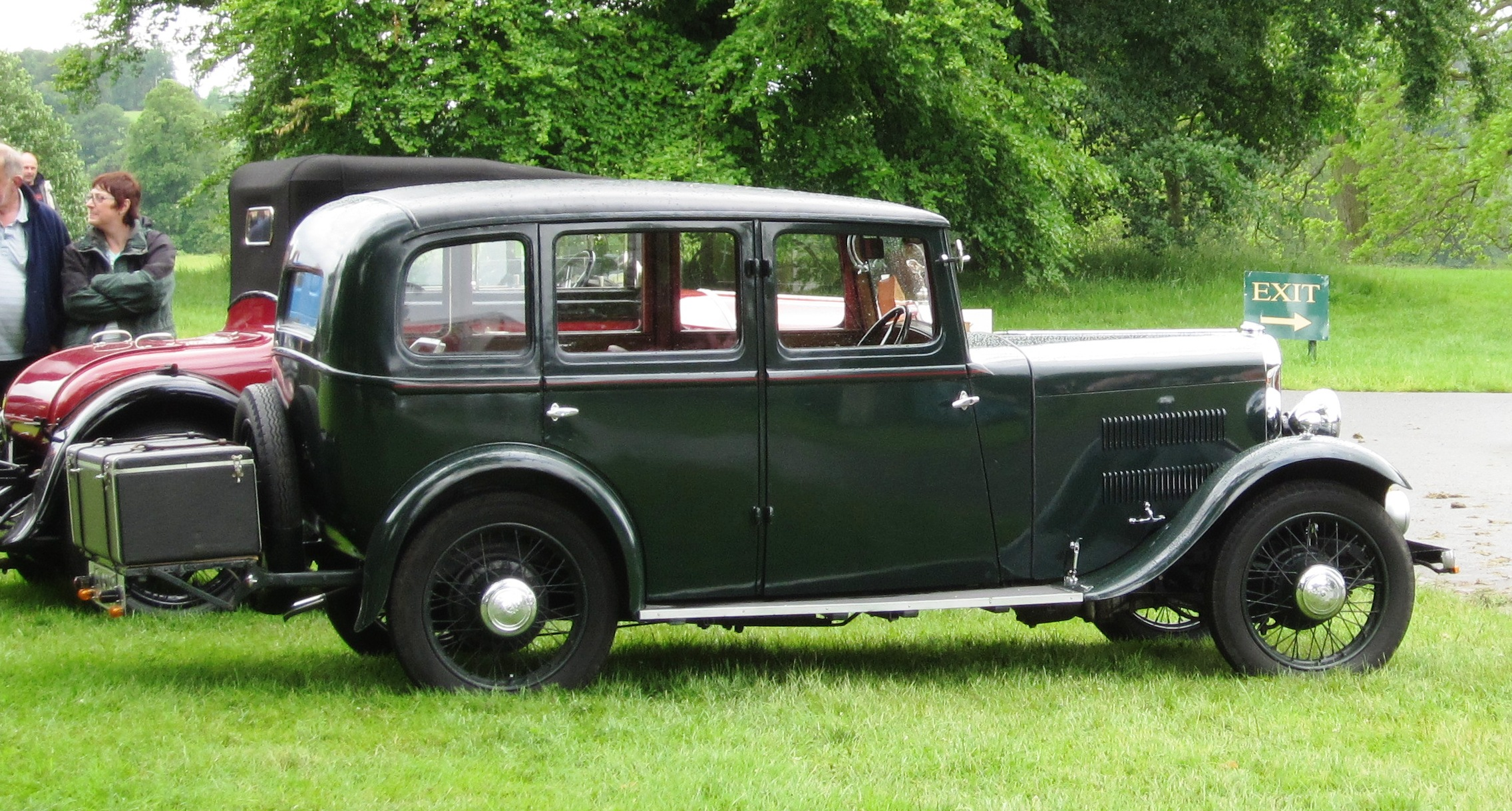
Regal profile Magna wheels, bumpers, pressed steel body by Pressed Steel. A grille of shutter-type stone guards protects the radiator

Unacknowledged relatives

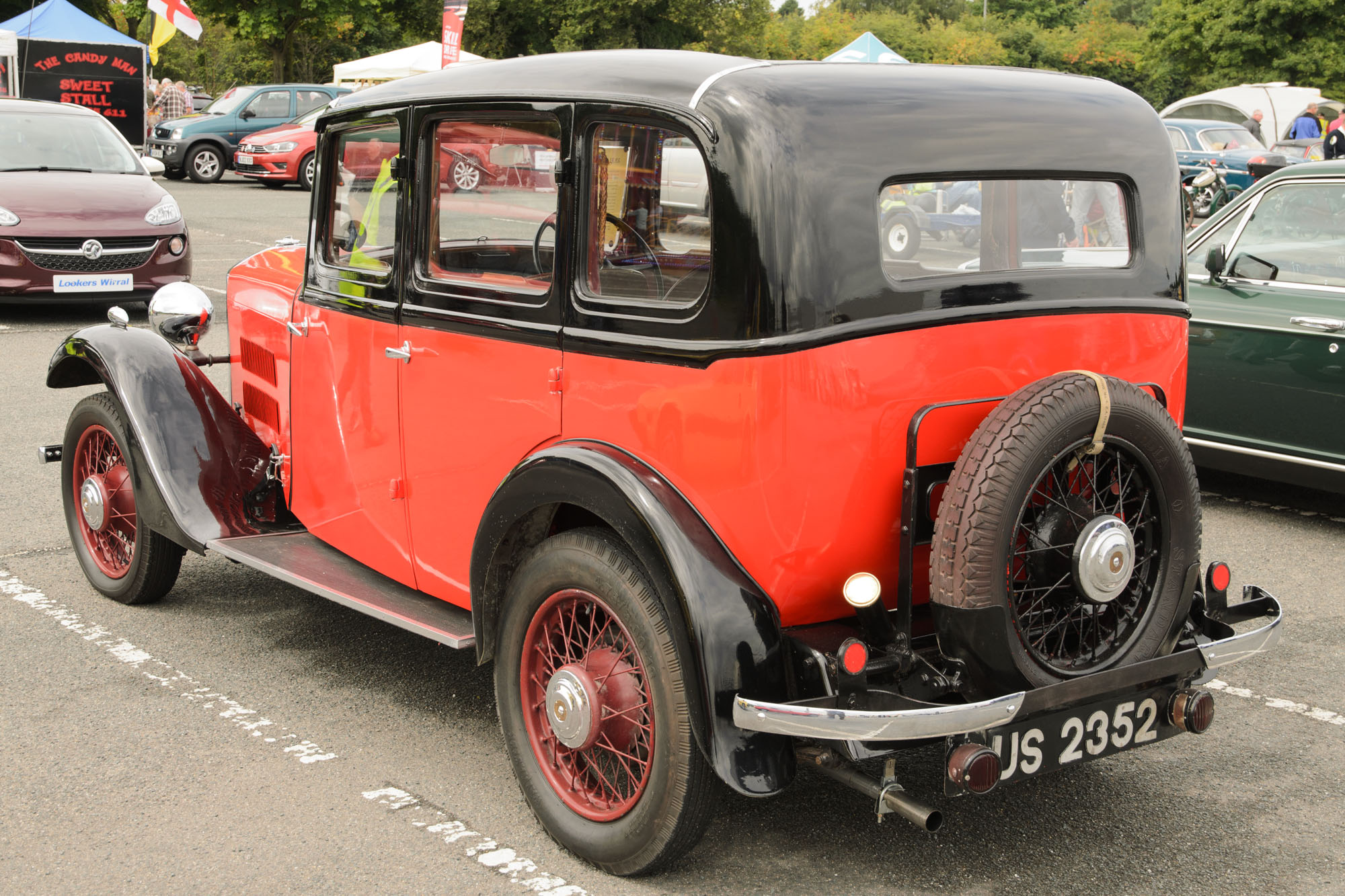
Rover

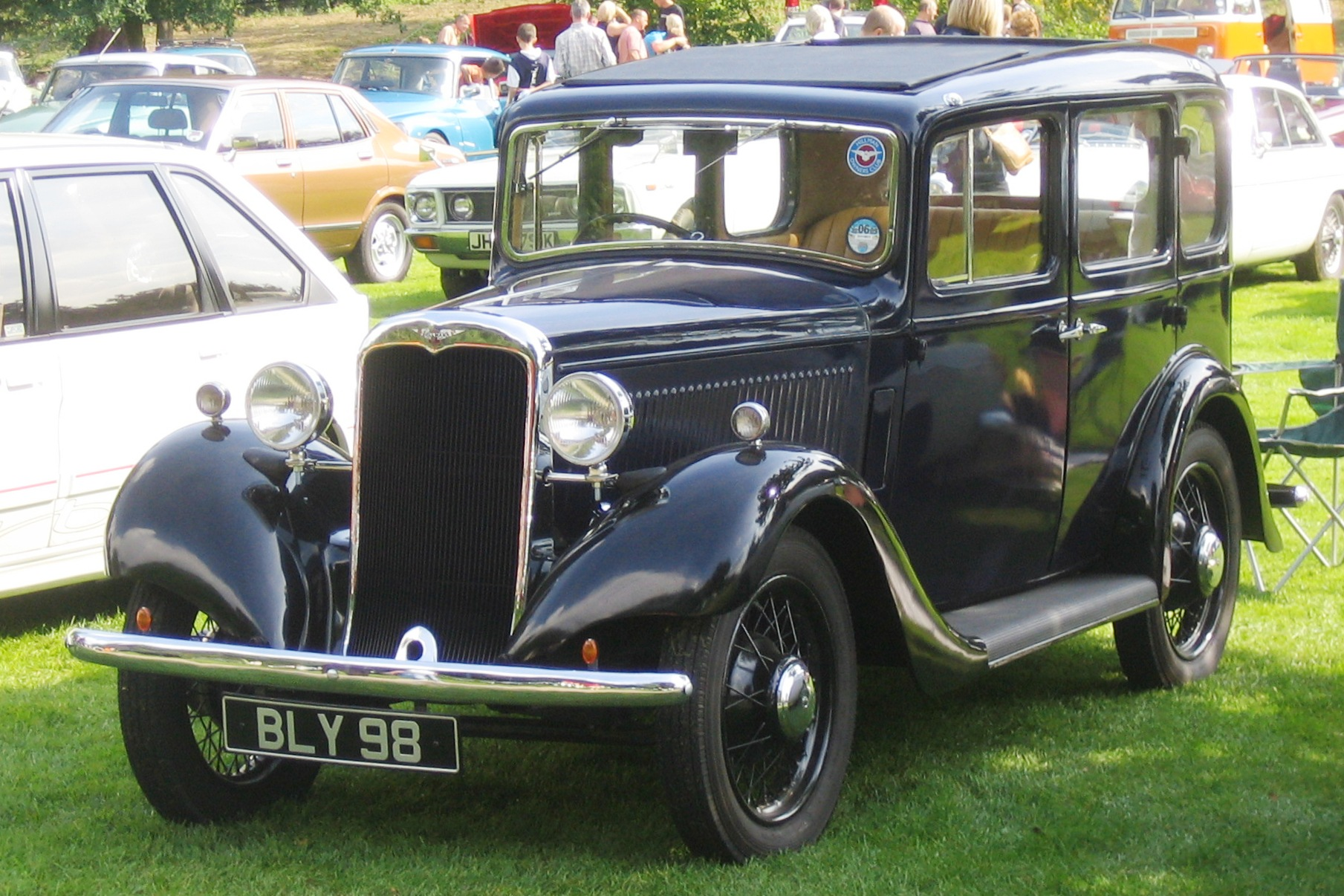
Hillman

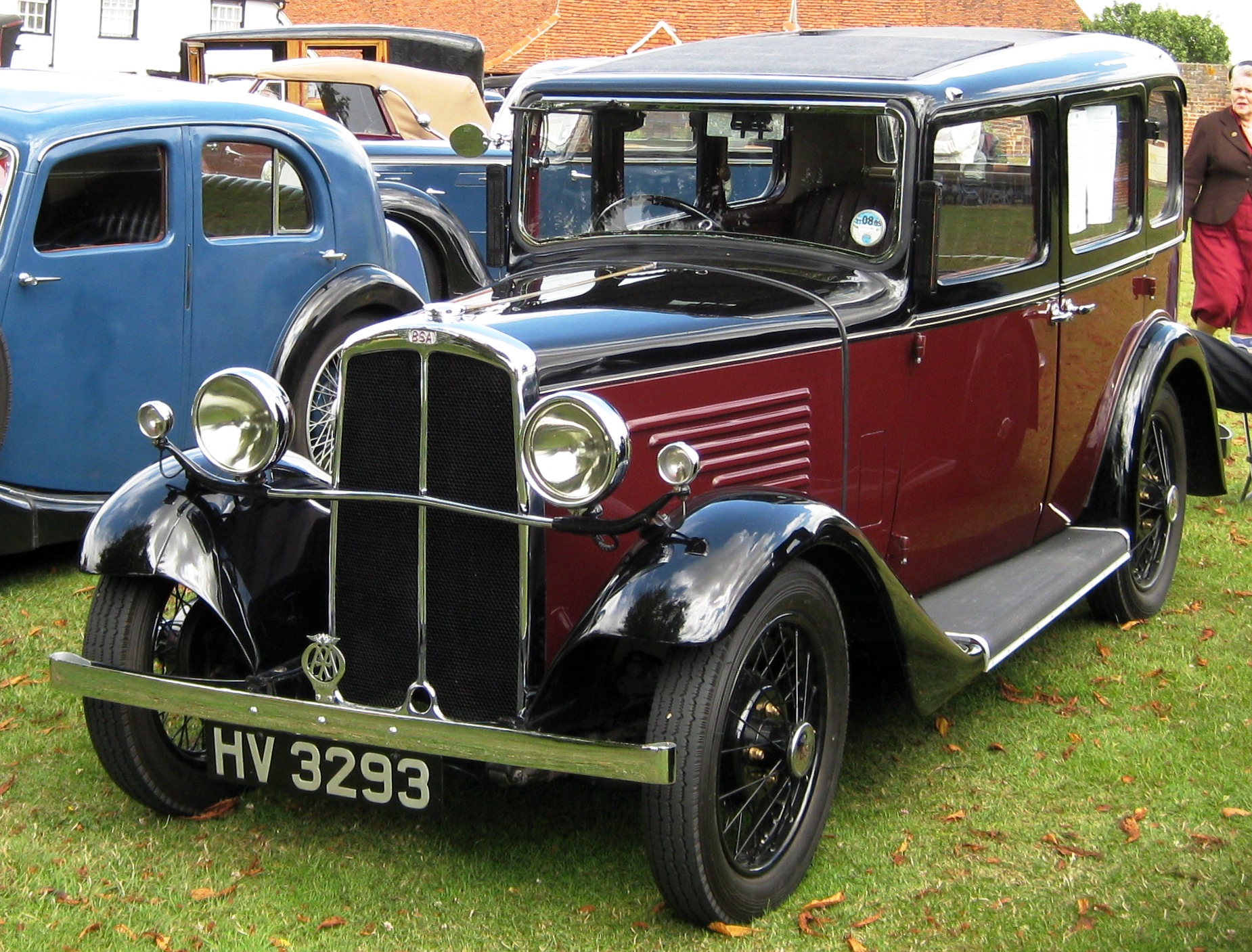
BSA / Lanchester (Note: John Bullock, a long-term Rootes employee, in his book The Rootes Brothers, Patrick Stephens, Sparkford Somerset ISBN 1852604549 says that Pressed Steel were so upset by the Rootes brothers' hard bargaining they sold the same body to Lanchester. The Rover version is said to come from Maurice Wilks' association with Pressed Steel in his (long before Minx) Hillman days)

==== Family 10 ====
Announced in August 1930 the steel safety saloon, with safety glass windscreen, continued alongside the Weymann saloon and Weymann Sportsman's Coupé all given a new name but still the same car on the same old Rover 8 chassis though with improved rear suspension. Its half-elliptic springs replaced the previous car's quarter-elliptics. The Family Ten would continue after July 1932 alongside the new redesigned-under-the-skin 10 Special. Sliding roof, cam steering and a new type radiator stone guard of improved appearance were improvements the Family 10 shared with the new Special. The 10 Special's 4-speed gearbox was available as an optional extra.

Road test

The correspondent of The Times reported the smooth and quiet steel saloon would reach 46 mph on the straight. Once under way the acceleration was satisfying. The large bonnet and small engine made for easy access to components. The controls were good, the steering light and steady, the brakes effective. There were one or two body squeaks.

In February 1932 "following a reorganisation of the company's management" (Note: At the end of 1931 managing director Frank Searle went to New Zealand to oversee the completion of a new Rover plant and Spencer Wilks took charge of Rover. The New Zealand plant at Petone opened 17 February 1932. It made Rover 10-25 cars from local materials and used imported steel panels and hide for the upholstery. Searle did not return to Rover.) Rover announced strengthening of the Family Ten chassis by using heavier gauge material and re-designed cross members to improve torsional rigidity. These improvements were, they said, the outcome of lengthy testing on New Zealand's and Australia's roughest roads carried out to make the cars suitable for overseas use. Petrol was now supplied from the tank by Autovac. A four-speed gearbox with quiet third was standard on the de luxe car and optional on the others. Brakes and springing had also been improved. There were detail improvements in the de luxe car now trimmed in hide.

Rover Ten Special
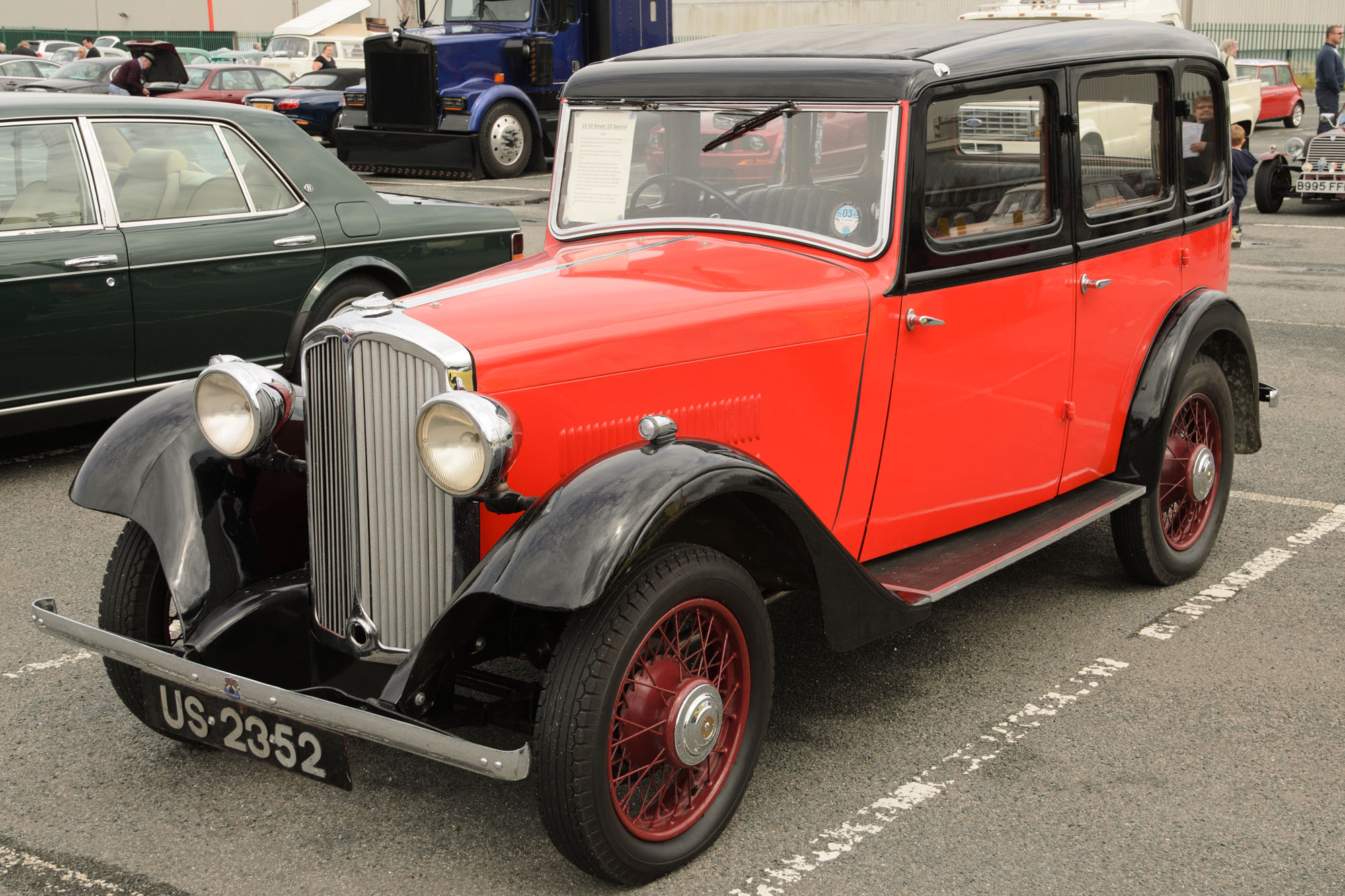
- 1933 6-light all-steel saloon

Overview
- Manufacturer: Rover
- Model years: 1932–1938
- Designer: Maurice Wilks

Body and chassis
- Body style: 4-door all steel saloon or coupé

Powertrain
- Engine: in-line 4 as in Family Ten but output 27 bhp @ 3,800 rpm
- Transmission: automatic clutch optional, freewheel, 4-speed gearbox-2nd and 3rd constant mesh double-helical, enclosed propeller shaft, spiral bevel final drive

Dimensions
- Wheelbase: 104 in (2,642 mm); Track 51 in (1,295 mm)
- Kerb weight: 2,380 lb (1,080 kg)

=== 10 Special—new chassis ===
An all new chassis with four speed gearbox, freewheel, automatic restart, bigger brakes, automatic clutch spiral bevel final drive and other facilities for the driver but bearing the same Pressed Steel body and, for the moment, the same engine was announced in July 1932. It was sold alongside the Family Ten for a 17 per cent premium.

The engine was now supported at just three not four points using special rubber insulation to control noise and vibration. Rover's—as it was promoted— Easy-free gear change was a new 4-speed gearbox with constant mesh double-helical gears for 2nd and 3rd and a freewheel device with its control beside the driver. A further convenience was an optional extra power-controlled or automatic clutch. A Startix automatic engine starter was fitted. Startix was activated when the ignition was switched on and, in addition, operated automatically if the engine stalled. The new change-speed system meant gears might be changed after a slight easing of the accelerator without using the clutch yet making no noise. A knob on the instrument panel switched of the freewheel and returned the gearbox to orthodox. The half-elliptic spring on both axles are controlled by hydraulic shock-absorbers. The freewheel was to remain a feature of Rovers for more than 20 years.

The freewheel transmission placed more reliance on the braking system. The new brakes were Lockheed hydraulic with large diameter drums, they were self-compensating and self-lubricating. Rover's "silent coachwork". Special plant was installed at Rover's works to spray the inside of all body panels with asbestos to ensure quietness fire-proofing etc and insulation from extremes of heat and cold.

The body was mounted on a sub-frame with ample insulating material between frame and body. Body joints received treatment to avoid squeaks and the doors were fitted with silencers

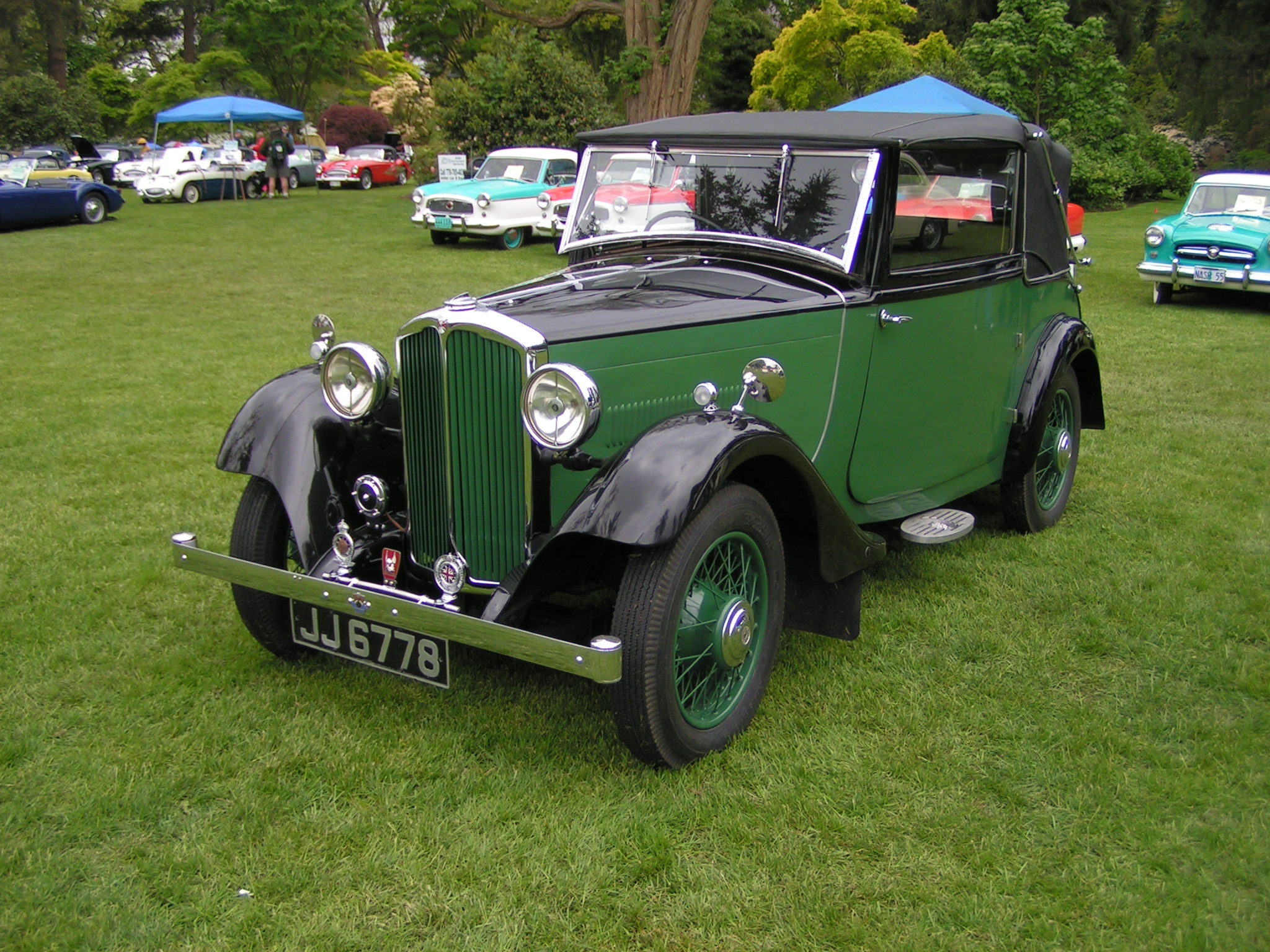
1933 coupé Tickford by Salmons

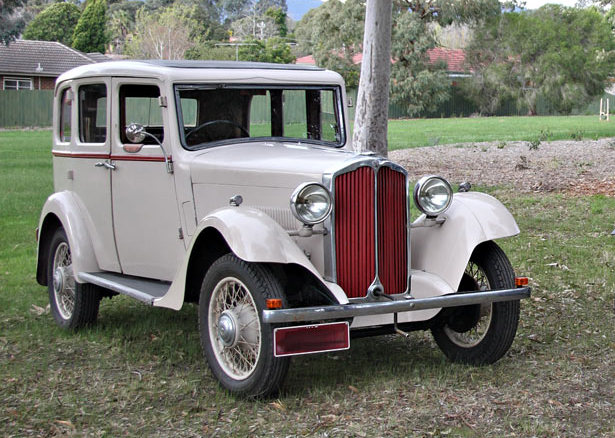
1933 6-light saloon body by Richards of Adelaide

"Specialised bodies by leading coach builders" available on all chassis, ordered from The Rover Company

- Carbodies Nizam semi-sports 2-seater
- Whittingham & Mitchel Rajah semi-sports 4-seater
- Grose Grose drophead coupé
- Geo Maddox & Sons Ranee foursome coupé drophead
- Charlesworth Bodies Pirate fixed head foursome coupé
- Weymann Motor Bodies Maharajah 4-door semi-sports saloon
- Salmons & Sons Tickford saloon
- Swallow Bodies Swallow four-door saloon
- Pressed Steel PSC Special

== Rover 10 P1 (1933–1938) ==
Rover 10
- 1936 4-door saloon

Overview
- Manufacturer: Rover
- Production: 1933–1938. 9202 made
- Designer: Maurice Wilks and Robert Boyle

Body and chassis
- Body style: saloon, coupé, open tourer
- Related: Rover 12

Powertrain
- Engine: 1.4 L straight 4
- Transmission: 4-speed manual

Dimensions
- Wheelbase: 105 in (2,667 mm)
- Length: 152 in (3,861 mm)
- Width: 61 in (1,549 mm)

The 1933 10 announced in the autumn of 1933 was really a new car with new underslung chassis and new 1389 cc engine. It was the first car to be developed by Rover after the Wilks brothers Spencer and younger brother Maurice joined the company. The car was relatively expensive at GBP238 - the Austin 10 was GBP168 - and reflected the new company policy of moving upmarket rather than chasing volume. The Pressed Steel body was continued but there were no more fabric bodied models. Chassis were also supplied to a wide range of external coachbuilders.

The engine was flexibly mounted in the chassis to reduce vibration and a freewheel device was fitted to help gear changing on the non-synchromesh gearbox and save fuel, a 15% improvement in economy was claimed. The freewheel would continue to be a feature of some Rovers until 1959.

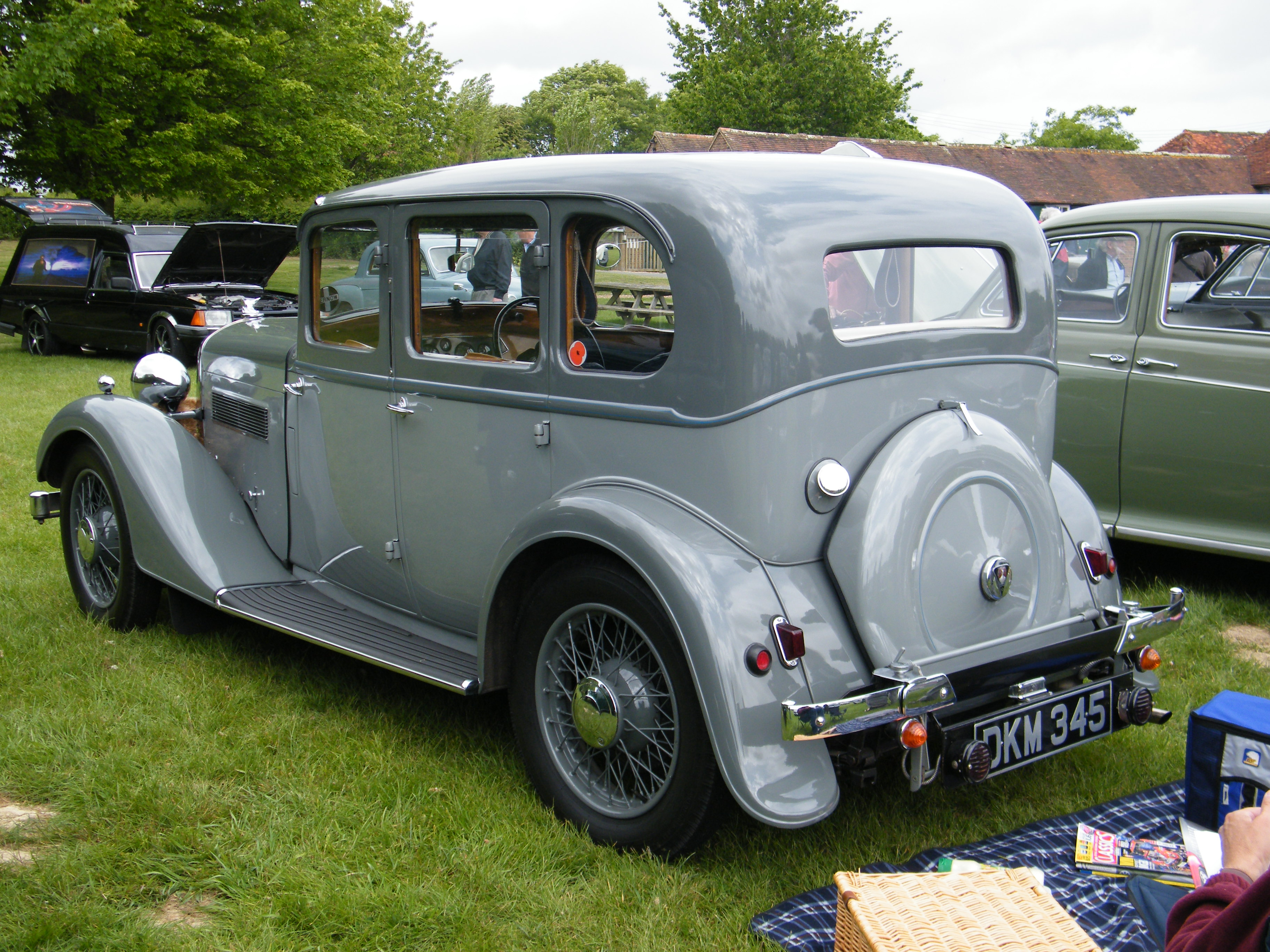
4-door saloon registered December 1936

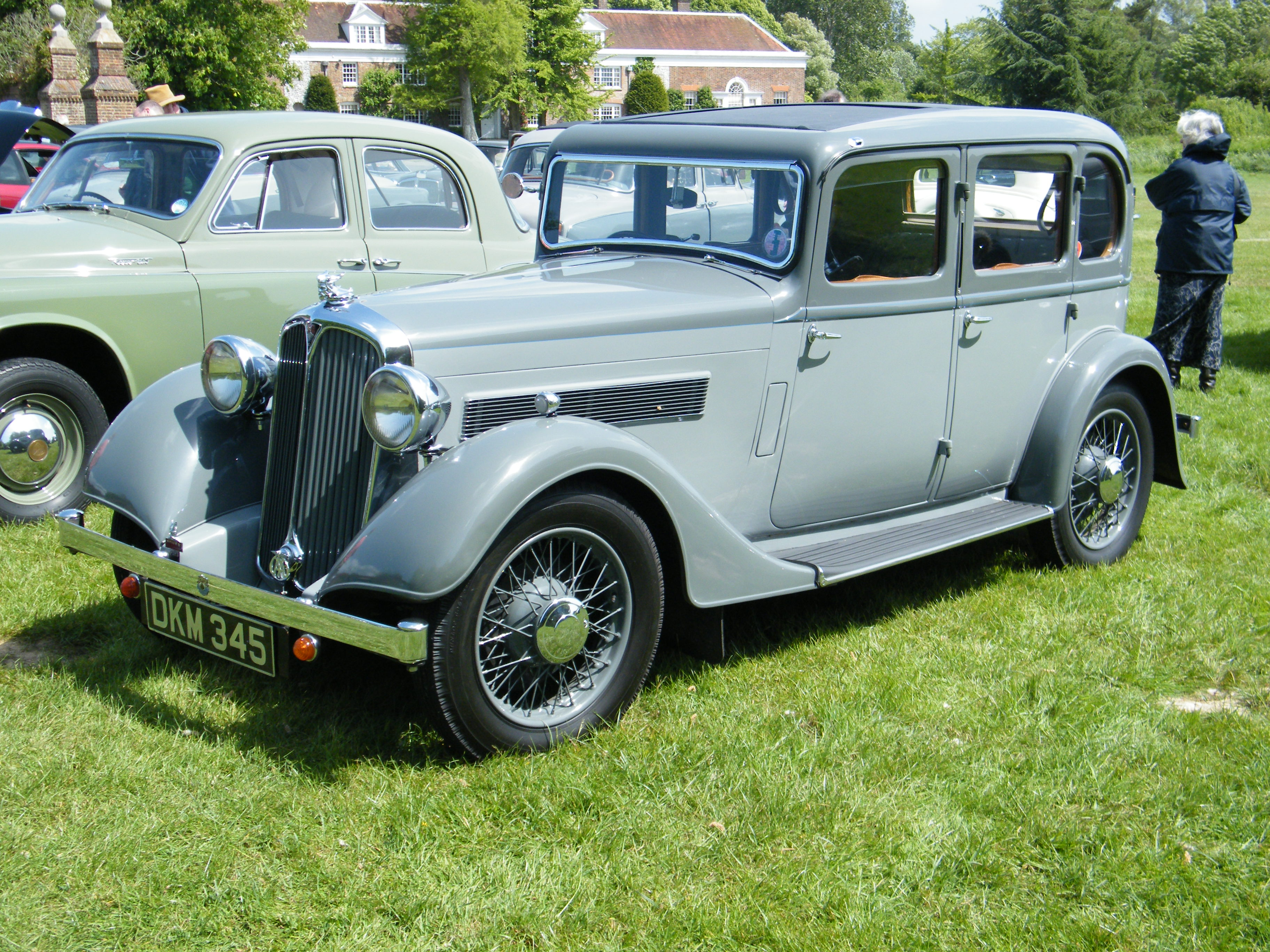

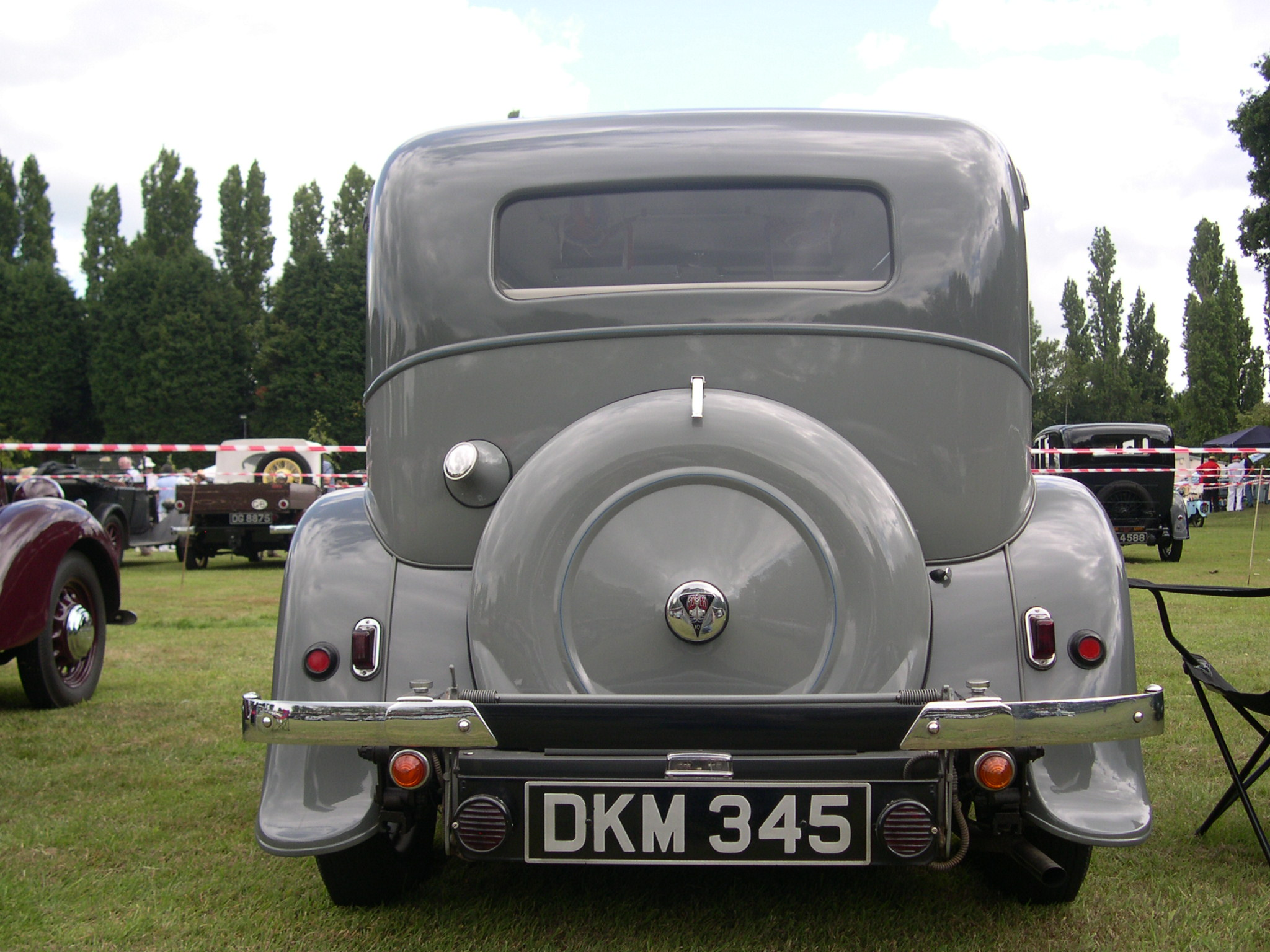

== Rover 10 P2 (1939–1947) ==
Rover 10
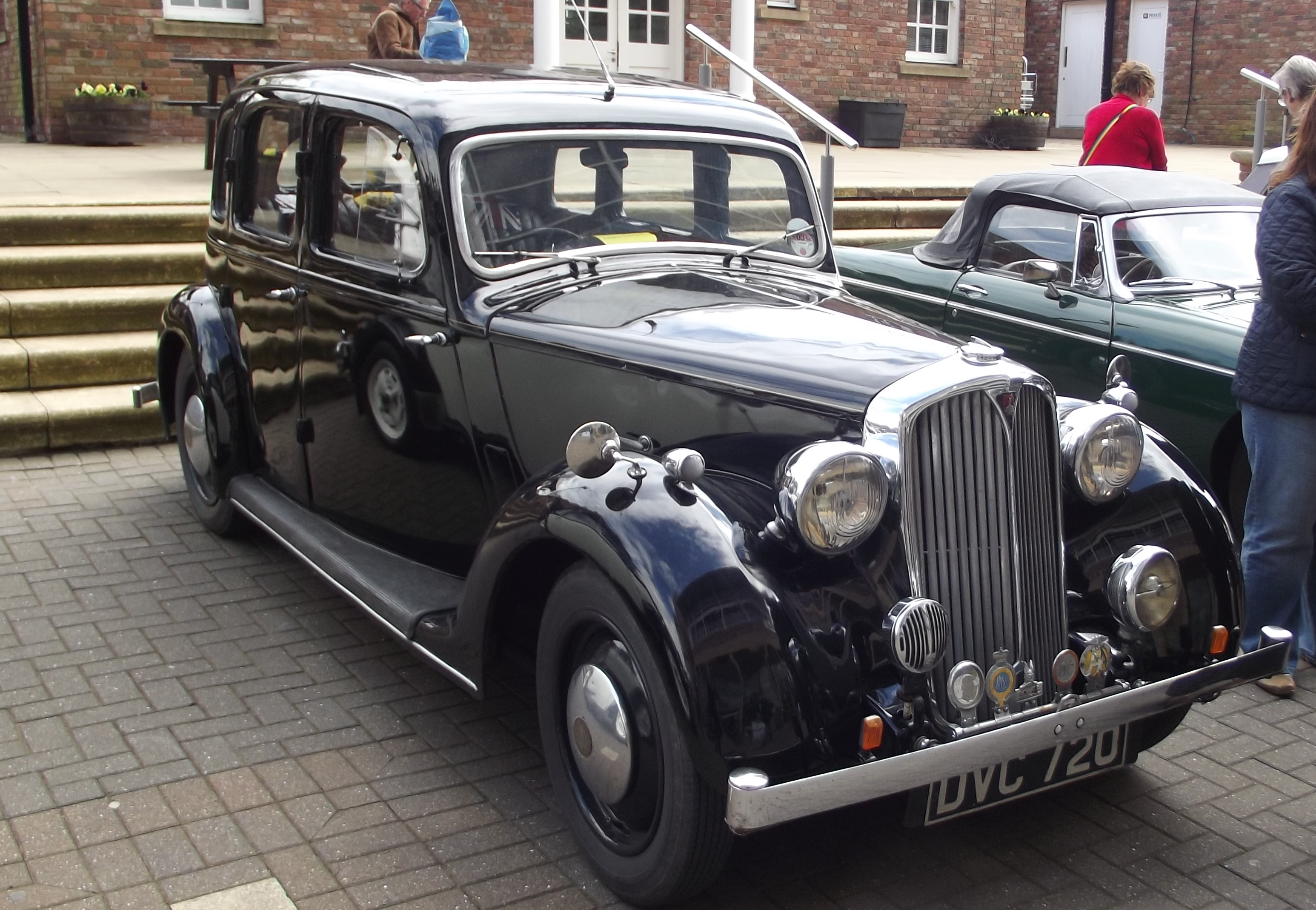
- 4-door saloon registered November 1938

Overview
- Manufacturer: Rover
- Production: 1939–1947; 2,640 made post war

Body and chassis
- Body style: 4-door 6-light saloon; 2-door coupé

Powertrain
- Engine: 1.4 L straight 4
- Transmission: 4-speed manual

Dimensions
- Wheelbase: 105 in (2,667 mm)
- Length: 163 in (4,140 mm)
- Width: 62 in (1,575 mm)

The final version of the 10 was launched in 1939. This was part of the Rover P2 range, along with Rover 12, Rover 14, Rover 16 and Rover 20 models. The chassis was slightly modified getting an extra half inch (12 mm) in the wheelbase and the engine got a new cylinder head increasing power from 44 to 48 bhp. Synchromesh was fitted to the top two ratios on the gearbox. The body was restyled in the Rover style of the time. The price was now GBP275 for the saloon but few were made before the outbreak of war and production stopping in 1940.

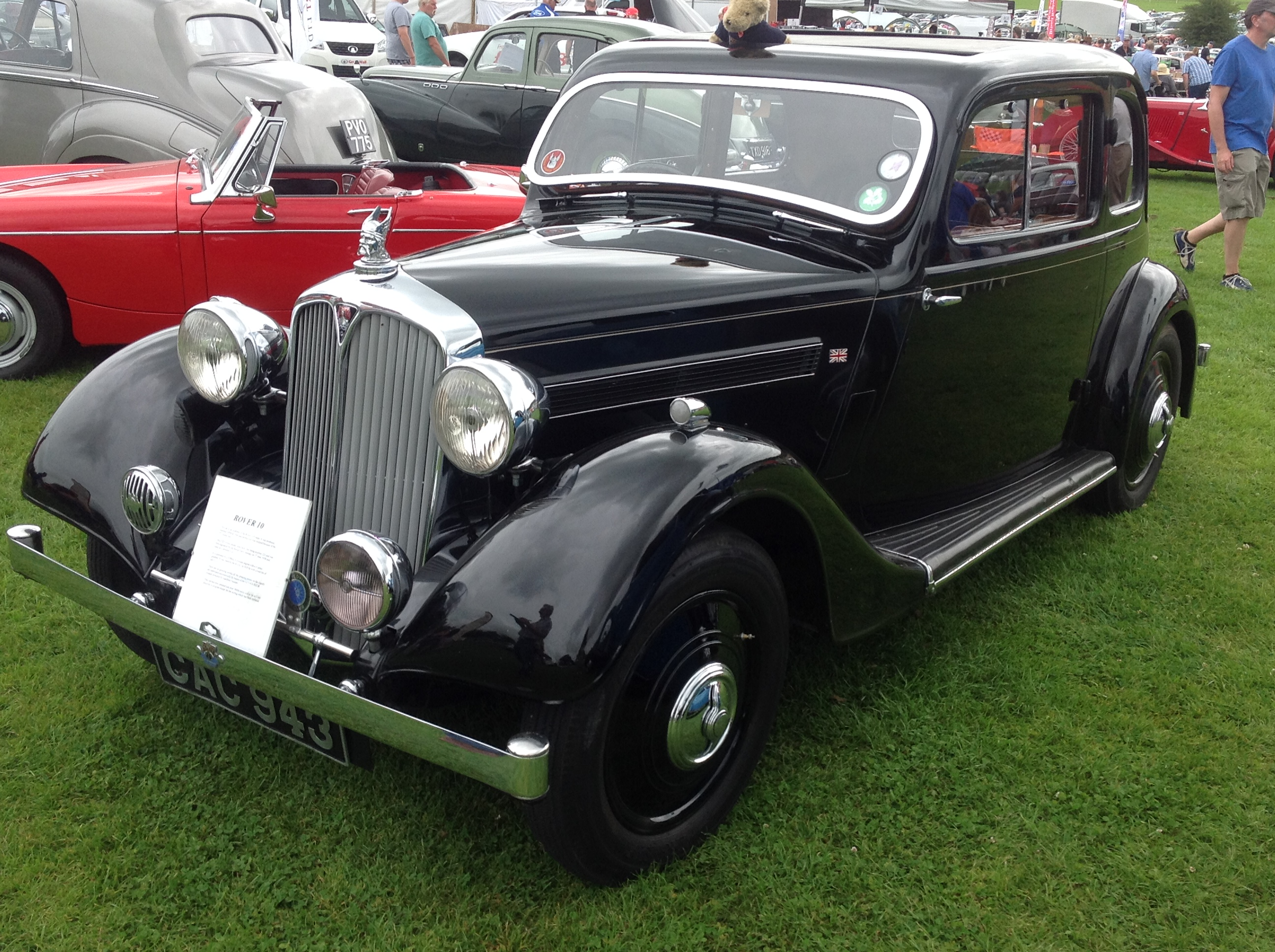
1939 coupé

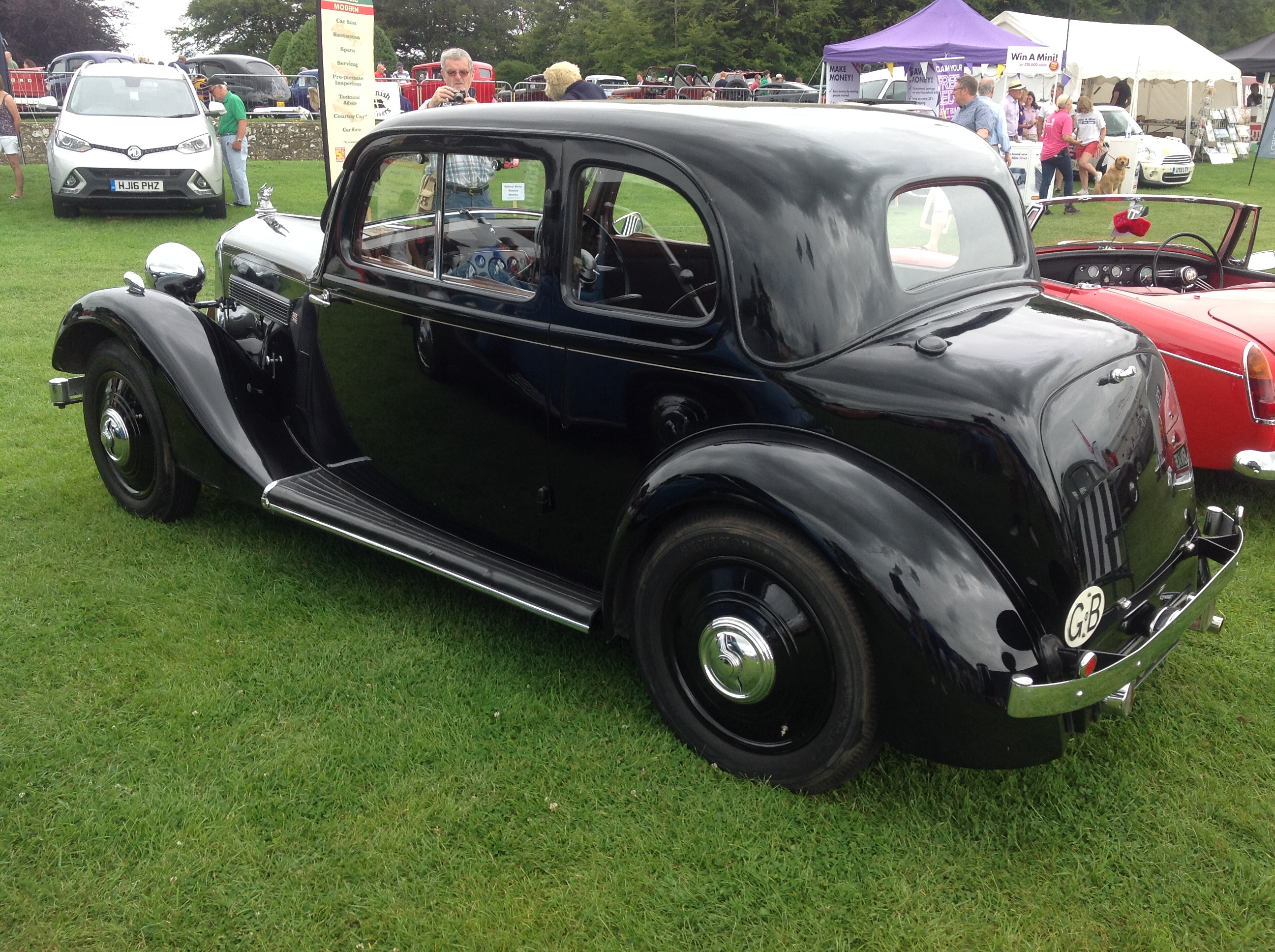
1939 coupé

The Coventry factory was damaged by bombing in November 1940 and when production restarted it was from the new Solihull works. The cars were little changed but a left hand drive version to help the export drive arrived in 1947 along with an optional heater.

The final cars were made in 1947.
