= Rover 9 =

Rover 9/20
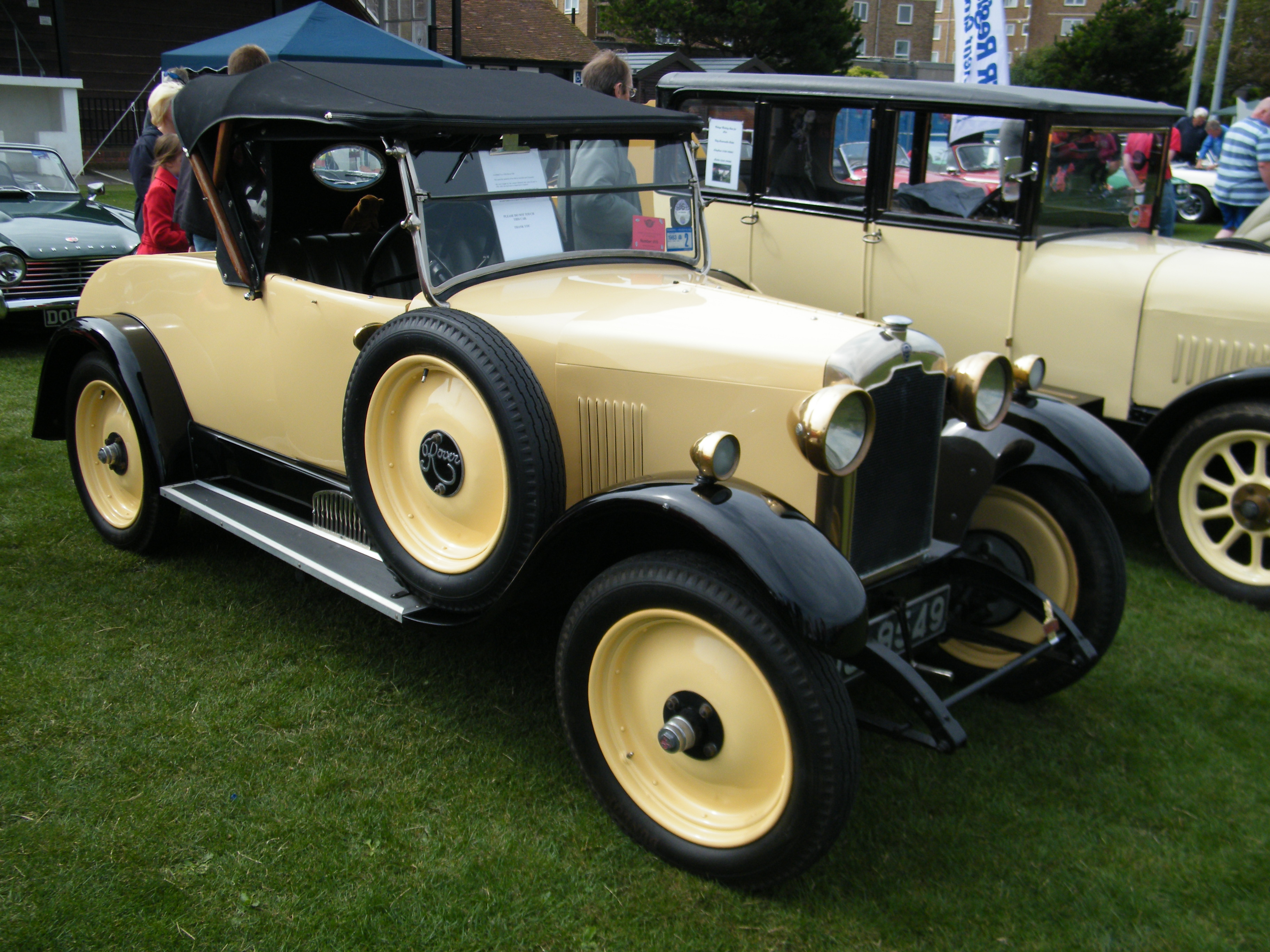
- 1926 two-seater

Overview
- Manufacturer: Rover
- Designer: Jack Sangster

Body and chassis
- Body style: open 2-seater or 4-seater; fixed head coupé; 4-door Weymann saloon

Dimensions
- Wheelbase: standard: 94 inches (2,388 mm); de luxe: 99 inches (2,515 mm); super: 104 inches (2,642 mm); Track 48 inches (1,219 mm)
- Length: 132 inches (3,353 mm)
- Width: 63 inches (1,600 mm)
- Kerb weight: 1,813 lb (822 kg)

Rover 9/20

Overview
- Manufacturer: Rover
- Designer: Mark Wild and staff
- Production: 1924 – 1933

Layout
- Configuration: straight four
- Displacement: 1,074 cc (66 cu in)
- Cylinder bore: 60 mm (2.4 in)
- Piston stroke: 95 mm (3.7 in)
- Cylinder head material: aluminium alloy crankcase
- Valvetrain: overhead valves by Duralumin pushrods, chain-driven camshaft

Combustion
- Oil system: forced lubrication by a gear pump in the sump
- Cooling system: water pumped through radiator, no fan

Output
- Power output: 20 bhp (15 kW; 20 PS) @ 3,000 rpm Tax horsepower 8.93

Dimensions
- Dry weight: 329 lb (149 kg)

Chronology
- Predecessor: Rover 8
- Successor: Rover 10/25

The Rover 9 is a small car produced by Britain's Rover car company. It had a 1074 cc 9 fiscal horsepower four-cylinder engine. Manufactured from 1924 until 1927 it was first supplemented then replaced by Rover's 10-12 model.

== Engine ==
A Mark Wild and staff designed 1074 cc water-cooled four-cylinder engine with overhead valves announced August 1924 supplemented then replaced the Rover 8 air-cooled twin and the new vehicle was named 9/20 The new engine with its clutch and gearbox are mounted as a unit to the mainframe at four points. z

Advertised by Rover as "The Nippy Nine" with emphasis on its water coolant circulated by pump, pressure lubricated engine, 3-speed gearbox and silent worm (rear) axle. "Super" models were supplied with rod-operated four-wheel brakes. Steering was by rack and pinion, worm and segment in the more expensive cars. At first the open 4-seater cars had just one door beside the front passenger's seat.

== Bodywork ==
- Standard open 2-seater, open 4-seater tourer
- De Luxe open 2-seater, open 4-seater tourer, fixed head coupé
- Super open 2-seater, 4-seater, fixed head coupé and 4-door 4-seater Weymann saloon
- Sports 4-seater

The wheelbase was 104 inches and track 48 inches. The 4-seater sports had a 99-inch wheelbase.

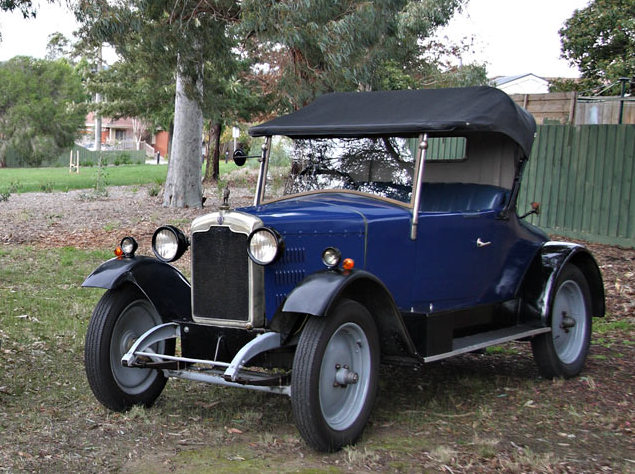
1925 open 2-seater

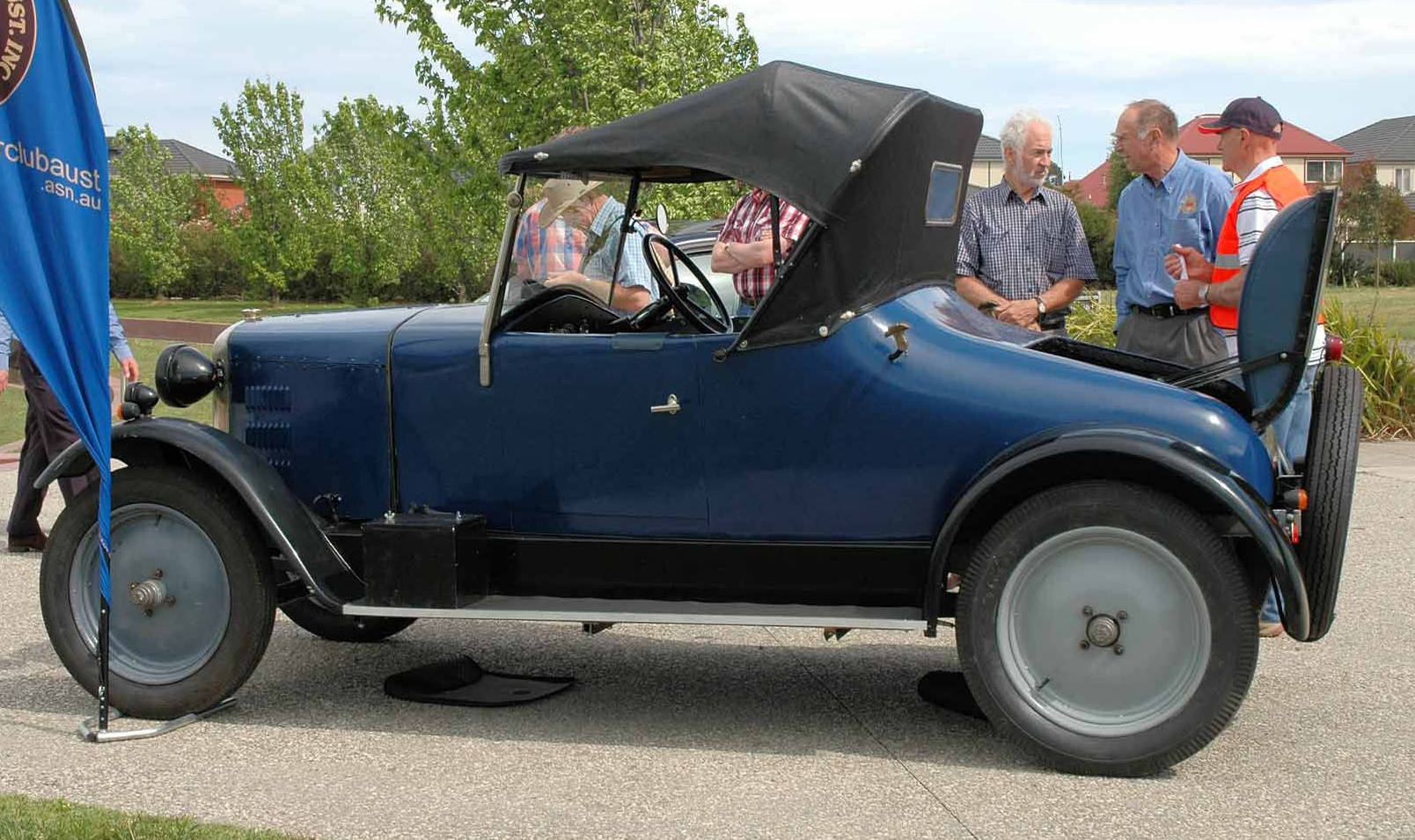
The Nippy Nine, dickie seat open

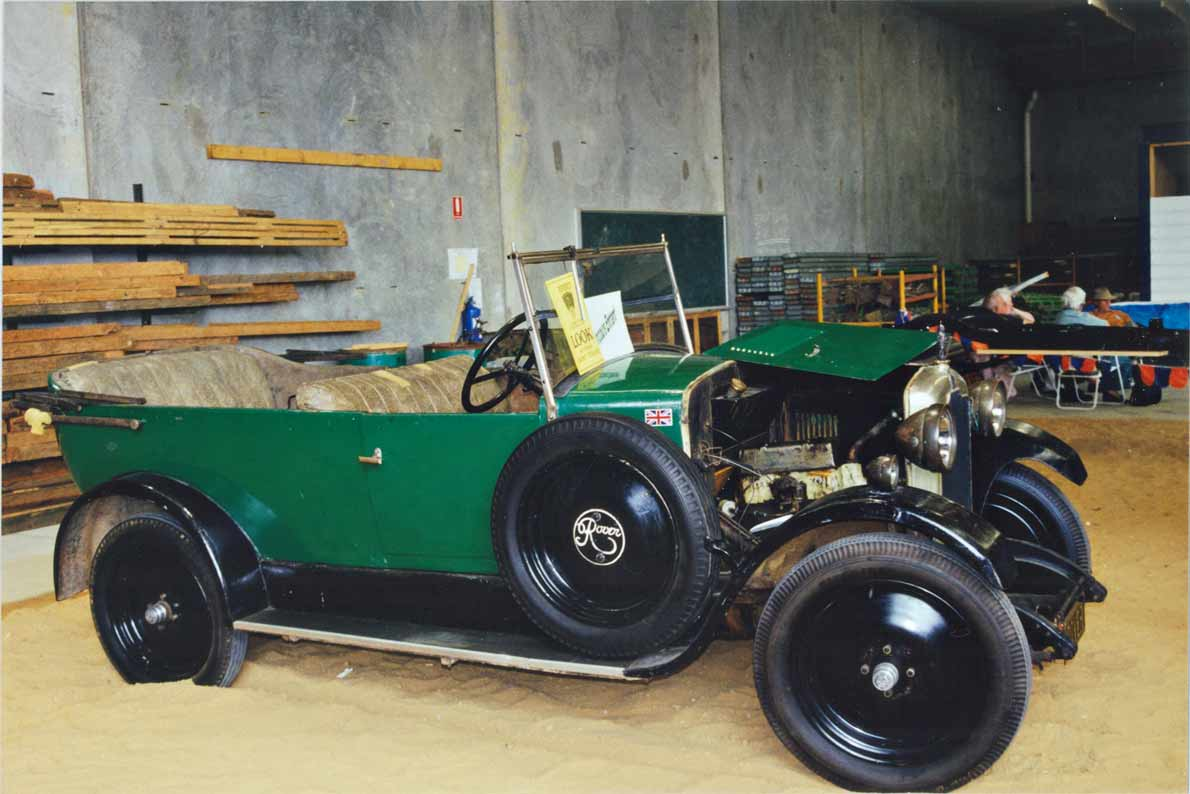
1925 4-seater tourer

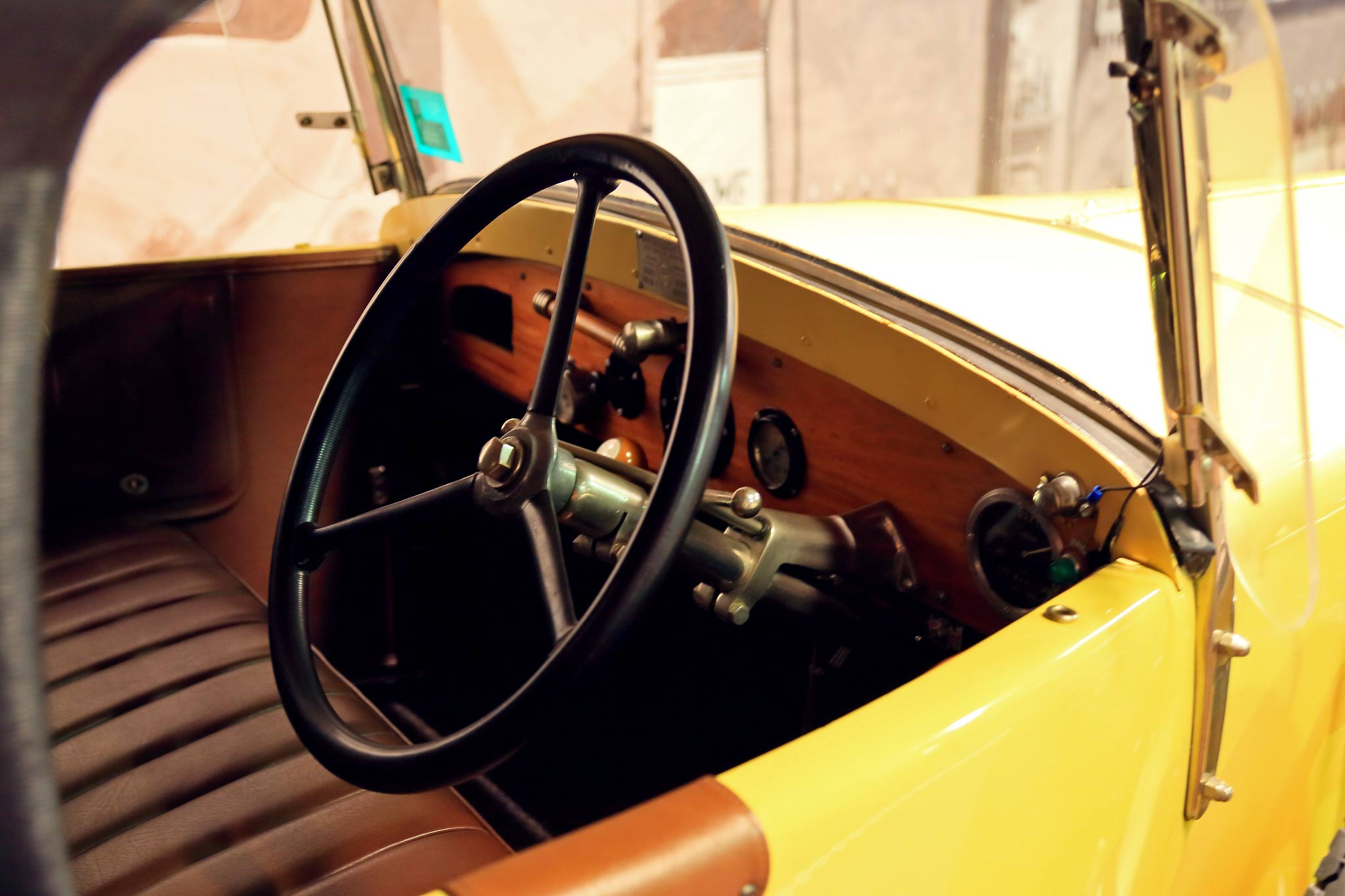
1925 instrument panel no driver's door

== Road test ==
The test car was the sports model with aluminium pistons, double valve springs, higher gear ratios and a lighter body. The car was considered to run pleasantly and do around 60 mph in top gear. When supplied for export the radiator is given a fan. There were complaints about accessibility for servicing and minor repairs. The engine was thought to be unusually smooth for a two-bearing product even at high speed. The steering wheel shook on rough roads otherwise controls were smooth and even. A final comment was "at the price one cannot fairly grumble at three speeds".

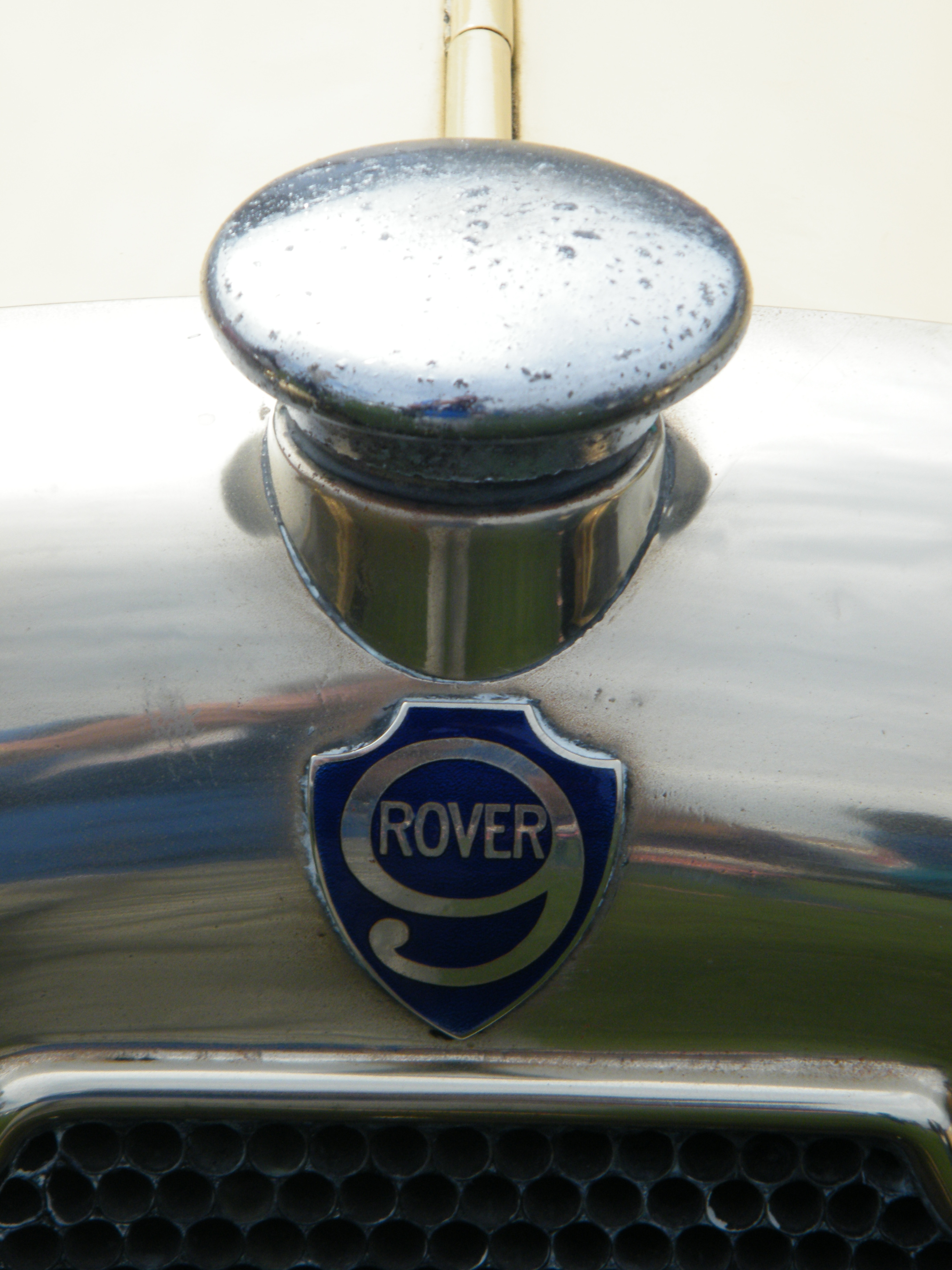
Badge
