= Grose =

English automobile

The Grose was an English automobile built between 1898 and 1901, Grose also built bodies for cars, buses, ambulances and commercial vehicles until the late 1950s.

== Company History ==
Mr. Joseph G. Grose began work as a leather currier in Ambush Street, St. James' End, Northampton. He took an interest in cycle racing and held several national records before becoming a cycle repairer and maker. In 1897 he invented the Grose patent gear case made of leather that covered the cycle's driving mechanism to protect ladies' skirts from catching in the chain. This sold in large numbers and was so successful that the Grose Gear Case Company Ltd. was formed in July 1897 to manufacture it. The case was later used to cover the drive chain of early motor cars.

He was sufficiently successful to be able in 1897 to run the first motor car in the town, a Coventry Motette. Following this he bought six Benz engines and fitted them to his own chassis and sold them as the Grose-Benz. An advert in 1902 describes a car built by Grose Ltd as a 4-seater dog-cart fitted with 3HP genuine Benz engine and walnut body. Connolly solid tyres back wheel, pneumatic front. Price patent brakes, Coventry chains, basket luggage carrier. "This car is fitted with three speeds and will climb any hill in England".

In February 1900 the company's name was changed to Grose Ltd and the gearcase business was sold and the factory in Pike Lane, Northampton was adapted to manufacture "Grose" Steel Studded Non-Skid Tyres, which Joseph Grose had invented for his newly built motor cars.

The business continued to expand moving into motorcycle sales and repairs, coachbuilding, commercial vehicle building and operating. A fleet of taxi-cabs was purchased in 1908 and operated from Pike Lane, the first motor taxi-cabs in Northampton. In 1912 Grose Ltd. registered a subsidiary company, Northampton Motor Omnibus Co. Ltd. operating local routes until 1928. Many of their buses had Grose-built bodies.

In 1924 Grose took over the works of the Croft Motor Carriage Works Ltd on Kingsthorpe Road which had gone into voluntary liquidation, and this became the centre for his coachbuilding business.

As well as producing some individual car bodies the company specialised in short production runs of standard designs. The first designs were for a two-seat and dickey sports body and were first fitted to the Alvis 12/40 and 12/50 models.

In the 1930s Grose was listed as an approved coachbuilder by several major manufacturers including Rover with the Kingsley drophead coupe and Vauxhall, and the Sywell body fitted to the Alvis Firefly. In 1935 the Riley Motor Company was added with two drophead designs called the Burcote and the Horton. The names were taken from Northamptonshire villages.

In the late 1920s Joseph Grose's children entered the business with Will Grose as managing director, Frank Grose as Sales Director and Kate as Company Secretary. Joseph died in 1939 and his children continued to run the company.

The company took a stand at the London Motor show for many years with their final appearance in 1936.

Car body making continued until 1939 and commercial bodies until 1959, though the Kingsthorpe coachworks wasn't sold until 1969.

Grose was purchased by Bristol Street Motors in 2012 (approx)

== Cars with Grose bodies ==
Invicta S-Type by Grose

The following lists examples for which there is a photographic record in the Northampton archives.

- 1918 Buick-Six 4 door saloon
- 1918 Buick-Six Limousine coupe
- 1919 Calcott drophead coupe
- 1919 Rover 8hp hard top
- 1920 Darracq
- 1920 Morris 4 seater saloon
- 1920 Alvis 2 seater sports
- 1921 Citroen
- 1923 Ford Model T 2 seater sports
- 1924 Renault saloon
- 1924 Darracq 2 seater sports (shown at Olympia)
- 1924 Alvis 2 seater(shown at Olympia)
- 1924 Alvis Limousine coupe
- 1925 Lanchester Pullman saloon
- 1925 Leyland 8 saloon
- 1925 Talbot 4 seater sports
- 1925 Crossley 4 seater saloon sports
- 1925 Vauxhall 2 seater sports
- 1925 Talbot saloon
- 1925 Darracq drophead coupe (shown at Olympia)
- 1926 Crossley saloon
- 1926 Crossley drophead coupe
- 1926 Talbot 4 seater
- 1926 Rover 4 seater drophead coupe
- 1926 Dodge Bros. Laundelette
- 1926 Rover 4/5 seater
- 1928 Darracq Six Special 4 seater sports
- 1928 Darracq Six Special saloon
- 1928 Hillman 2 door coupe
- 1928 Darracq Six Special sports
- 1929 Buick 4 seater coupe (shown at Olympia)
- 1929 Vauxhell 4 seater saloon (shown at Olympia)
- 1929 Marquette 4 seater coupe
- 1929 Buick 'Laundelet'
- 1930 Buick folding roof saloon
- 1930 Mercedes 4 seater coupe
- 1930 La Salle saloon
- 1930 Buick 4 seater drophead coupe
- 1930 Talbot Darracq 4 seater saloon
- 1930 Vauxhall Light-six 4 seater
- 1930 Rover drophead coupe
- 1930 Rover "Kingsley" drophead coupe
- 1931 Vauxhall Cadet 4 seater coupe
- 1931 Lanchester 4 seater sports saloon
- 1931 Daimler 4 seater sports saloon
- 1931 Alvis speed 20 sports
- 1931 Rolls-Royce saloon
- 1932 Rover "Meteor" 4 seater coupe
- 1932 Talbot saloon sports
- 1932 Talbot 4 seater
- 1932 Rover "Gazelle" sports coupe
- 1932 Alvis 4 seater sports coupe
- 1932 Talbot sports coupe (shown at Olympia)
- 1932 Rover drophead coupe
- 1933 Rover "Gazelle" sports coupe
- 1933 Talbot 2 seater
- 1933 Rover drophead coupe
- 1933 Tabot 4 seater saloon
- 1934 Vauxhall Big 6 "Alderton" fixed head coupe
- 1934 Vauxhall Big 6 "Coton" saloon (shown at Olympia)
- 1934 Vauxhall Big 6 "Lamport" coupe (shown at Olympia)
- 1936 Rover drophead coupe
- 1936 Lanchester Light Six sports saloon
- 1936 Alvis "Firebird" 2 door coupe
- 1936 Lagonda 4 seater sports coupe
- 1936 Invicta drophead coupe
- 1936 Riley "Kestrel" drophead coupe (shown at Olympia)
- 1936 Alvis "Firefly" 4 door saloon
- 1936 Hillman Limousine
- 1936 Riley "Kestrel" 2 door coupe

== Buses, coaches and commercial vehicles with Grose bodies ==
The manufacture of bus and coach bodies started with the acquisition of the Kingsthorpe works in 1924, and continued until WW2. While many of the bodies were made for the Grose-owned Northampton Motor Omnibus Company in the period up to 1928 (and after it had been sold), many smaller coaches of 20 to 30 seats were made for different operators. However production also included Guy 54 seater double-decker bus bodies exhibited at the Commercial Motor Show in 1929, and supplied to Northampton Corporation Transport in 1930/1931.

The last time a Grose bodied coach was exhibited at the Commercial Vehicle Show was in 1937, when Thornycroft showed their new Beautyride, based on a modified Thornycroft Sturdy chassis with a 26-seater luxury body by Grose offering "a high degree of comfort to the passengers".

Commercial vehicle body production started in 1924 alongside the buses and coaches, but continued at a lower level after WW2. Production appears to have been bespoke designs for individual customers. Grose also built some ambulance bodies based on a Commer chassis (1935), Bedford chassis (1937), Rolls-Royce (1938), Vauxhall (1939) and during the war were involved in converting vehicles for ambulance duties and for mobile first aid.

Post-war bodies included a Bedford-based travelling library and a mobile shop, hard top body and truck body for the Land Rover (1950/1951), and a Bedford-based show van for Exide batteries in 1958.

== See also ==
- List of car manufacturers of the United Kingdom
