= Whittingham & Mitchel =

Former British company

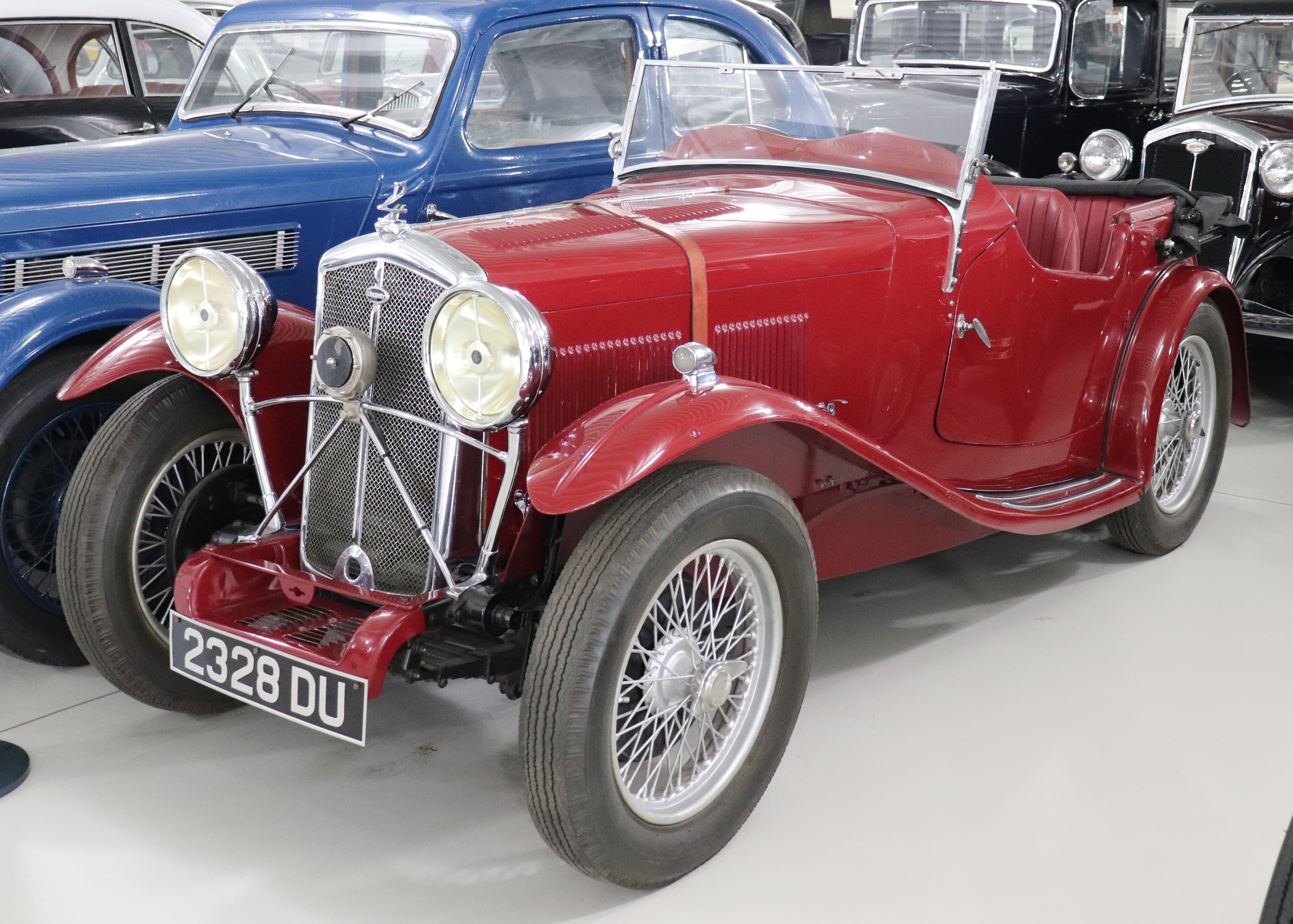
1932 Wolseley Hornet, British Motor Museum, Gaydon

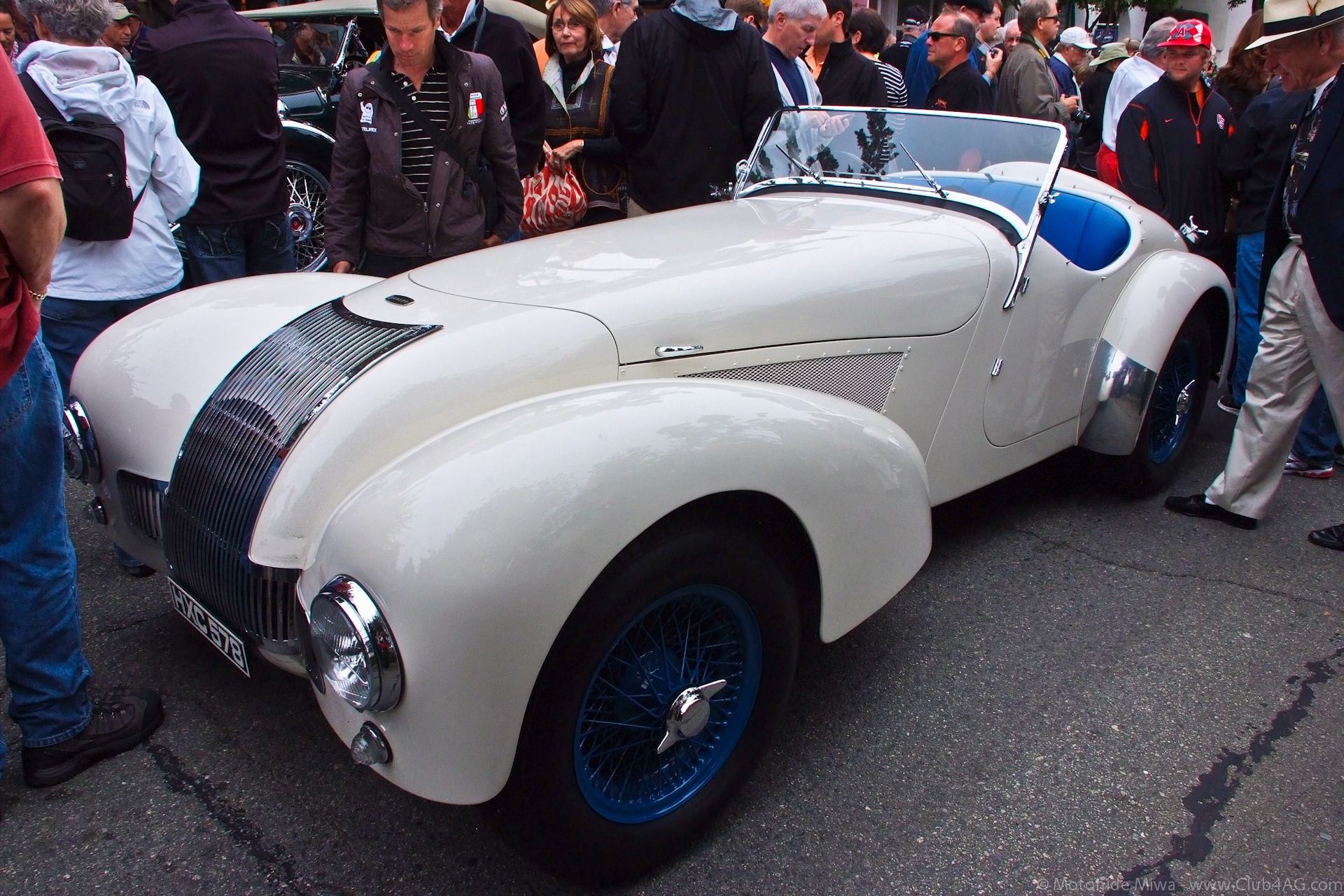
1946 Allard J1

Whittingham & Mitchel of Fulham United Kingdom were motor coach and body builders. A company named Whittingham and Mitchel Limited was formed in 1929 to buy that business.

During the second World War it made light alloy components for the armed forces. Following the war Whittingham and Mitchell moved to Byfleet, Surrey and into alloy marine equipment. 10 years later they moved into structural reinforced plastics and built new premises in Chertsey.

Whittingham and Mitchel Limited became a public listed company in July 1964. Six months later it was taken over and became part of the GEC group

== Motor coach and body builders ==
Whittingham and Mitchel made bodies for motor coaches. During the 1930s Whittingham & Mitchel also manufactured short runs of special open bodies for mass-produced cars such as Vauxhall and specialist cars such as Alvis, MG and Wolseley.

== Marine and structural engineers ==
Using special methods Whittingham and Mitchel rapidly made small ships up to 75 feet long such as fast coastal patrol boats. In 1964 a new coastal patrol boat was launched every 12 days and it took 36 days to manufacture a boat

== Plastics ==
Thermoplastic mouldings were manufactured for use as specialised containers for: radio, radar equipment, frozen food transportation and prefabricated kitchens and bathrooms.

== Takeover ==
Very shortly after the business was listed on the Stock Exchange in 1964 it was bought by a subsidiary of Arnold Weinstock's rapidly expanding GEC.

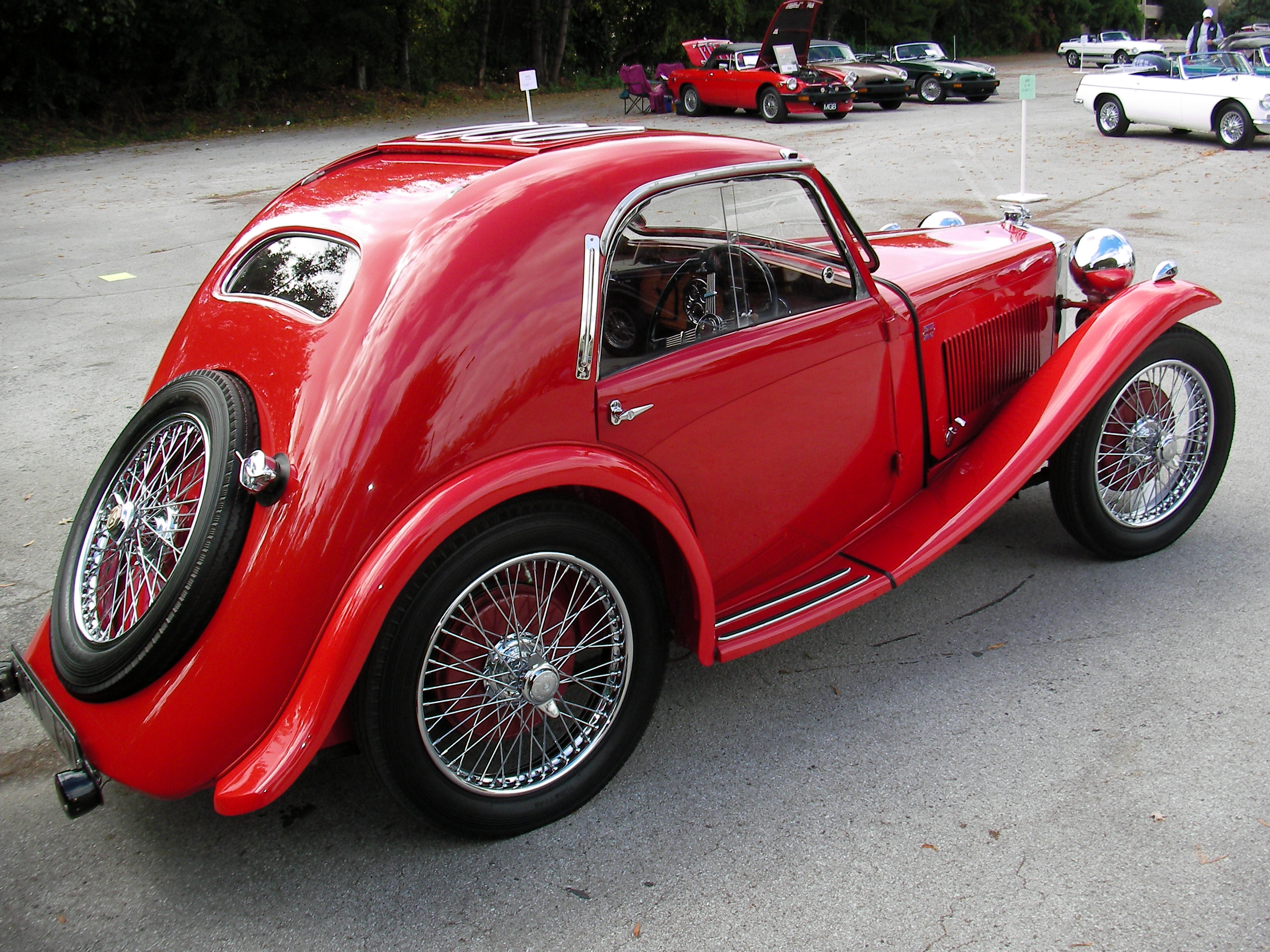
MG PA Airline Coupé
