= Lagonda 16/80 =

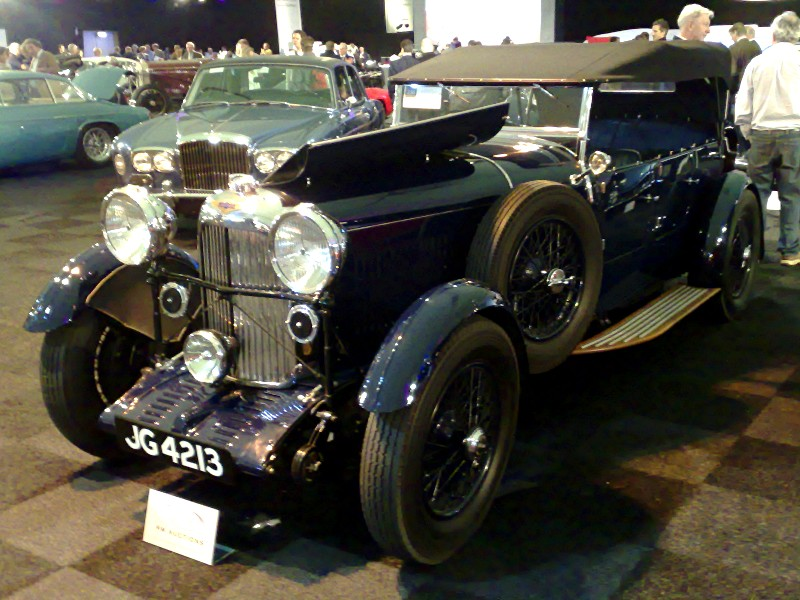

Overview
- Manufacturer: Lagonda
- Production: 1932–1934

Body and chassis
- Body style: 2 door sports, 4-door tourer, 4 door saloon

Powertrain
- Engine: 1991 cc ohv 6 cylinder

Dimensions
- Wheelbase: 120 in (3,048 mm)
- Length: 170 in (4,318 mm)
- Width: 66 in (1,676 mm)

Chronology
- Predecessor: Lagonda 2-litre

The Lagonda 16/80 is a sports touring car introduced by Lagonda in 1932, replacing the company's 4-cylinder 2-litre model.

The first part of its name referred to its Fiscal horsepower rating of 16 (actually 15.7). Under naming conventions common at the time, the second number in its name might have referred to the car's bhp. However, actual power output fell a long way short of 80 bhp, leading one well informed owner to suggest that it may have referred to the car's claimed top speed of 80 mph (129 km/h).

The car was unusual in being the only Lagonda to be offered with a Crossley engine. However, each engine purchased was stripped down by Lagonda, checked and rebuilt according to their own specifications before becoming the heart of a 16/80. It was fitted with twin HV3 type SU carburettors.

In 1933 the option of a E.N.V preselector gear-box became available. When new the car was guaranteed for nine years. However, a condition of the guarantee was that it be returned to the manufacturers every three years for a thorough overhaul and update, which would have been provided only at considerable cost.

The car was dropped by Lagonda, shortly before the firm's dramatic rescue from financial collapse by Alan Good, at the end of in 1934.

According to the Lagonda Club, 261 were made.

== Film & TV appearances ==
- A Lagonda 16/80 featured extensively in the BBC series Campion starring Peter Davison.
- Another is visible in a clip of the French singer Cilou (2020)
