= V12 =

V12 or V-12 may refer to:

== Aircraft ==
- Mil V-12, a Soviet heavy lift helicopter
- Pilatus OV-12, a planned American military utility aircraft
- Rockwell XFV-12, an American experimental aircraft project
- Škoda-Kauba V12, a Czechoslovak experimental aircraft project
- Vultee V-12, an American-designed bomber

== Automobiles ==
- Cadillac V-12, an American car
- Lagonda V12, a British car

== Music ==
- "V12", a song by Rich the Kid from the 2020 album Boss Man
- "V12", a song by Lisa from the 2026 EP Press Play

== Other uses ==
- V12 engine, an engine with twelve cylinders
- Simpiwe Vetyeka (born 1980), South African boxer
- V-12 Navy College Training Program, of the United States Navy during World War II
- Victor V12, a calculator
- V12, a grade in bouldering
- V12, a personal history of certain other diseases, in the ICD-9 V codes
