= Lagonda 16/65 =

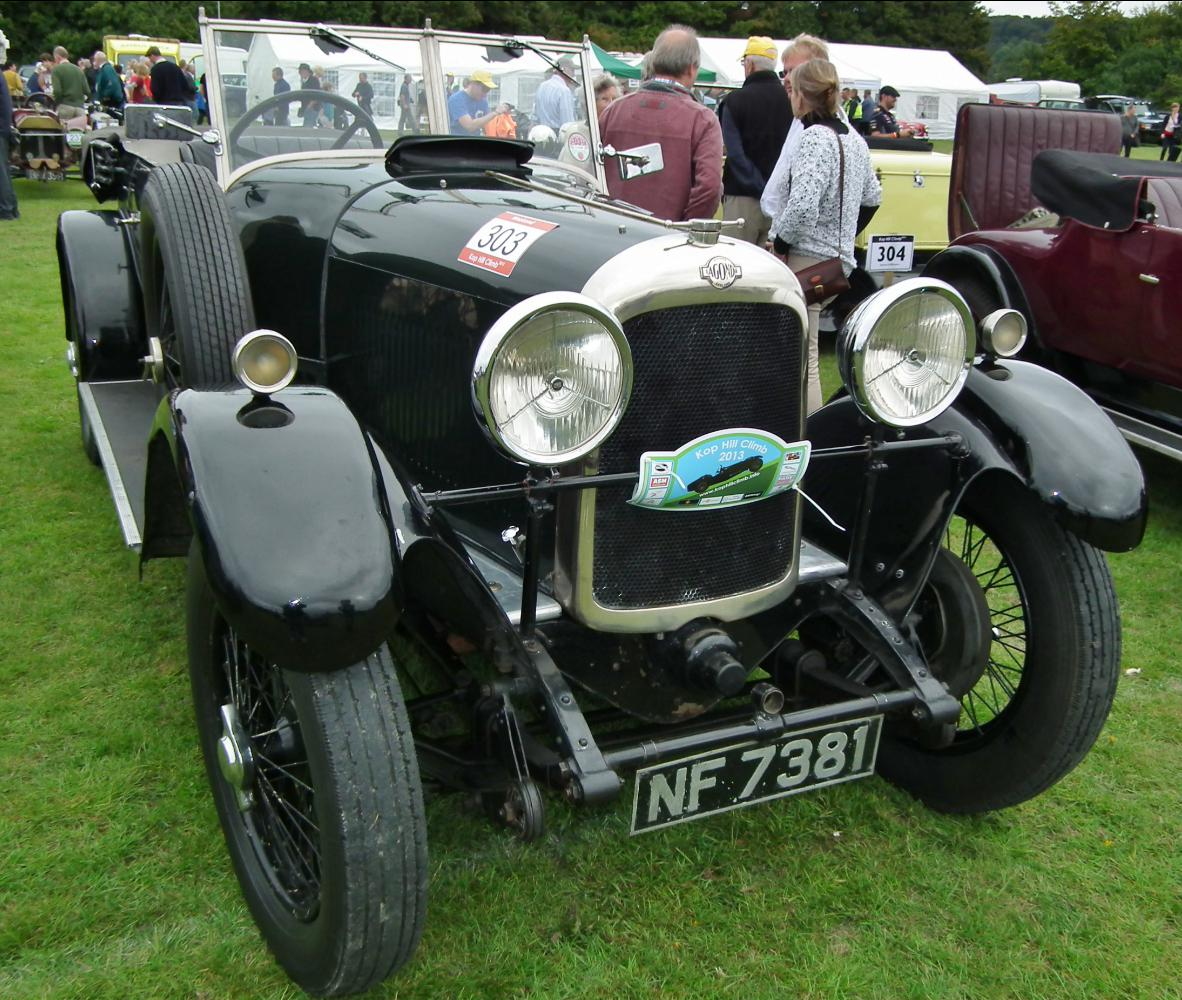

Overview
- Manufacturer: Lagonda
- Production: 1926–1930

Powertrain
- Engine: 2389 cc then 2692 cc ohv 6 cylinder
- Transmission: 4 speed manual

Dimensions
- Wheelbase: 129 in (3,277 mm)
- Length: 181 in (4,597 mm)
- Width: 68 in (1,727 mm)

Chronology
- Successor: Lagonda 3 Litre

The Lagonda 16/65 was a car introduced by Lagonda in 1926. Production continued until 1930.

Around 250 cars were made. Only one surviving car is known to the Lagonda club.

== Engine and transmission ==
The engine was a new design for the car by Arthur Davidson who had been with Lea-Francis. The 6-cylinder, overhead-valve engine had a capacity of 2389 cc at first but this was soon increased to 2692 cc. Both sizes had a stroke of 120mm and the smaller version a bore of 65mm increasing to 69mm for the larger one. A single Zenith carburettor was fitted.

The four-speed gearbox was driven through a single dry-plate clutch and short shaft to where it was located centrally in the car. From the gearbox an open shaft then went to the spiral-bevel rear axle.

== Chassis and suspension ==
The chassis was a lengthened version of that used in the 14/60. Semi-elliptical leaf springs were fitted front and rear. Wire-spoked wheels were used.

== Coachwork ==
Four-door saloon and tourer bodies were made by Lagonda with many of the saloons having fabric bodies. Some chassis went to external coachbuilders.

== Versatility ==
There is a record of one Lagonda 16/65 being used as a substitute for a tractor to sweep hay.
