= Buckingham (automobile) =

Buckingham 8

Overview
- Manufacturer: Buckingham Engineering Company
- Production: 1913-1914
- Designer: J F Buckingham

Body and chassis
- Class: Cyclecar
- Body style: 2-seat open

Powertrain
- Engine: 729 cc Buckingham single-cylinder

Dimensions
- Wheelbase: 82 inches (2083 mm)
- Length: 111 inches (2820 mm)
- Width: 52 inches (1320 mm)

Buckingham 10

Overview
- Manufacturer: Buckingham Engineering Company
- Production: 1920-1923
- Designer: J F Buckingham

Body and chassis
- Class: Light car
- Body style: 2-seat

Powertrain
- Engine: 1096 cc Buckingham V twin

Dimensions
- Wheelbase: 96 inches (2438 mm)
- Length: 124 inches (3150 mm)

The Buckingham was an English automobile manufactured by the Buckingham Engineering Company in Coventry from 1914 until 1923. The company had made cars under the Chota name from 1912.

== History ==
The first cars were a 746 cc cyclecar and a 1492 cc V-twin-engined light car both previously sold as Chotas. The engines were to Buckingham's own design and were water-cooled.

Production was suspended during World War I and during the conflict Captain Buckingham, the company owner, gained fame as the inventor of the tracer bullet, which was used against airships.

In 1920 he returned to car production with a new model using an air-cooled version of the pre war V-twin engine but now with a capacity of 1096 cc, a two-speed gearbox and belt drive to the rear axle. A three-speed gearbox was fitted from 1922 with shaft drive and a rear axle incorporating a differential. Front suspension was by a transverse leaf spring and the rear by quarter elliptic leaf springs. The two-seat bodies were made by the coachbuilder Charlesworth.

A coupé version was called the "Palace".

From 1922 to 1923 manufacture of the car was undertaken by Alvis but it is estimated that they only made about 30 of the cars.

== Popular culture ==
- The Adventures of Ozzie and Harriet, 1959's "The Buckingham" (S07•E32) episode in which Ricky and David buy one and later regret the high costs and low gas mileage. The vehicle in fact was not a Buckingham, but rather a 1939 Lagonda V12 drophead coupé, the most expensive car at 1939's 40th Anniversary of the New York International Motor Show, which the Ozzie filmmakers misidentified as a Buckingham.

== See also ==
- List of car manufacturers of the United Kingdom
