= Chota (automobile) =

The Chota was a 6 hp English cyclecar manufactured from 1912 until 1913 by the Buckingham Engine Works of Coventry. Chota is Hindustani for "small".

The car was designed by J. F. Buckingham and had a 746 cc single-cylinder engine of Buckingham's own design. A larger 1492 cc model was added in 1913.

The Chota was renamed the Buckingham in September 1913.

== Sources ==
- David Burgess Wise, The New Illustrated Encyclopedia of Automobiles.
