= Lagonda =

British luxury car marque owned by Aston Martin

- Product type: Automotive marque
- Current owner: Aston Martin
- Country: United Kingdom
- Introduced: 1906
- Previous owners: Wilbur Gunn (1906); Alan P. Good (1935); David Brown/Aston Martin (1947)
- Ambassador: Lapiana Massimo (Lagonda brand Director)
- Website: astonmartinlagonda.com

Lagonda is a British luxury car brand established in 1906, which has been owned by Aston Martin since 1947. The trade-name has not had a continuous commercial existence, being dormant several times, most recently from 1995 to 2008, 2010 to 2013, and 2016 onward.

== History ==
=== Establishment ===
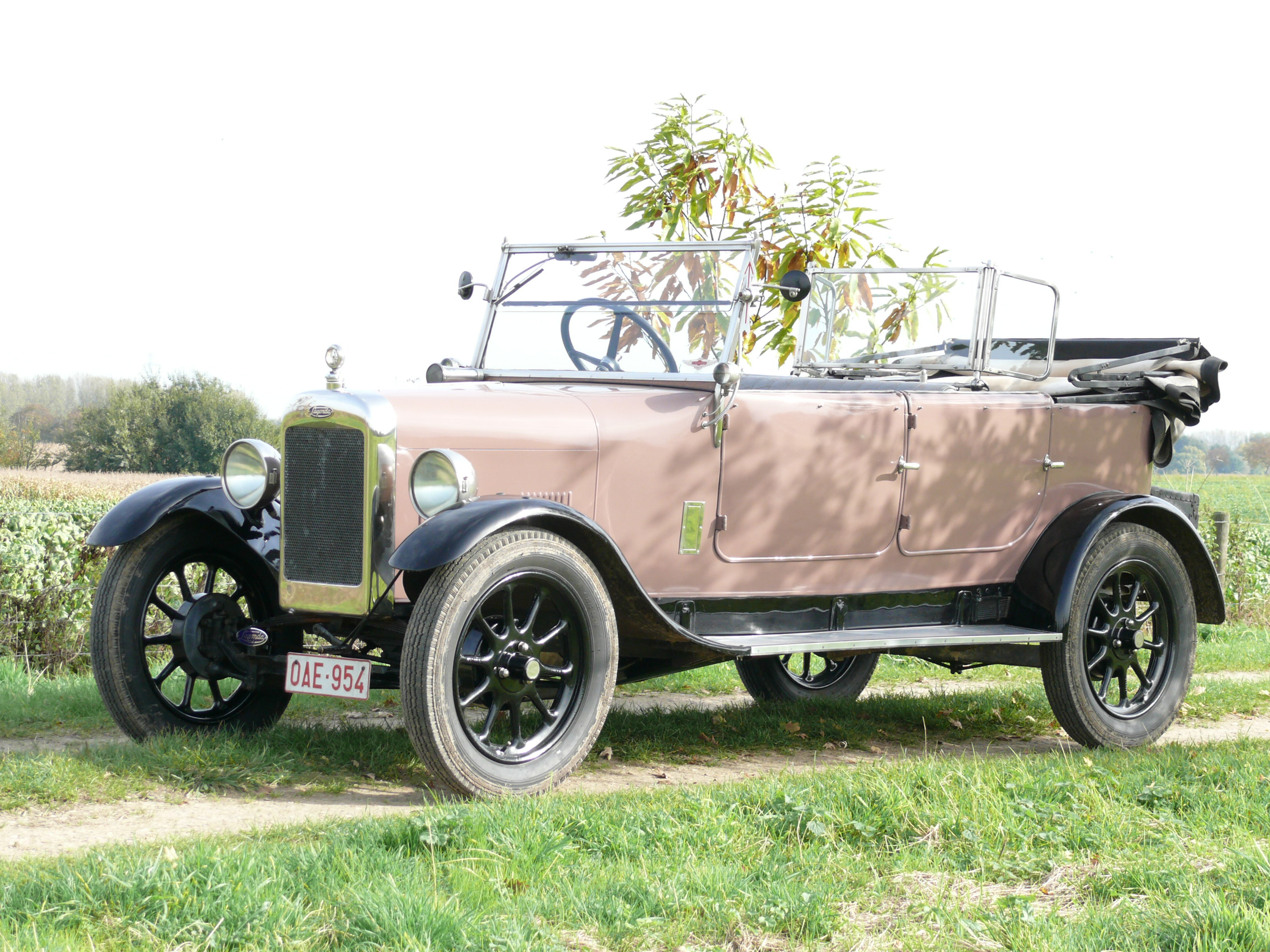
12-24 LC 1925

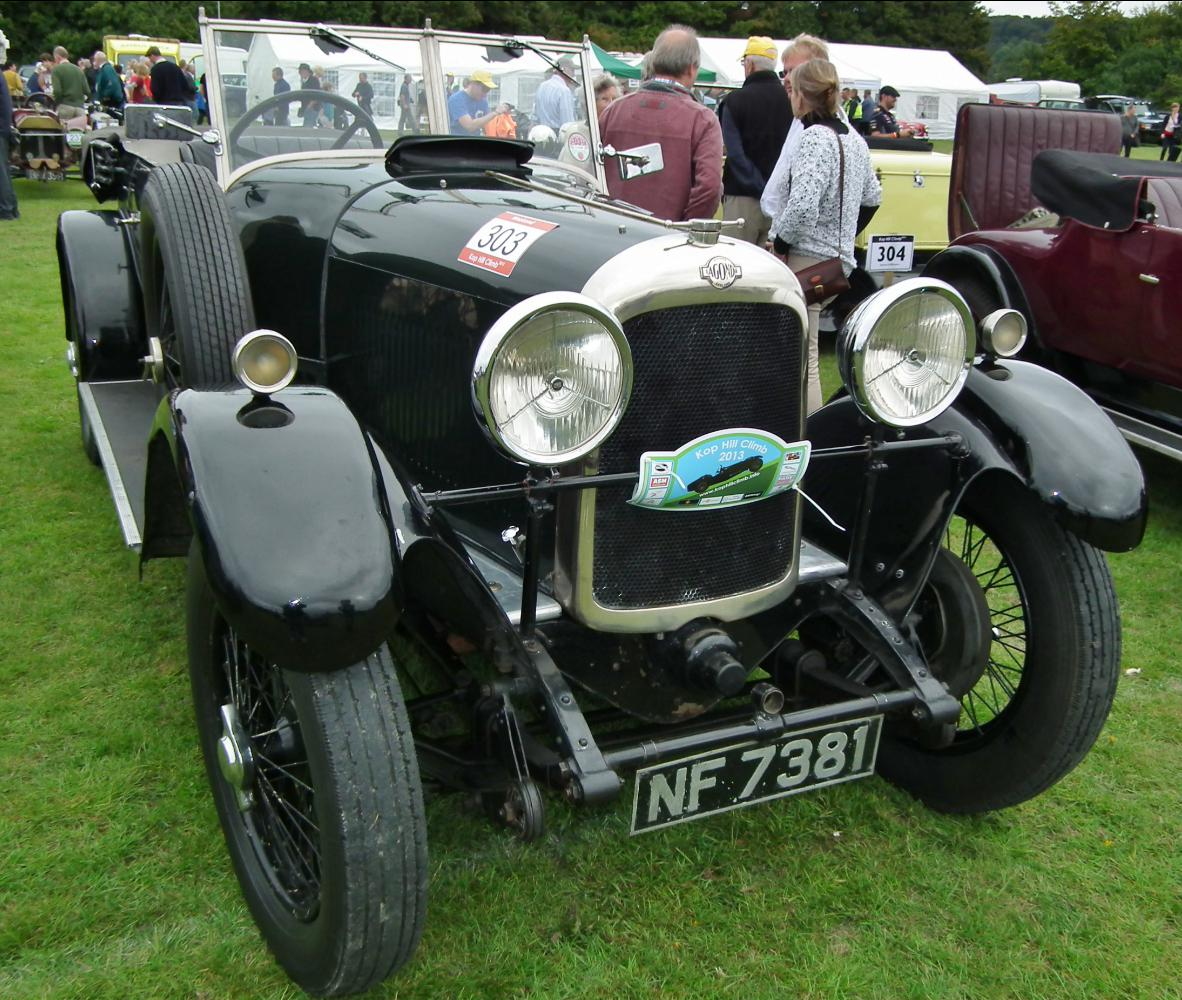
2½-litre 16-65 1927

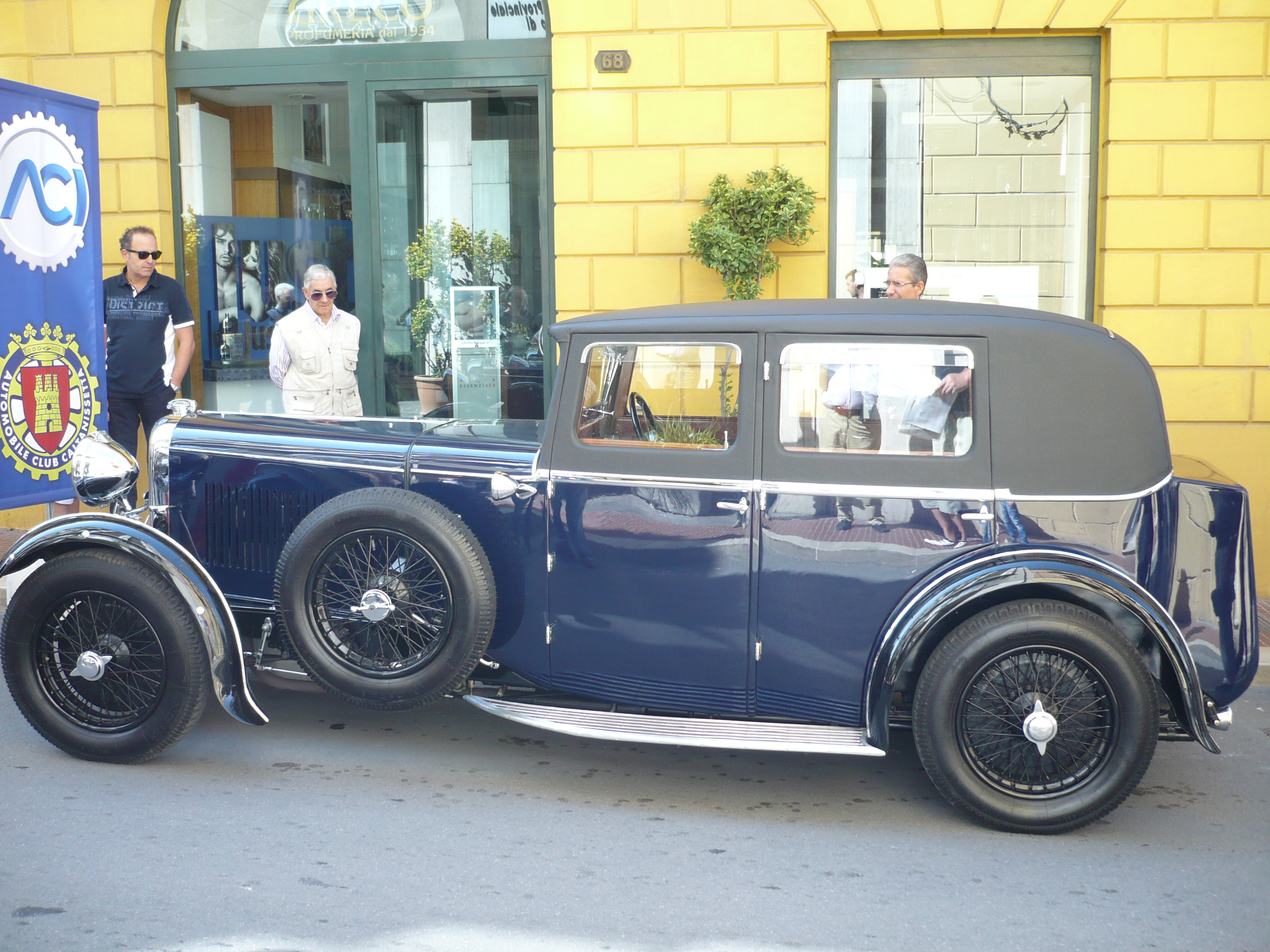
2-litre 16-80 Weymann saloon c.1930

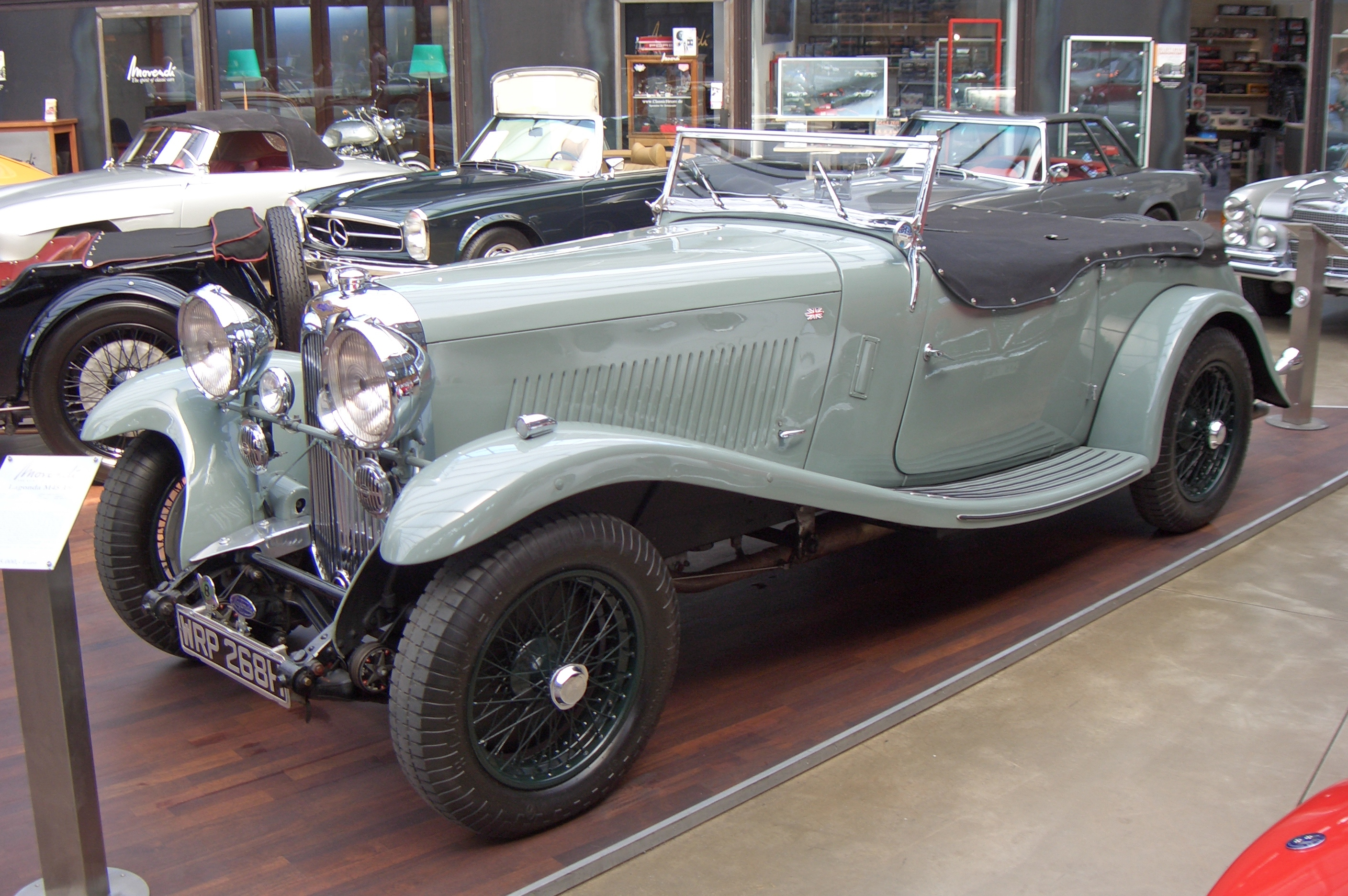
4½-litre M45 sports tourer, 1934

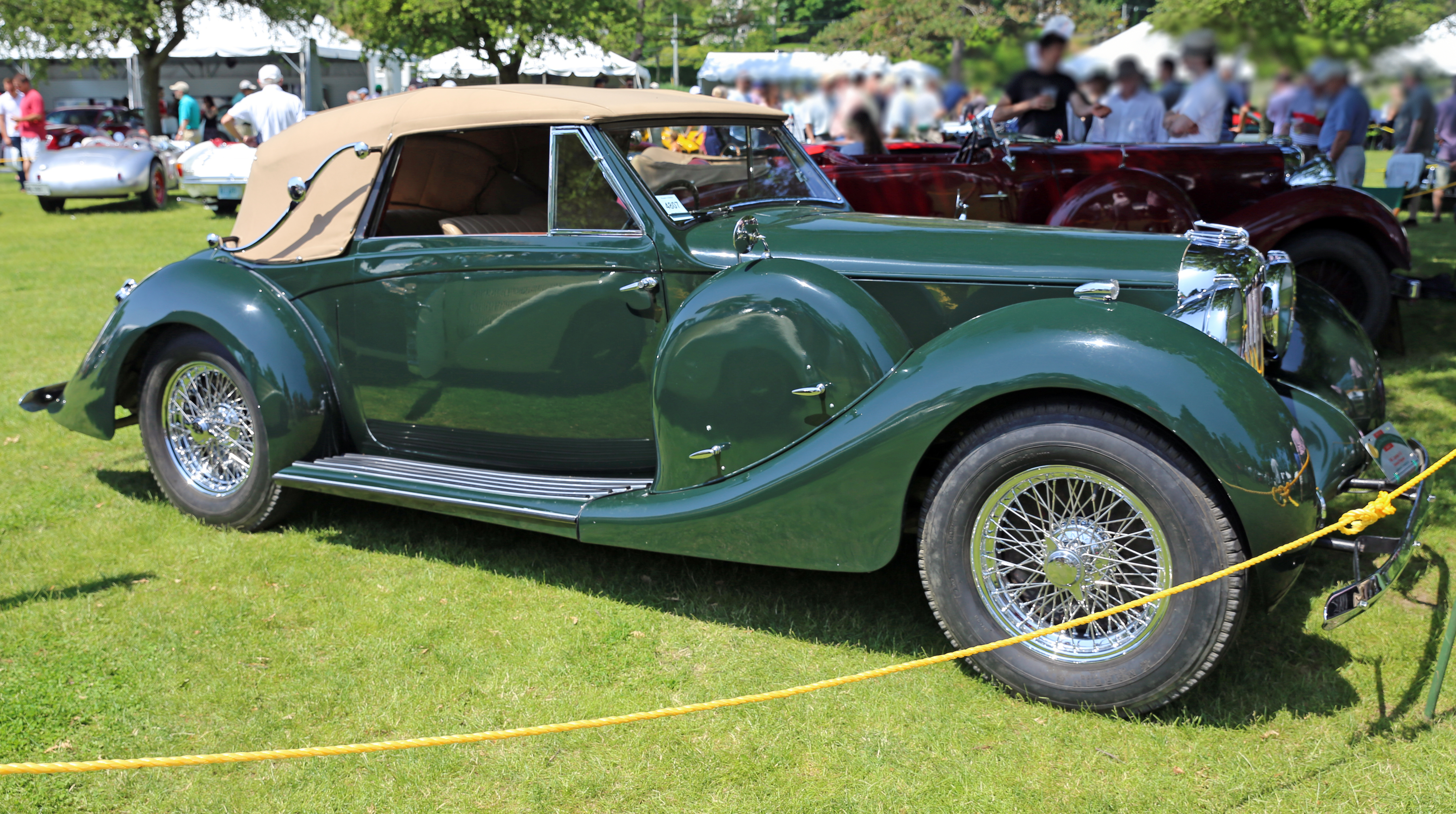
4½-litre Lagonda V12 drophead coupé 1940

The Lagonda company was founded in 1906 in the UK in Staines, Middlesex, by American-born Wilbur Gunn (1859–1920), a former opera singer. He became a British national in 1891 and worked as a speedboat and motorcycle engineer in Staines. He named the company after the Shawnee settlement of Lagonda in his hometown of Springfield, Ohio.

Gunn had built motorcycles on a small scale in the garden of his house in Staines with reasonable success, including a win on the 1905 London–Edinburgh trial. In 1907 he launched his first car, the 20 hp, six-cylinder Torpedo, which he used to win the Moscow–St. Petersburg trial of 1910. This success produced a healthy order for exports to Russia, which continued until 1914. In 1913, Lagonda introduced an advanced small car, the 11.1, with a four-cylinder 1,099 cc engine, which, by 1914, featured a panhard rod suspension and a rivetted unibody body and the first ever fly-off handbrake.

During the First World War the Lagonda company made artillery shells.

=== Between the wars ===
After the end of the war the 11.1 continued with a larger, 1.4-litre engine and standard electric lighting as the 11.9 until 1923 and the updated 12 until 1926. Following Wilbur Gunn's death in 1920, three existing directors headed by Colin Parbury took charge. The first of the company's sports models was launched in 1925 as the 14/60 with a twin-cam 1,954 cc four-cylinder engine and hemispherical combustion chambers. The car was designed by Arthur Davidson who had come from Lea-Francis. A higher output engine came in 1927 with the two-litre Speed model which could be had supercharged in 1930. A lengthened chassis version, the 16/65, with a six-cylinder 2.4-litre engine, was available from 1926 to 1930. Their final car of the 1920s was the three-litre using a 2,931 cc six-cylinder engine. This continued until 1933 when the engine grew to 3,181 cc; this model was also available with a complex eight-speed Maybach transmission as the Selector Special.

A new model for 1933 was the 16–80 using a two-litre Crossley engine with preselector gearbox from 1934. A new small car, the Rapier came along in 1934 with a 1,104 cc engine and pre-selector gearbox. This lasted until 1935 but more were made until 1938 by a separate company, D. Napier & Son of Hammersmith, London. At the other extreme was the near 100 mph (161 km/h) 4.5-litre M45 with a Meadows-supplied six-cylinder, 4.5 L (4,453 cc; 271.7 cu in) engine. A true sporting version, the M45R Rapide, with a tuned M45 engine and a shorter chassis, achieved a controversial Le Mans victory in 1935. Also in 1935, the three-litre grew to a 3.5-litre.

All was not well financially, however, and the receiver was called in 1935, but the company was bought by Alan P. Good, who just outbid Rolls-Royce. He also persuaded W. O. Bentley to leave Rolls-Royce and join Lagonda as designer along with many of his racing department staff. The 4.5-litre range became the LG45 with lower but heavier bodies and also available in LG45R Rapide form. The LG45 came in three versions known as Sanction 1, 2, and 3 each with more Bentley touches to the engine. In 1938 the LG6, a revised LG45 with independent front suspension by torsion bar and with hydraulic brakes, came in.

Along with ex-Rolls-Royce employees, Stuart Tresillian and Charles Sewell, and design expert Frank Feeley, Bentley hid distaste for the primitive conditions of Lagonda's factory, and got to work on the new engine that was to become his masterpiece, the Lagonda V-12 engine, launched in 1937. The 4,480 cc engine delivered 180 bhp (134 kW) and was said to be capable of going from 7 to 105 mph (11 to 169 km/h) in top gear and to rev to 5,000 rpm. The Lagonda V12 automobile was exhibited at the 1939 New York Motor Show: "The highest price car in the show this year is tagged $8,900. It is a Lagonda, known as the "Rapide" model, imported from England. The power plant is a twelve-cylinder V engine developing 200 horsepower."

=== Lagonda at war ===
Richard Watney was managing director of Lagonda at the start of the Second World War:

He was Rootes' retail sales manager for the London area until 1935, when he became managing director of Lagonda Ltd. He was a production expert, who during the war organised and controlled for Lagonda one of the largest British gun production plants, and also plants which produced 50,000 25 lb shells a day. Watney also developed and produced the "Crocodile" and "Wasp" flame-throwing equipment for armoured vehicles."

Watney finished second at Le Mans in 1930 driving a Bentley. He returned to Rootes in 1946, and was posted to Australia. He was killed in a car accident in Melbourne in 1949.

=== Aston Martin ownership ===
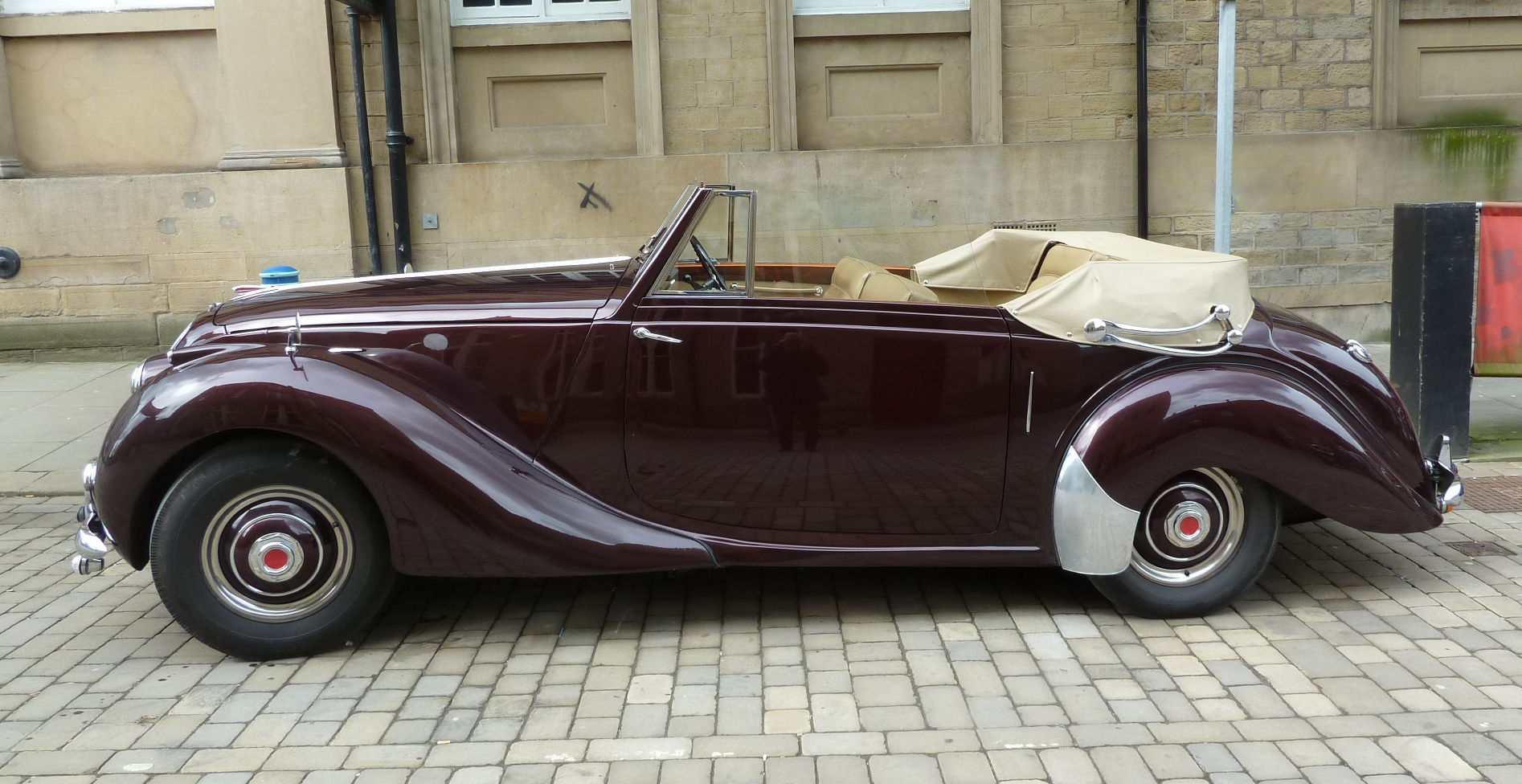
2.6-litre drophead coupé by Tickford, 1953

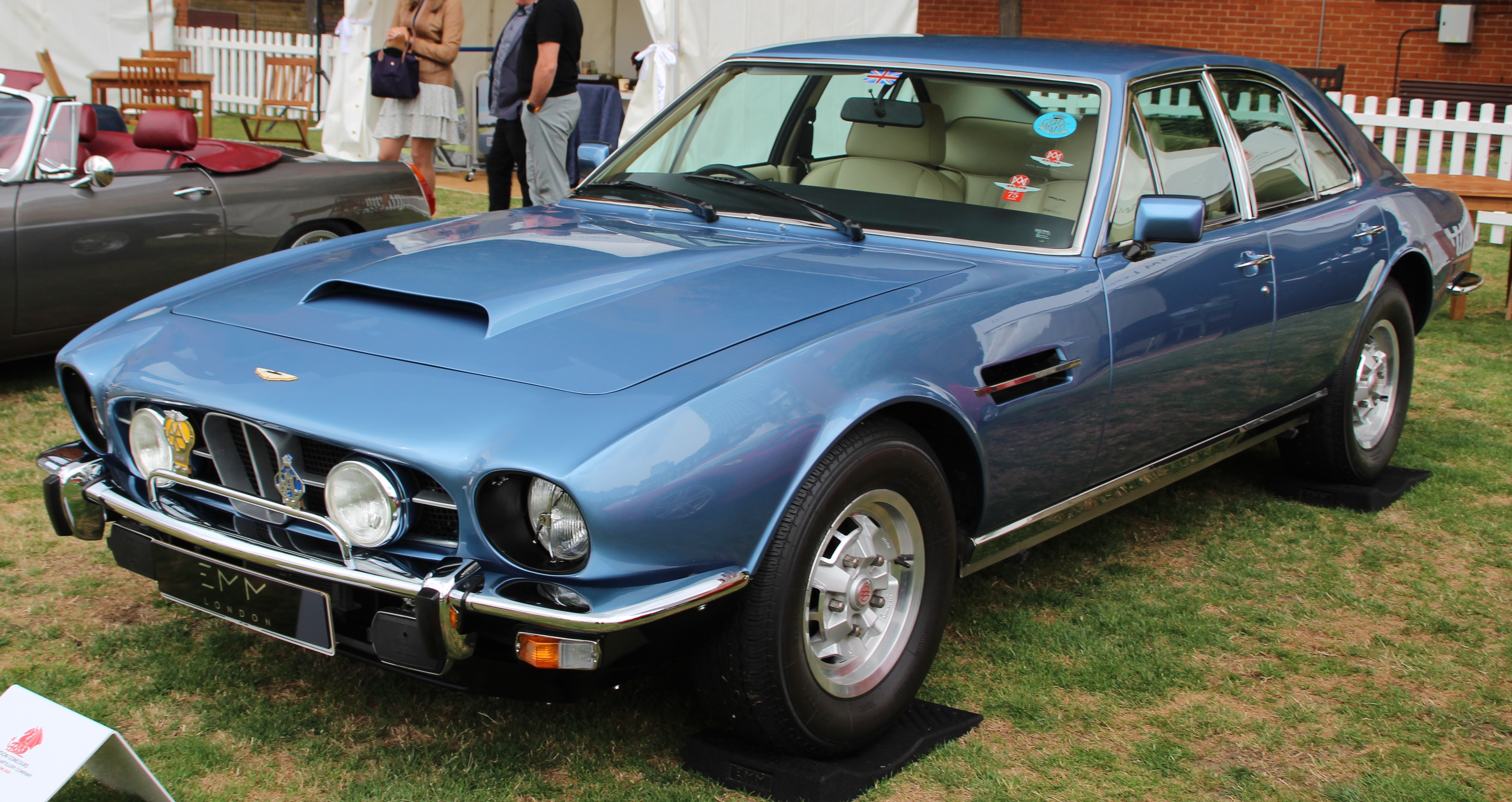
The (1974–1976) Aston Martin Lagonda – a stretched A.M. V8

In 1947, the company was taken over by David Brown and moved in with Aston Martin, which he had also bought, in Feltham, Middlesex. The old Staines works at Egham Hythe passed to Petters Limited, in which A.P. Good had acquired the controlling interest. Production restarted with the last prototypes from Bentley, the 1948 Lagonda 2.6-Litre with new chassis featuring fully independent suspension. Its new 2.6L twin overhead cam straight-six became the basis for the Aston Martin engines of the 1950s. This was replaced by the 3 litre Lagonda engine in 1953 and continued to be available until 1958.

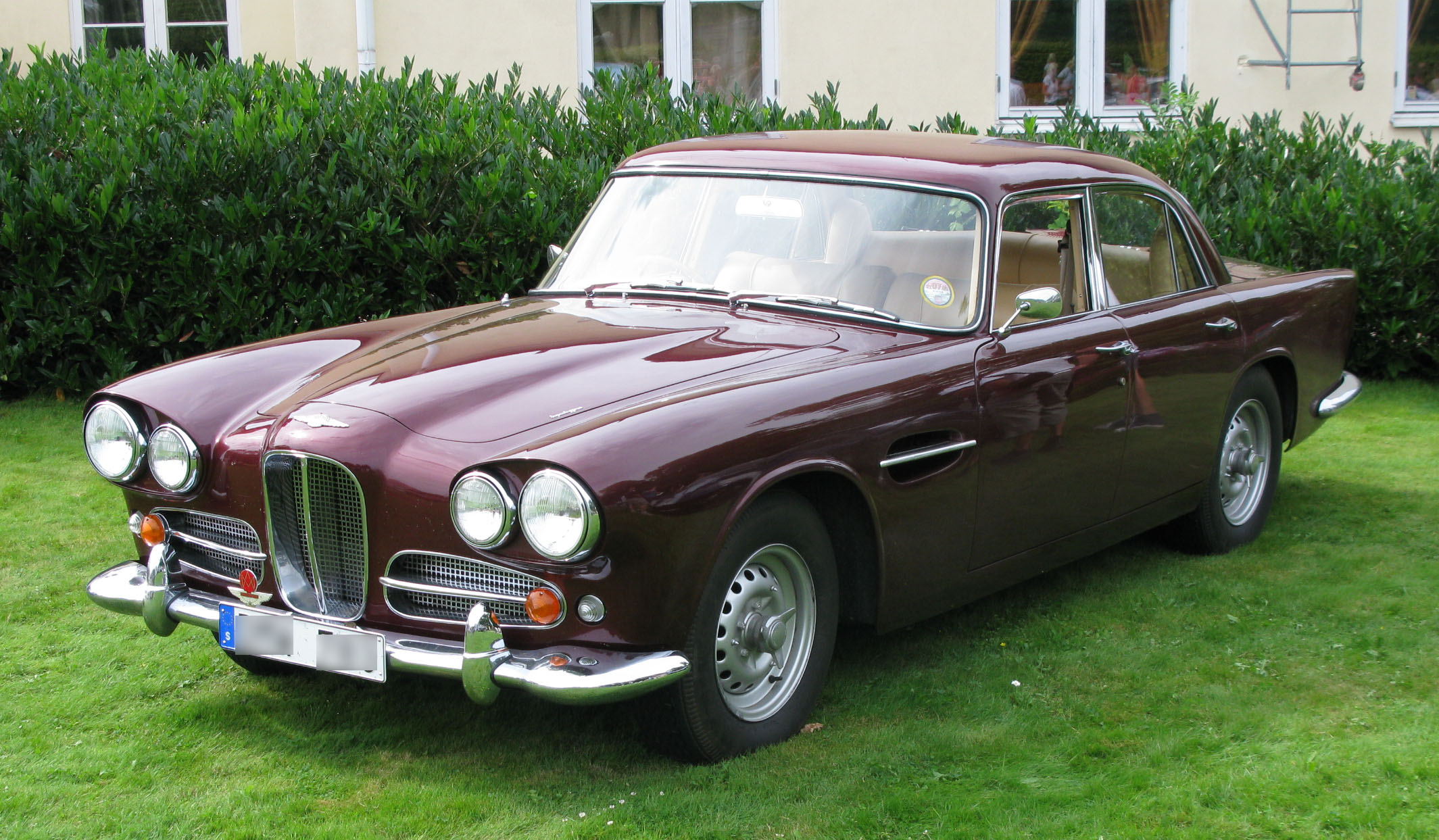
Rapide, 1964

Many thought that the marque had disappeared, but in 1961 the Rapide name was resurrected, with a four-door saloon based on the contemporary Aston Martin DB4, with an aluminium body by Carrozzeria Touring of Milan and a 3,995 cc engine capable of taking the car to 125 mph (201 km/h). By this time, Aston Martin-Lagonda as it had become, had moved to Newport Pagnell in Buckinghamshire. The Rapide lasted until 1965.

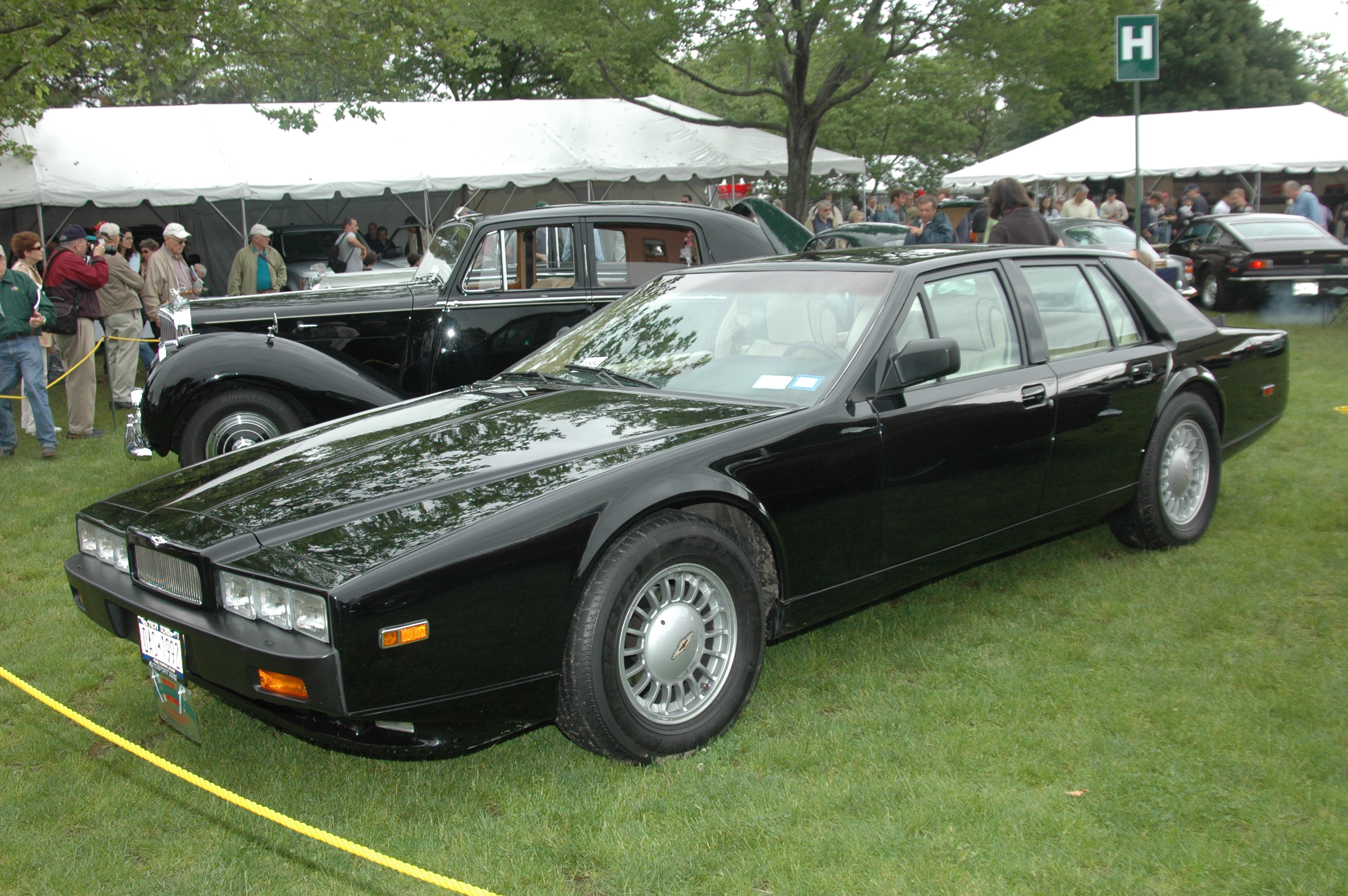
Aston Martin Lagonda, 1989

In 1969, the Lagonda name was briefly resurrected, appearing on a four-door prototype of the new Aston Martin DBS model. The prototype was allocated chassis MP230/1, and was retained by the factory until 1972 and used by Sir David Brown as his personal car, registered "JPP 5G". The car originally ran a prototype five-litre V8 engine but this was quickly replaced by an early 5.3-litre production quad carb version (VS4008EE).

Between 1974 and 1976, seven Lagonda four-door saloons were produced based on the 1969 prototype. The production models adopted a single-headlight treatment with a Lagonda "horseshoe" grille in place of the twin-headlamp treatment of the prototype.

In 1976, a new Lagonda saloon appeared, the large and futuristic Aston Martin Lagonda designed by William Towns. This low, rather square, wedge-shaped car was built on Aston Martin V8 components and was available until 1990. A total of 645 were built.

Aston Martin produced a concept car called the "Lagonda Vignale" at the 1993 Geneva Motor Show.

During 1993–94, nine Lagonda four-door saloons and seven shooting brakes (badged on the rear door or tailgate as Les Vacances) were made based on a stretched Aston Martin Virage. These were (until the 2018 Vanquish Zagato shooting brake) the only factory-built shooting brakes in Aston Martin's history; six were bought by a foreign royal family. They could be ordered with the 5.3-litre V8 (310 HP) or the 6.3-litre V8 (500 HP) engine.

=== Revival ===
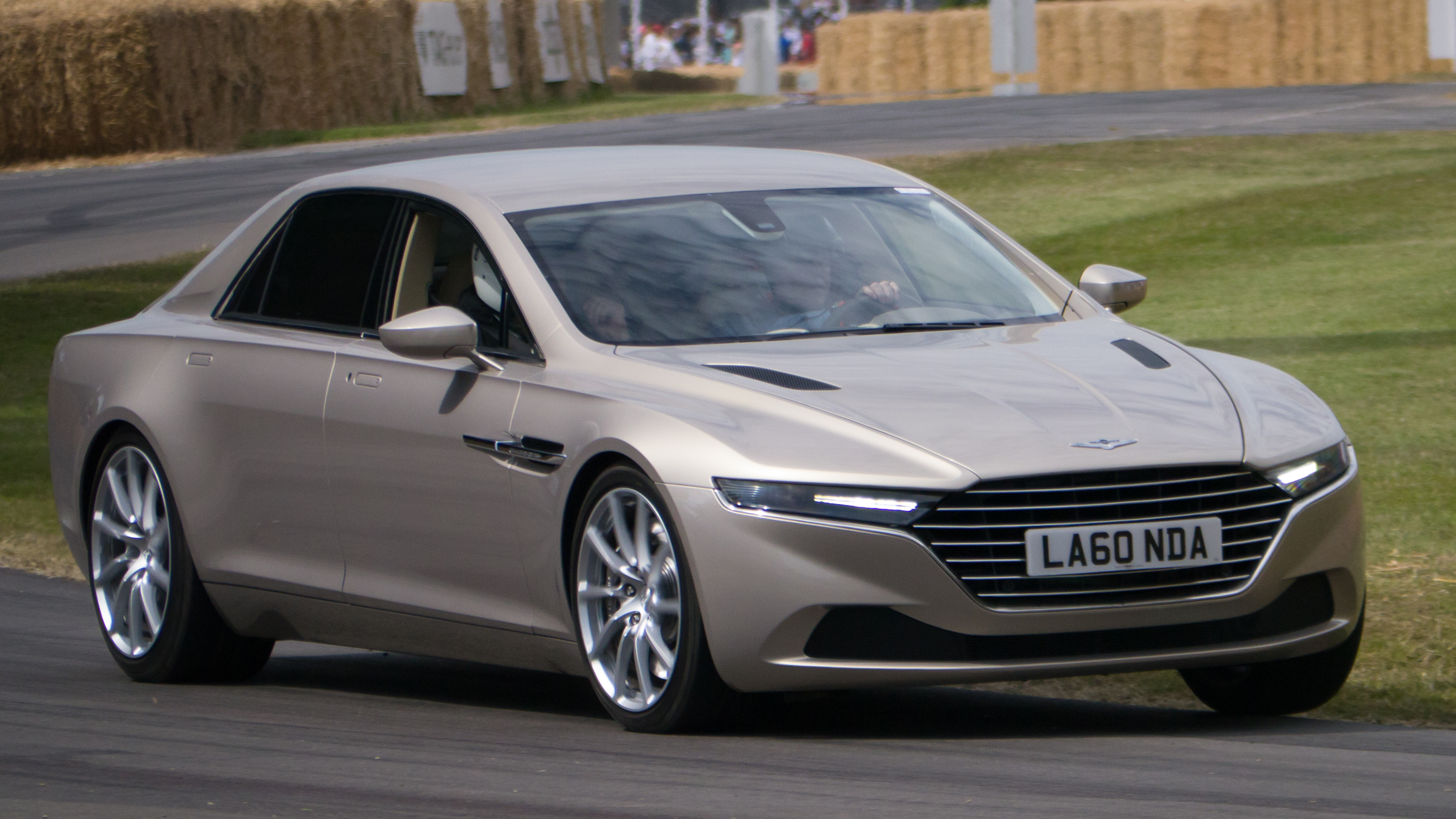
2015 Lagonda Taraf

Aston Martin said on 1 September 2008, as reported by Automotive News Europe, that it would relaunch its Lagonda brand to help it expand into new markets such as luxury saloons and celebrate Lagonda's centennial anniversary in 2009.

"The Lagonda brand would allow us to develop cars which can have a different character than a sports car," said CEO Ulrich Bez in a statement. "Lagonda will have its own niche with luxurious and truly versatile products suitable for both existing and emerging markets".

"Lagonda models would be vehicles that could be used all year round in markets such as Russia where specialized sports cars such as Aston Martins could only be used for three or four months each year", said Aston Martin spokeswoman Janette Green.

At the 2009 Geneva Motor Show, Aston Martin unveiled a 4WD, four-seat SUV to commemorate the 100th anniversary of the first Lagonda car. It includes a V12 engine and 22-inch wheels.

The Rapide name was revived in 2010 as the Aston Martin Rapide saloon.

Aston Martin confirmed the revival of the Lagonda brand on 9 March 2011. The new range was to consist primarily of high-end SUVs. In 2014, however, Aston Martin announced a large, low-bodied saloon version, the Taraf, a £1 million car powered by a normally aspirated V12 producing 565 hp and 465 lb-ft of torque. The Taraf was initially planned to be sold only in the Middle East but was later sold in the UK, Europe and South Africa, with production limited to 200 units.

== Models ==
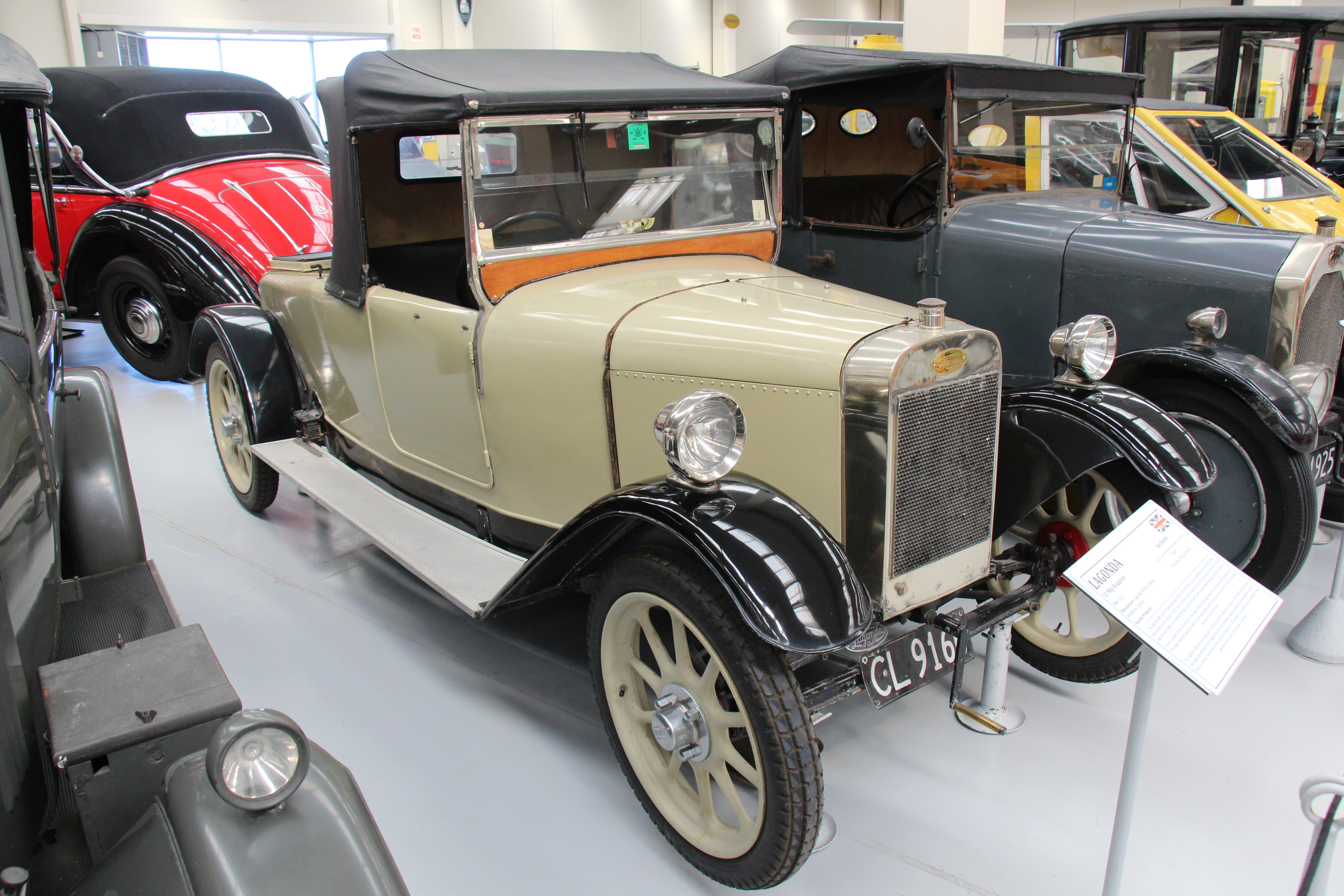
1922 Lagonda 11.9 Roadster

Year	Type	Engine	Production
1906–1913	20	3,052 cc side-valve 4-cylinder	
1911–1913	30	4,578 cc side-valve 4-cylinder	
1913–1921	11	1,099 cc inlet-over-exhaust-valve 4-cylinder	6,000 (11, 11.9, and 12)
1920–1923	11.9	1,421 cc inlet over exhaust valve 4-cylinder	6,000 (11, 11.9, and 12)
1923–1926	12 and 12/24	1,421 cc inlet over exhaust valve 4-cylinder	6,000 (11, 11.9, and 12)
1925–1933	14/60 and 2-litre Speed	1,954 cc ohv 4-cylinder	1,440
1926–1930	16/65	2,389 (later 2,692) cc ohv 6-cylinder	250
1928–1934	3-litre	2,931 cc ohv 6-cylinder	570
1932–1934	16/80	1,991 cc ohv 6-cylinder Crossley	260
1933–1938	Rapier	1,087 cc twin ohc 4-cylinder	470 + app 45 by Rapier Cars
1933–1935	M45	4,453 cc ohv 6-cylinder Meadows	410 + 53 M45R Rapide
1934–1935	M35/3.5-litre	3,619 cc ohv 6-cylinder	65
1935–1937	LG45	4,453 cc ohv 6-cylinder Meadows	278 + 25 Rapides
1937–1940	LG6	4,453 cc ohv 6-cylinder Meadows	85
1938–1940	V12	4,480 cc single overhead cam V12	189
1948–1953	2.6-litre	2,580 cc double ohc 6-cylinder	510
1953–1958	3-litre	2,922 cc double ohc 6-cylinder	270
1961–1964	Rapide	3,995 cc double ohc 6-cylinder	55
1976–1989	Aston Martin Lagonda	5,340 cc ohc V8	645
2015–2016	Taraf	5,935 cc V12	200

== In popular culture ==
- A 1939 Lagonda LG6 Rapide Drophead Coupé was featured in the 1960 Twilight Zone episode, "A Thing About Machines".
- Lady Eileen ("Bundle") drives a Lagonda in the first episode of The Seven Dials, a Netflix production, in 2026.
- Lord Peter drives a Lagonda in Whose Body? by Dorothy Sayers.
- Captain Hastings, a character in the Agatha Christie Poirot detective series, drives a Lagonda.
- Cary Grant drives a Lagonda in Alfred Hitchcock's Suspicion (1941 film).

== See also ==
- David Brown Ltd.
- List of car manufacturers of the United Kingdom
