= Lagonda V12 =

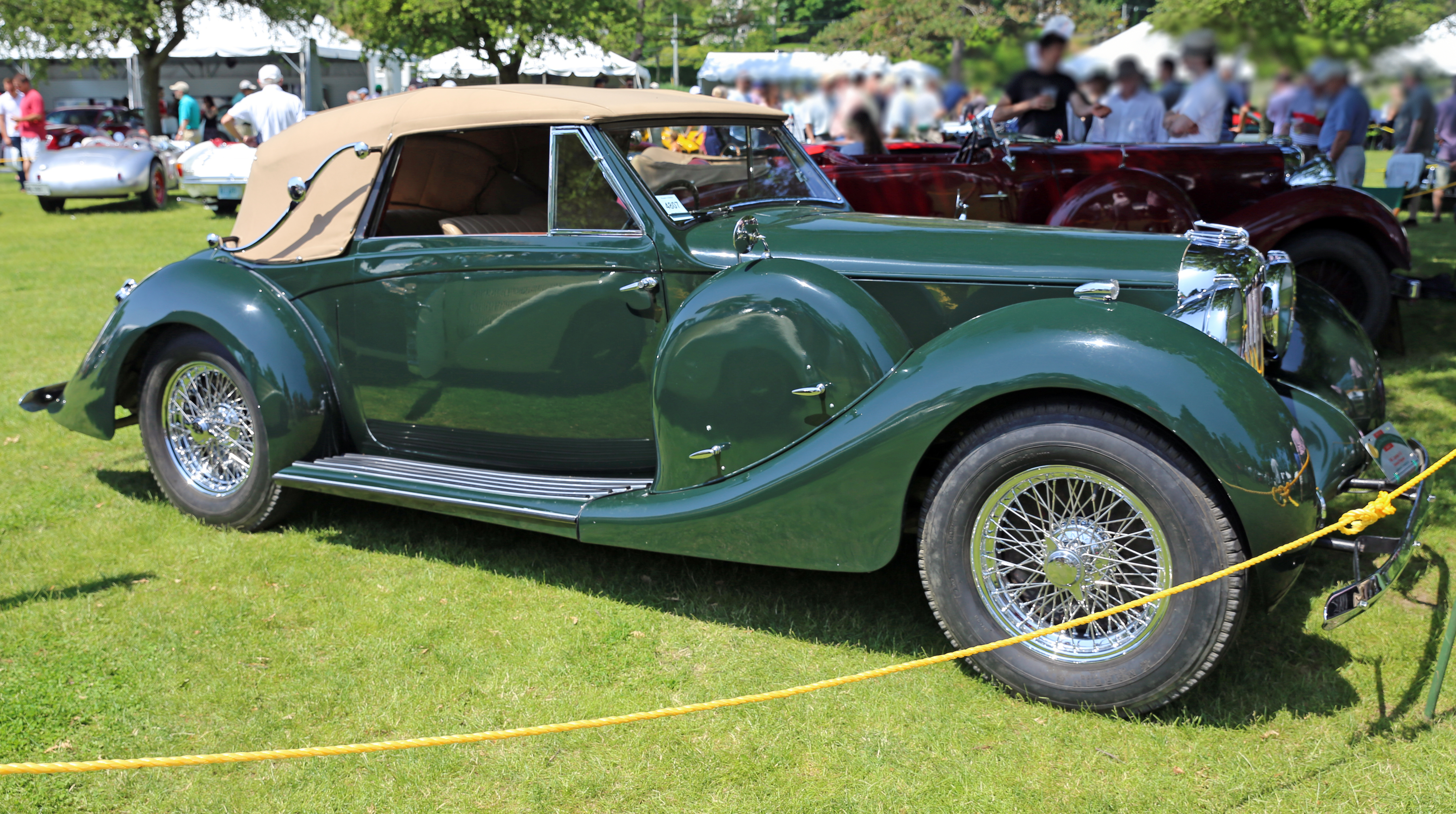
- 1940 Lagonda V12

Overview
- Manufacturer: Lagonda
- Production: 1938–1940; 189 produced

Body and chassis
- Body style: tourer saloon coupe limousine
- Related: Lagonda LG6

Powertrain
- Engine: 4.5 L Lagonda SOHC V12
- Transmission: 4-speed manual

Dimensions
- Wheelbase: 124 in (3,150 mm); 132 in (3,353 mm); 138 in (3,505 mm)
- Length: typically 206 in (5,232 mm), depending on coachwork
- Width: 72 in (1,829 mm)

The Lagonda V12 is a large luxury car produced by the British Lagonda company from 1938 until 1940. It was first shown at the 1936 London Motor Show but production did not commence until 1938. A Lagonda V12 Rapide was the most expensive car shown at the 1939 40th Anniversary show of the New York International Motor Show, offered at US$8,900 ($206,000 in 2025).

== Description ==
=== Engine ===
The V12 model featured an all new 4480 cc 60 degree V12 engine designed during the tenure of W. O. Bentley at Lagonda. The design concepts of the engine follow those established by Stewart Tresilian during his time at Rolls Royce and Tresilian, who followed W. O. Bentley from RR to Lagonda, is generally credited as having been responsible for its design. The engine has a combined cylinder block and upper crankcase cast in iron with a light alloy lower crankcase. The cylinder heads are cast iron. Each bank of six cylinders has its own single overhead camshaft, chain driven, and its own distributor driven from the back of the camshaft. Twin, downdraught SU carburettors are located between the engine blocks. 180 hp (134 kW) is developed at 5000 rpm.

The engine is connected to a four-speed gearbox with centrally mounted change lever.

=== Chassis ===
The chassis was also new and features independent torsion bar front suspension and live rear axle with hypoid final drive. The braking system is Lockheed hydraulic.

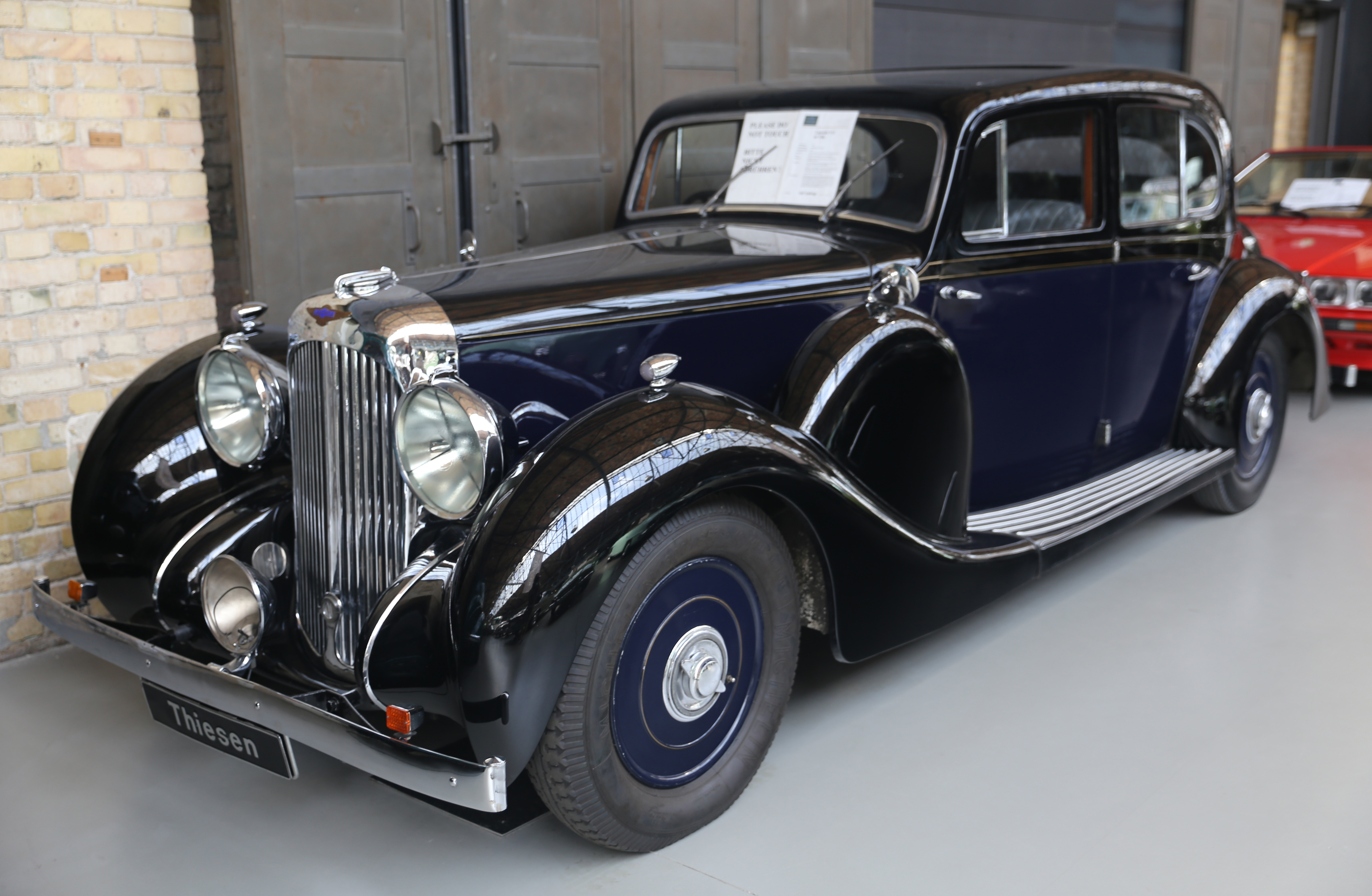
One of ten examples built on the longest wheelbase, a 1939 de Ville

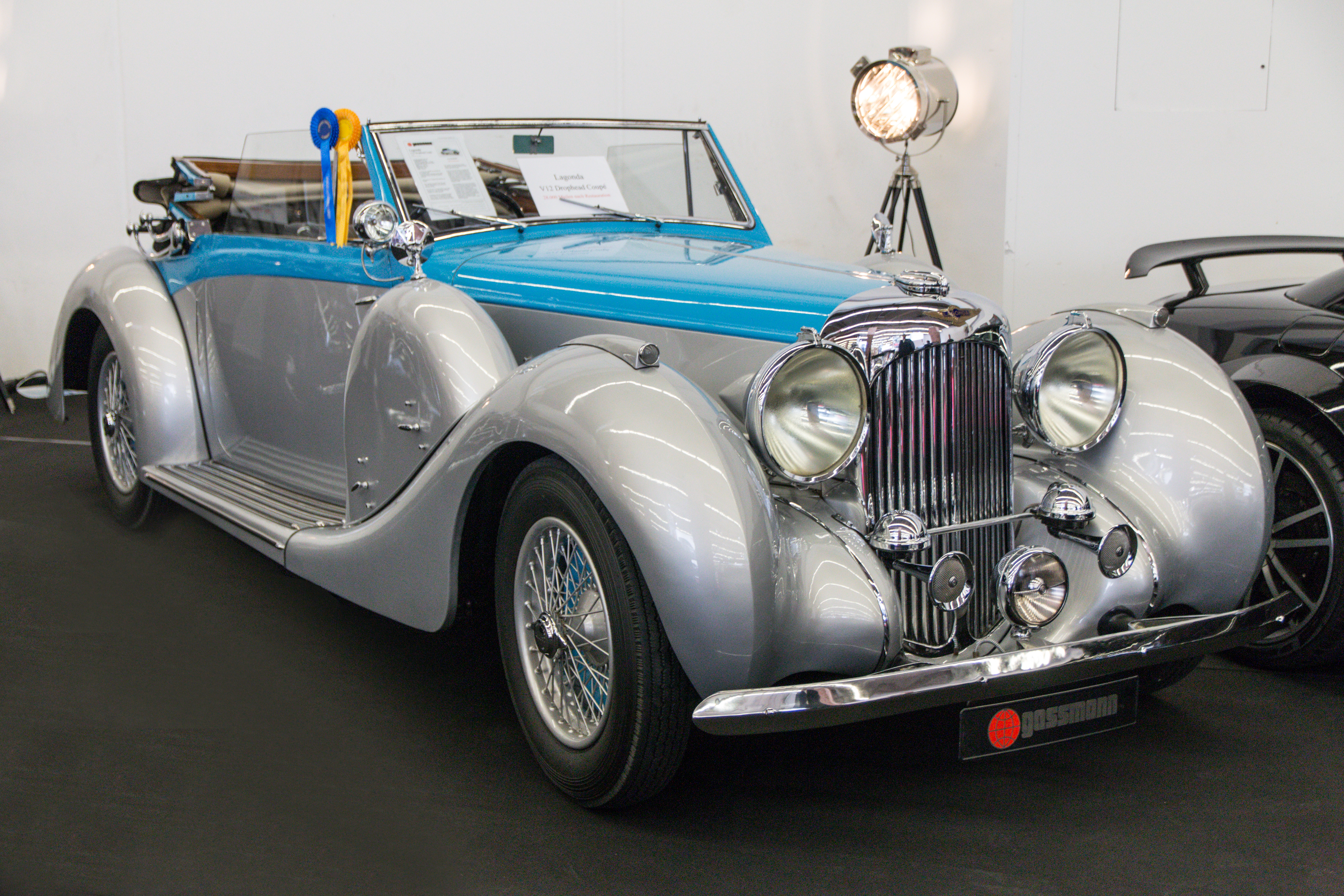
Lagonda V12 Drophead Coupé

Coachwork could be by Lagonda or a number of independent coachbuilders and to suit various body designs a wheelbase of 124 in (3,150 mm), 132 in (3,353 mm), or 138 in (3,505 mm) could be specified. Only ten cars were built with the longest bodywork.

=== Performance ===
Even with the ponderous Saloon de Ville body the car could reach 100 mph (161 km/h). Autocar recorded a maximum speed of 103.45 mph (166.5 km/h) around Brooklands in their March 1938 road test of the Short Chassis Saloon.

Two modified V12s with four carburettor engines were entered for the 1939 24 Hours of Le Mans where they finished third and fourth.

== In popular culture ==
A 1939 version of the Drophead coupé was featured in an episode of The Twilight Zone called "A Thing About Machines" as a car possessed, terrorizing the main character. The car was driven by stuntmen ducking below the dash or by drivers dressed in all black or white to portray the car as driverless, chasing Mr. Finchley to his death.

A drophead coupé version of the vehicle was featured in a 1959 episode of The Adventures of Ozzie and Harriet in which it was intentionally misidentified as a Buckingham, which had ceased production in 1923. The episode took the name of the mistaken identity: "The Buckingham" (S07•E32). The purchase of the vehicle was a joint venture between brothers David and Rick who lamented the allegedly high maintenance costs and low gas mileage of the vehicle.

The Lagonda V12 featured prominently in Roald Dahl's adult books My Uncle Oswald and the short story The Visitor (in the collection Switch Bitch). In the stories Dahl discusses taking delivery of a 1938 Lagonda with custom coachwork and a set of horns that play Mozart's "son gia mille e tre" in perfect pitch and seats "upholstered in fine-grain alligator and the panelling to be veneered in yew... because I prefer the colour and grain of English yew to that of any other wood".
