= Tax horsepower =

Taxation measure based on engine size

The fiscal / taxable horsepower or just tax horsepower was an early system to calculate road taxation rates for automobiles in a number of key Western European countries such as the UK, Germany, France, Belgium and Italy. Some U.S. states like Illinois also charged license plate purchase and renewal fees for passenger automobiles, based on taxable horsepower. The tax horsepower rating was typically computed not from actual engine power but by mathematical formulae based on cylinder dimensions etc, and varying per country. In the early twentieth century, fiscal power was reasonably close to real power – but as the internal combustion engine developed, real power output outpaced nominal taxable power by a factor of up to ten or more.

== Britain ==
The so-called RAC horsepower rating was devised in 1910 by the RAC at the invitation of the British government. The formula is:

$$\frac{D \times D \times n}{2.5}$$

where:

$D$ is the diameter (or bore) of the cylinder in inches,
$n$ is the number of cylinders

The formula was calculated from total piston surface area (i.e., "bore" only). The factor of 2.5 accounts for characteristics that were widely seen in engines at the time, such as a mean effective pressure in the cylinder of 90 psi (620 kPa) and a maximum piston speed of 1,000 feet per minute (5.1 m/s).

The system introduced a somewhat progressive way of taxing higher-value cars more than low-cost ones but was also introduced to protect the domestic British motor industry from foreign imports, especially the Ford Model T. Henry Ford's mass production methods meant that the Model T was competitively priced with British-built cars despite being a much larger, more durable and more powerful car than other available similarly-priced models. In 1912 Ford opened a factory to build Model Ts in Manchester, to circumvent the import tariffs that, up to that point, had increased the effective price of foreign cars. Under the RAC's formula the Model T was a 22 'tax horsepower' car, making it more expensive to run than its British-built rivals on sale for the same price.

At first the RAC rating was usually representative of the car's actual (brake) horsepower, but as engine design and technology progressed in the 1920s and 1930s these two figures began to diverge, with engines making much more power than their RAC ratings suggested: by 1924 the 747 cc (45.6 cu in) engine of the Austin Seven (named for its 7 hp rating) produced 10.5 brake horsepower (7.8 kW), 50 percent more than its official rating.

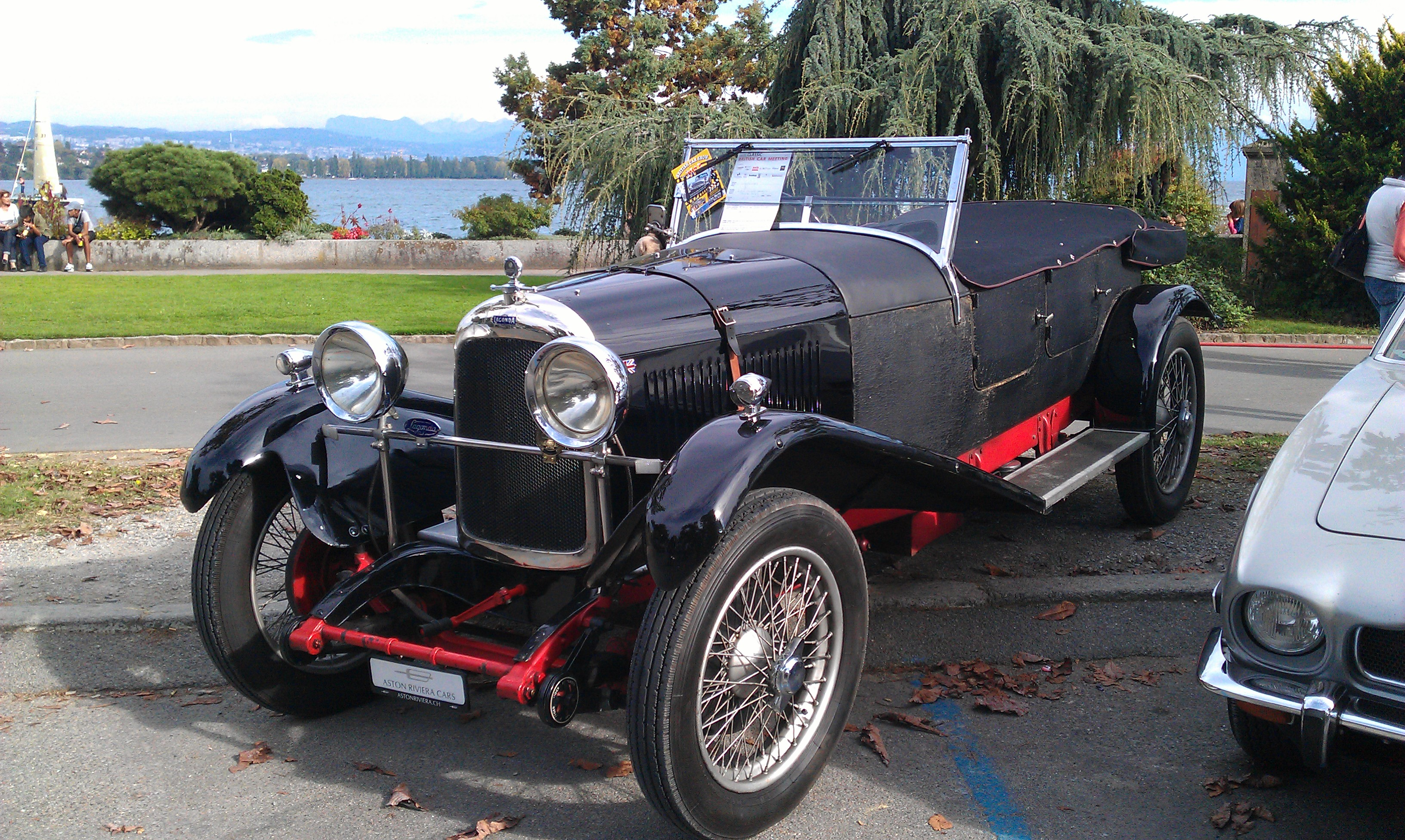
Lagonda 14/60 This 2-litre car from 1925 was taxed based on a Fiscal horsepower rating of 14 (actually 12.9), whilst the engine output was approximately 60 bhp.

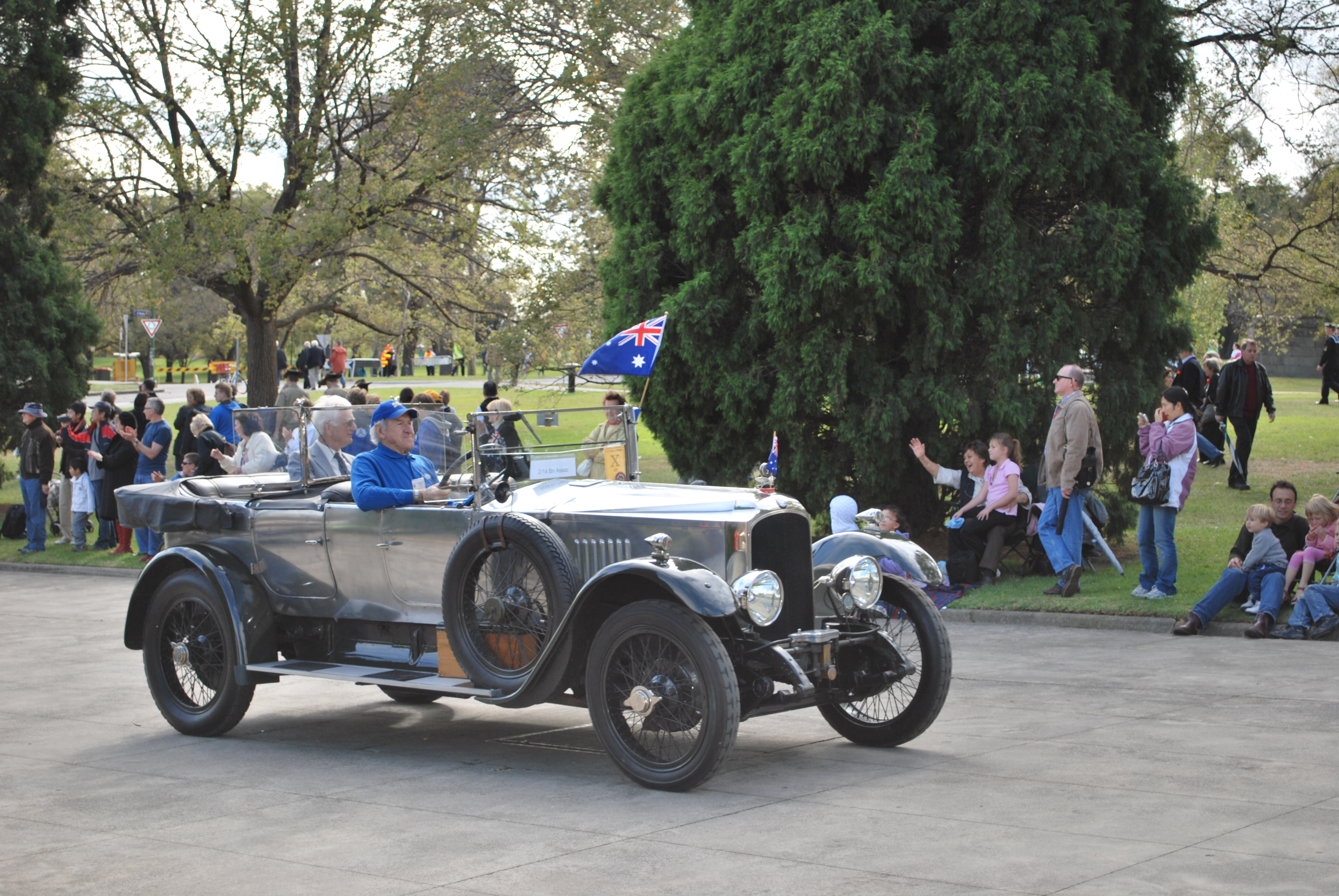
A Vauxhall 23-60 from 1922, with a 4-litre engine, attracting 23 hp in terms of tax, but producing 60 bhp at 2000rpm

It became common for the name of a model to include both its RAC tax horsepower and its actual power output, such as the Wolseley 14/60 and the Alvis 12/70 of 1938.

To minimise tax ratings British designers developed engines with very long stroke and low piston surface area. Another effect was the multiplicity of models: Sevens, Eights, Nines, Tens, Elevens, Twelves, Fourteens, Sixteens etc., each to fit with a taxation class. Larger, more lightly stressed engines may have been equally economical to run and, in less variety, produced much more economically. The system discouraged manufacturers from switching to more fuel-efficient overhead valve engines as these generally required larger bores, while the established sidevalve layout could easily use very narrow bores. Despite OHV engines having significant benefits in economy, refinement and performance, the RAC system made these engines more expensive to own because it placed them in a higher tax class than sidevalve engines of identical power output. Despite this, by 1935 the Standard Flying Twelve, a typical mid-size saloon, produced 44 bhp (45 PS; 33 kW) from a 1.6-litre (98 cu in) engine, nearly four times as much power as the RAC system suggested.

While the RAC system had protected the home market from the import of large-engined low-priced mass-produced American cars, the need for roomy generously proportioned cars for export was now paramount and the British government abandoned the tax horsepower system with effect from 1 January 1947 replacing it at first with a tax on cubic capacity, which was in turn replaced by a flat tax applying from 1 January 1948. However British cars and cars in other countries applying the same approach to automobile taxation continued to feature long, relatively narrow cylinders even in the 1950s and 1960s, partly because limited investment meant that new car models often had new bodies but their engines were carried over from earlier generations.

The emphasis on long strokes, combined with the nature of British roads in the pre-motorway era, meant that British engines tended to deliver strong low- and mid-range torque for their size, but low maximum speeds. The long stroke also meant that piston speeds and the load on the big end bearings became potentially damaging at high power outputs. Many smaller British cars did not cope well with sustained cruising at 60 mph (97 km/h) or more, which led to reliability problems when the vehicles were exported to other markets, especially the United States. Cars such as the Austin A40, the Morris Minor and the Hillman Minx all achieved notable initial sales success in the US in the late 1940s, until the short service life of the engines when asked to routinely drive long distances at freeway speeds became clear. Other imports originating in countries with different tax rules and existent high speed road networks, in particular the Volkswagen Beetle, proved more reliable, and achieved greater sales success.

== Australia ==
In Australia, the various states had their own automobile taxation system. Several depended on the RAC formula, but the flaws of this system were well known as early as 1909. Another formula was the Dendy-Marshall formula, which included an engine's stroke. Several Australian states used Dendy-Marshall, although Western Australia reverted to RAC hp in 1957. The Union of South Africa also depended on Dendy-Marshall, at least in the 1920s. The Automobile Club of Australia's "A.C.A. formula" used the same calculations as did Dendy-Marshall formula. The Australian Bureau of Statistics used RAC hp in their Registration of New Motor Vehicles, Make of Vehicles, Australia statistics until this publication was discontinued in June 1976.

Several Australian states also added vehicle weight to the power rating, to get a power-weight unit which determined taxation.

The Dendy-Marshall / A.C.A. formula is as follows:

$$HP = \frac{D \times D \times L \times n}{12}$$

where:

$HP$ = nominal horsepower
$D$ = the diameter (or bore) of the cylinder in inches
$L$ = the length (or stroke) of the cylinder in inches
$n$ = the number of cylinders

== United States ==
During the early twentieth century, automobiles in the United States were specified with a figure identical to RAC horsepower and computed using the same formula; this was known either as "NACC horsepower" (named for the National Automobile Chamber of Commerce), "ALAM horsepower" (for NACC's predecessor, the Association of Licensed Automobile Manufacturers), or "SAE horsepower" (for the Society of Automotive Engineers). (This last term should not be confused with later horsepower ratings by the SAE.) This value is still used for taxation and license fee purposes in the State of Missouri for passenger vehicles, with electric vehicles assigned to the 12–23 Horsepower bracket by statute.

== Continental Europe ==
Although tax horsepower was computed on a similar basis in several other European countries during the two or three decades before World War II, continental cylinder dimensions were quoted in millimetres. As a result of rounding when converting the formula between the two measurement systems, a British tax horse-power unit ended up being worth 1.014 continental (i.e. French) tax horse-power units.

=== Belgium ===
In Belgium, the tax power depended on the cubic capacity of the engine in cubic centimetres at the rate of 1 tax horse power for every 200 cm^{3} (12 cu in).

=== France ===
The Cheval Fiscal, often abbreviated to CV from "chevaux-vapeur" (literally "steam horses") in tax law, is used for the issuing of French registration certificates known as "cartes grises" ("grey cards"). It is an administrative unit originally calculated partly from the power of the engine and used to calculate the amount of tax that may be due at the time of registration.

The Citroën 2CV (two tax horsepower) was the car that kept such a name for the longest time.

Its use in France dates from 1 January 1913. It was updated in 1956, with further revisions in 1978 and a new emission-based system introduced in 1998.

It was originally defined using the following formula:

$$CV=n\times D ^2\times L\times \omega\times K$$

where:

$n$ is the number of cylinders,
$D$ is the cylinder bore in centimetres,
$L$ is the stroke in centimetres,
$\omega$ is the maximum engine speed in revolutions per second, derived from manufacturers' performance claims,
$K$ is a coefficient depending on the number of cylinders (single-cylinder engine : 0.00020; two-cylinder engine : 0.00017; four-cylinder engine: 0.00015; six-or-more-cylinder engine: 0.00013)

==== 1956 formula ====
In a circular issued on 28 December 1956, the cheval fiscal was defined as:

$P ={K \times n \times D^2 \times L \times \omega}$

where:

$P$ = puissance administrative,
$K$ = constant of 0.00015,
$n$ = number of cylinders,
$D$ = bore in centimetres,
$L$ = stroke in centimetres,
$\omega$ = speed of rotation in revolutions per second

The result is multiplied by 0.7 for a four-stroke, diesel engine (also for wood gas-powered vehicles or those running on CNG). Since $\omega$ and $K$ are both constants while $n$, $D$, and $L$ combine to form the engine's displacement, a commission simplified the formula to:

$$P ={C \times K}$$

where:

$P$ = puissance administrative,
$C$ = displacement in litres (1 L = 1,000 cc or 61.02 cu in),
$K$ = constant of 5.7294 for petrol engines and 4.0106 for diesel engines

==== 1978 formula ====
1978 Engine Speed Parameter Formulas
For calculating $K$, k1, k2... kn represent the theoretical speed in km/h of the vehicle with the engine running at 1000 rpm in 1st, 2nd... nth forward gears. $K$ is a representation of the average speed across the forward gears, with various adjustments added for various transmission types.
Forward speeds	Manual transmissions	Forward speeds	Automatic transmissions (Note: "Automatics" include semi-automatic transmissions.)
3 speeds (or fewer)	$K = \frac{k1 + k2 + k3}{3}$	2-speed	$K = \frac{k1 + k2}{2.7}$
4 speeds	$K = \frac{k1 + k2 + k3 + k4}{4}$	3-speed	$K = \frac{k1 + k2 + k3}{3.48}$
5 speeds	k5 ≤ 1.25*k4: $K = \frac{k1 + k2 + k3 + k5}{4}$	4-speed (Note: The provision for four-speed automatics was added on 15 May 1983.)	k4 ≤ 1.4*k3: $K = \frac{k1 + k2 + k4}{3.48}$
5 speeds	k5 > 1.25*k4: $K = \frac{k1 + k2 + k3 + 1.25\ k4}{4}$	4-speed	k4 > 1.4*k3: $K = \frac{k1 + k2 + 1.4\ k3}{3.48}$
Manual w/ Overdrive	For transmissions with one or more overdrive speeds, the over- drive ratio is only applied to the fourth (top) gear. The calculations are administered as for a five-speed transmission.	CVT	$K = \frac{km + kM}{2.3}$ km and kM represent the velocity at 1000 rpm reached in the lowest and highest available ratios

A new system was announced on 23 December 1977 to come into force on 1 January 1978 calculated by the following formula:

$$P = m \left(0.0458\ \frac{C}{K}\right)^{1.48}$$

where:

$P$ = puissance administrative,
$m$ = coefficient of 1 for petrol or 0.7 for diesel,
$C$ = engine capacity in cubic centimetres,
$K$ = parameter calculated from a weighted arithmetic average speed in kilometres per hour theoretically reached by the vehicle at an engine speed of 1000 revolutions per minute in each gearbox ratio (see dropdown table to the right for more details).

==== 1998 formula ====
From 1998 until January 2020, the fiscal tax depended on a standardised value of carbon dioxide CO_{2} emissions in grams per kilometre (g/km) and the maximum engine power in kilowatts (kW). If C is the amount of CO_{2} released and P the engine power, then:

$$P_A = \frac{C}{45} + \left( \frac{P}{40} \right)^{1.6}$$

$P_A$ is expressed in horsepower, rounded to the nearest integer. The official emission rate of CO_{2} included in the calculation is taken from the European certificate of conformity.

=== Germany ===
Tax horse-power (Steuer-PS) was introduced in Germany on 3 June 1906 however in contrast to many regions, i.e. British and French tax horsepower formulae above, it was calculated based on the overall engine displacement from its implementation.

The German formula applied a higher tax horse-power factor to two stroke engine cars than to four-stroke engined cars based on the fact each cylinder in a two-stroke engine fires (has a power stroke) every revolution whereas an Otto cycle or four-stroke cylinder only fires every second revolution .

The formulae for calculating units of tax horsepower (Steuer-PS) were as follows:

four-stroke engined cars = $0.30\times i\times d ^2\times s$

two-stroke engined cars = $0.45\times i\times d ^2\times s$

where:

$i$ = the number of cylinders
$d$ = the diameter (or bore) of each cylinder
$s$ = the stroke length of each cylinder

Incomplete fractions were rounded up to the nearest whole number so a four-stroke engined car of 1,000 cc (61 cu in) would end up designated as a 4 PS (or four horsepower) car for car tax purposes.

After April 1928, recognizing the logic of the linear relationship between tax horsepower and engine capacity, the authorities simply set car tax rates according to engine size for passenger cars. (For commercial vehicles vehicle tax became a function of vehicle weight.) Attempts to correlate new tax horsepower values with old ones result in small differences due to roundings used in the new formula which are, for most purposes, unimportant.

In 1933 the Hitler government came into power and identified the promotion of the auto industry as key to economic recovery: new cars purchased after April 1933 were no longer burdened by an annual car tax charge and German passenger car production surged from 41,727 in 1932 to 276,804 in 1938. Thereafter war and military defeat led to a change in car tax policy and after 1945 tax horse-power returned in West Germany, applying the 1928 formula, as a determinant of annual car tax on new cars purchased in or after 1945. However, the introduction of tax on road fuel in 1951 and progressive increases in fuel tax thereafter reduced the importance of annual car tax so that today far more of the tax on car ownership is collected via fuel taxes than via annual car tax.

=== Italy ===
Fiscal horsepower is still used in Italy for insurance purposes; it was formerly used also for car property taxation and it is based on engine displacement. Following the 1973 oil crisis up until the 1990s, it was heavily imposed on vehicles with engines larger than 2,000 cc, prompting Italian car makers to fit turbochargers for extra power without enlarging the displacement.

=== Spain ===
Fiscal horsepower also lives on in Spain, but is defined simply in terms of overall engine capacity. It therefore encourages small engines, but does not influence the ratio of cylinder bore to stroke. The current Spanish definition does, however, add a factor that varies in order to favour four-stroke engines over two-stroke engines.

$$P_f = T \left({0.785 \cdot D^{2} \cdot R}\right)^{0.6} \cdot n$$

where:

$P_f$ = Tax Horsepower (Potencia fiscal),
$T$ = 0.08 for four-stroke engines, 0.11 for two-stroke engines,
$D$ = cylinder bore in centimetres,
$R$ = stroke length in centimetres,
$n$ = Number of cylinders

For vehicles where the above formula cannot be applied (e.g. electric vehicles), the tax horsepower is derived from the effective engine power (which is defined by law as the maximum power that the engine can provide after being used at full power from 30 minutes, which is normally lower than the rated engine power). Until 1998 the nominal power of the engine was used instead of the effective power.

$$P_f = \frac P {5.152}$$

where:

$P_f$ = Tax Horsepower (Potencia fiscal),
$P$ = effective power in kW

=== Switzerland ===
The 26 cantons of Switzerland used (and use) a variety of different taxation methods. Originally, all of Switzerland used the tax horsepower, calculated as follows:

$$\text{CV/PS}=0.4\times i\times d^2\times S$$

where:

$i$ = the number of cylinders,
$d$ = the diameter (or bore) of the cylinder in cm,
$S$ = the piston stroke in cm

or 1.6/π = 0.51 times engine displacement in cc

The limits between the horsepower denominations were drawn at either 0.49, 0.50, or 0.51 in different cantons. Thus, the eight horsepower category would cover cars of about 7.5–8.5 CV. In 1973 Berne switched to a taxation system based on vehicle weight, and a few other cantons followed. In 1986 Ticino switched to a system based on a calculation including engine size and weight. The tax horsepower system remained in effect for seven cantons long into the 21st century; however, as of 2022, although quite likely earlier, Geneva was the only canton to still base road tax purely on tax horsepower. The plethora of different taxation systems has contributed to there always being an uncommonly wide variety of different cars marketed in Switzerland.

== Japan ==
In pre-war Japan, different prefectures had different automobile tax structures. Tokyo Prefecture was naturally the strictest, due to the population and vehicle density there, and used a tax horsepower system of their own devising:

$$\text{tax HP}=\frac{D\times S\times n}{3}$$

where

$D$ = the diameter (or bore) of the cylinder in inches,
$S$ = the piston stroke in inches,
$n$ = the number of cylinders

Unlike the British system, the Tokyo system favored short-stroked engines, but since the tax categories were rather wide and only represented a portion of vehicle taxes it had less impact on sales. In 1950 new legislation was passed that taxed engine displacement in 500 cc increments. The automobile tax is paid every year during the road tax obligation.

== Impact on engine design and on auto-industry development ==
The fiscal benefits of reduced cylinder diameters (bore) in favor of longer cylinders (stroke) in Britain and Ireland may have been a factor in encouraging the proliferation of relatively small six-cylinder-engined models appearing in Europe in the 1930s, as the market began to open up for faster middle-weight models. The system clearly perpetuated side-valve engines in countries where the taxation system encouraged these engine designs, and delayed the adoption of overhead valve engines because the small cylinder diameter reduced the space available for overhead valves and the lengthy combustion chamber in any case reduced their potential for improving combustion efficiency.

Another effect was to make it very expensive to run cars imported from countries where there was no fiscal incentive to minimise cylinder diameters: this may have limited car imports from the US to Europe during a period when western governments were employing naked protectionist policies in response to economic depression, and thereby encouraged US auto-makers wishing to exploit the European auto-markets to set up their own dedicated subsidiary plants in the larger European markets.

Taxation can modify incentives and tax horsepower is no exception. Large capacity (displacement) engines are penalized, so engineers working where engine capacity is taxed are encouraged to minimize capacity. This rarely happened in the US, where license plate fees, even adjusted for horsepower ratings, were comparatively much lower than European car taxes.
