= Lagonda 14/60 =

Lagonda 14/60 or 2 Litre
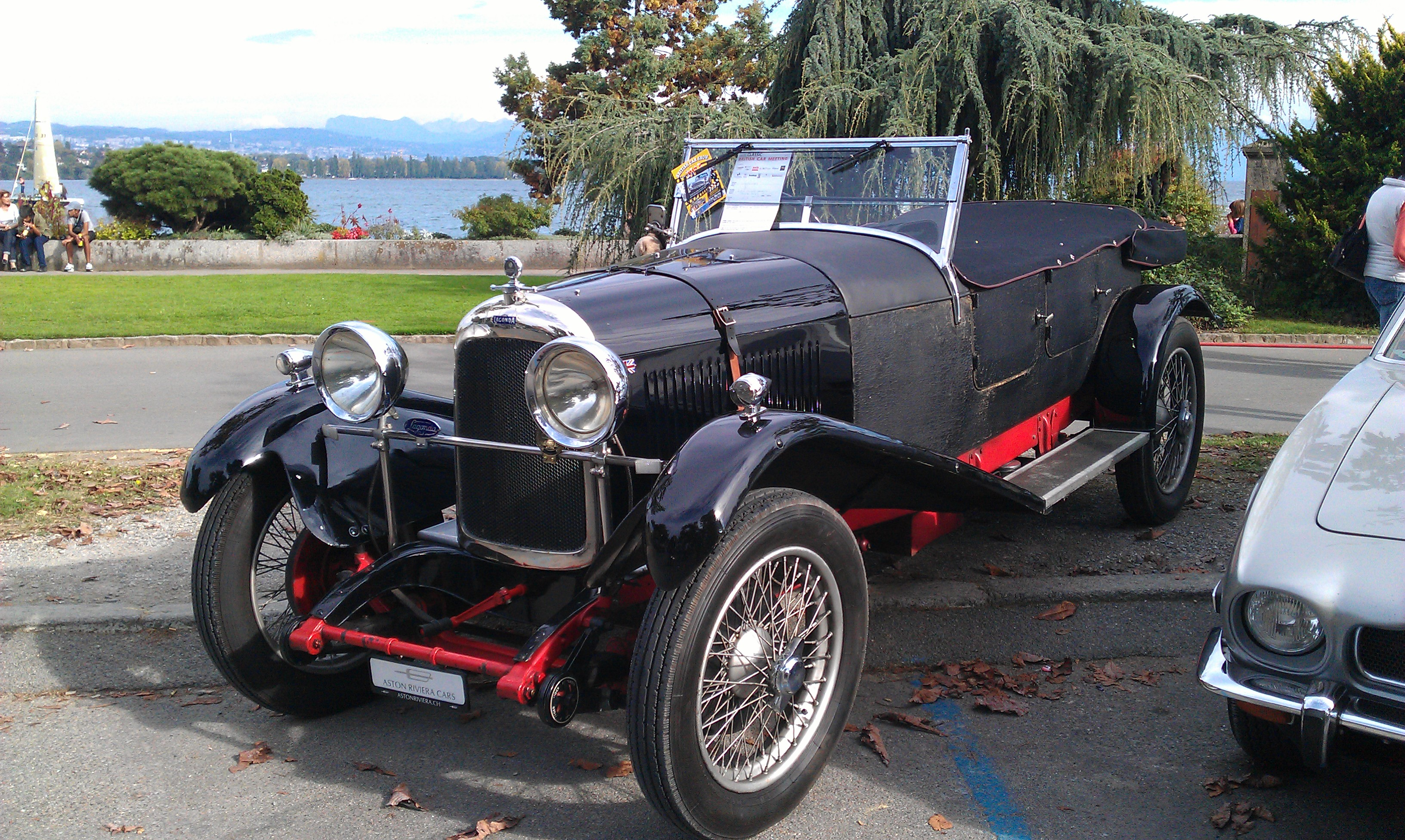

Overview
- Manufacturer: Lagonda
- Production: 1925–1933

Body and chassis
- Body style: 2 door sports, 4-door tourer, 4 door saloon

Powertrain
- Engine: 1,954 cc ohv 4 cylinder

Dimensions
- Wheelbase: 120 in (3,048 mm)
- Length: 162 in (4,115 mm)
- Width: 68 in (1,727 mm)

Chronology
- Predecessor: Lagonda 12/24
- Successor: Lagonda 16/80

The Lagonda 14/60 is a sports touring car that was introduced by Lagonda in 1925. Production of the 14/60 continued until 1931. As well as the standard car there were variants called the 2 Litre Speed (1927–33) and the Continental (1932 only).

The first part of its name referred to its Fiscal horsepower rating of 14 (actually 12.9) and the second part the engine output in bhp.

According to the Lagonda Club, about 1,440 cars were made.

== Engine and transmission ==
The engine was a new design for the car by Arthur Davidson who had been with Lea-Francis. The four-cylinder, 1,954 cc unit was notable for its valve gear. Two camshafts were mounted high on each side of the engine block and operated the overhead valves via rockers mounted in the head that had fingers that followed the camshafts. This allowed the cylinder head, which unlike previous Lagondas was detachable, with its hemi-spherical combustion chambers to be removed without disturbing the valve timing. This was important at the time as decarbonizing and valve grinding were regularly required, before the introduction of lead in the petrol to lubricate the valve seats. Unfortunately the resulting geometry included very restrictive inlet airways to the valves, limiting performance. The camshafts were driven by a two-stage chain arrangement; the first chain also drove the dynamo, oil and water pumps. The crankshaft was carried in five main bearings. A single Zenith carburettor was fitted. With a bore of 72mm and stroke of 120mm the engine was said to produce 60bhp at 3,500rpm.

The four-speed gearbox was separate from the engine and driven through a single dry-plate clutch. An open shaft then went to the spiral-bevel rear axle.

== Chassis and suspension ==
The chassis design was by AE Masters and consisted of side members held apart by a combination of tubular and channel cross members. Semi-elliptical leaf springs were fitted front and rear. 14 in (356 mm) drum brakes operated by rods and cables were fitted on all four wheels with separate shoes in the rear brakes for the handbrake.

== Coachwork ==
Three standard body styles were available for the 14/60, a saloon, a tourer and an open semi-sports with V-shaped windscreen. The saloon and tourer were designed to accommodate five people but the slightly narrower sports only four. Early cars were fitted with steel artillery type wheels but later cars had wire wheels. Some chassis went to external coachbuilders.

== 2 Litre Speed Model ==
In 1927 Lagonda announced the Speed model. The engine was tuned to give 70 bhp by raising the compression ratio. The body was lighter, and Lagonda guaranteed the car to reach 80 mph (130 km/h). The chassis was modified to allow the engine to be mounted 9 in (229 mm) further back, giving a much longer bonnet. Standard bodies were a tourer or fabric saloon.

For 1929 the chassis was further modified and has become known as the "low-chassis" version. The radiator was also altered as the dynamo was moved to the front of the crankshaft.

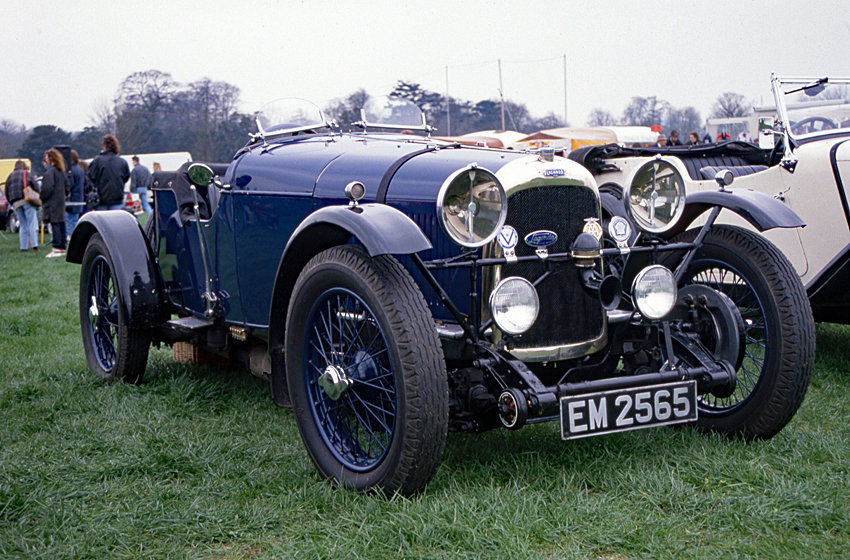
1931 Lagonda 2 Litre Speed low chassis at Ston Easton

In 1930 Lagonda announced a supercharged version, said to be capable of 90 mph (140 km/h). A Cozette supercharger was fitted to most examples, but other types were also tried. The supercharger was intended to improve engine torque and reduce the need for gearchanging, which many drivers disliked in the era before synchromesh. These vane-type superchargers were theoretically the most efficient type available, but their lack of durability became notorious, and they failed to deliver torque where it was most needed to avoid gear-changing, at low engine speeds. Owners liked the performance, but only a few escaped failures, which were expensive.

With hindsight, a more durable Roots type (as used by Bentley, for example) might have been better. However, it would have required significant redesign, as there was not enough space in the Speed Model to fit it. Another better solution might have been a redesigned cylinder head with downdraught inlet passages, delivering more performance without a supercharger. Both these alternatives would have required significant investment, but Lagonda was short of money. A supercharger, on the other hand, was a performance option, required less redesign and could justify an addition to the price, unlike a new cylinder head which was less visible to the customer.

Lagonda's performance dilemma arose from making the cylinder head easy to remove, which was part of its effort to make the car easier to service. This aim inspired other design features of the car, such as an oil drain that could be operated from a standing position, and grease nipples with pipes arranged so that all greasing could be done from one place. Lagonda seemed to fear that the 1930's gentleman driver might have to service the car without the aid of a chauffeur, so they prioritised simplifying servicing at the expense of performance.

This appears with hindsight to have been a misjudgment. Most cars developed through the 1930s without such features, and owners either did the work themselves or took the car to a repair and service garage instead. In the course of the 1930s the supercharger fell out of fashion with most manufacturers, perhaps due to the invention of synchromesh, which alleviated the noisy and embarrassing problem of the inexpert driver changing gear with a "crash box".

== Continental ==
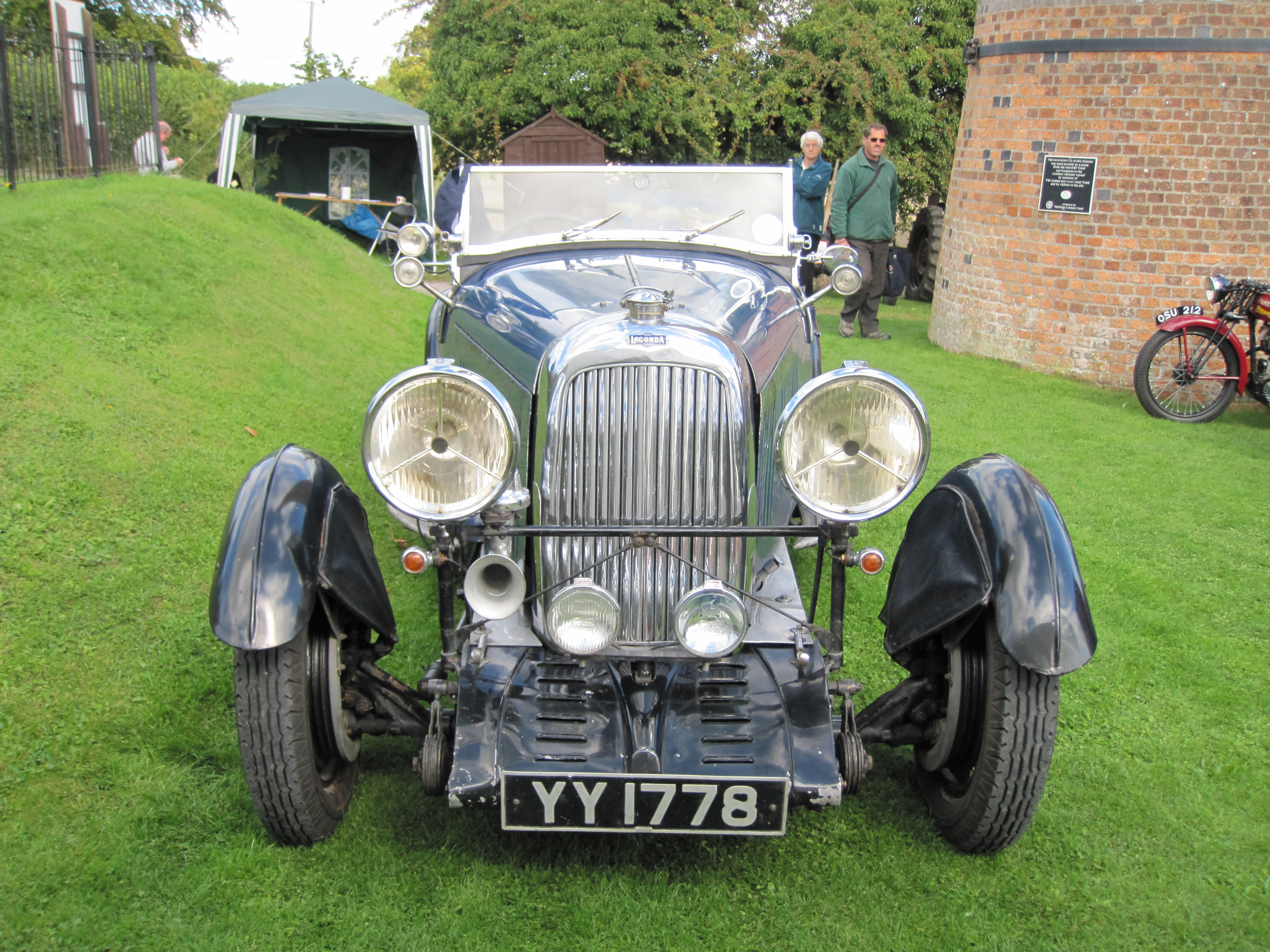
Continental model with the large Lucas headlamps

In 1932 Lagonda announced a new model called the Continental. Its tourer body is made of steel. Its radiator is inclined slightly, and has thermostatic shutters. Cycle type front wings are fitted and it has large Lucas P100 headlamps. The car cost an extra £30, and 23 were made.
