= Dennis Specialist Vehicles =

Automotive manufacturer in Surrey, England

Dennis Brothers Limited; Dennis Motors Limited; Hestair Dennis; Dennis Specialist Vehicles
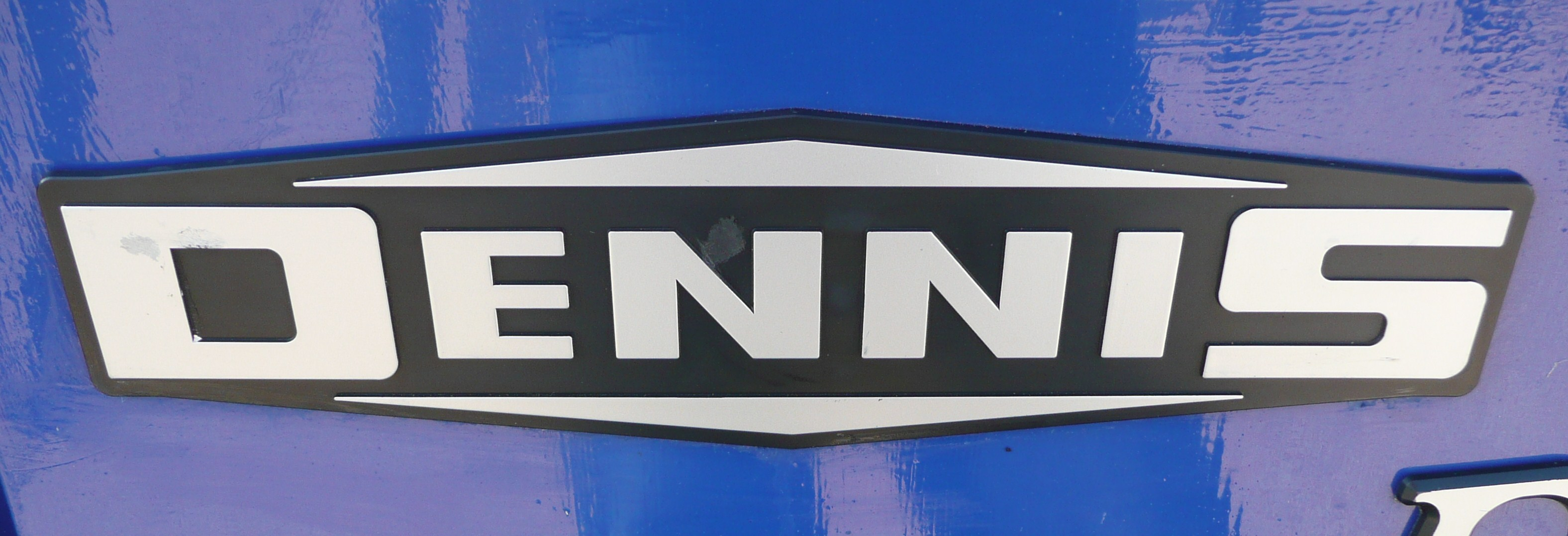
- The later style of Dennis badge, still used on Dennis mowers
- Type: Public listed company
- Industry: Automotive
- Predecessor: Dennis Brothers
- Founded: 1895; 131 years ago
- Founder: John and Raymond Dennis
- Defunct: 2007; 19 years ago (As TransBus International)
- Fate: Municipal vehicles sold 1999; Public service vehicles sold under receivership in 2004
- Successor: Alexander Dennis; Dennis Eagle
- Headquarters: Guildford, England
- Number of locations: (Plants) Guildford, Warwick, Scarborough, Anston, Blackpool, Wigan, Falkirk, Belfast
- Area served: Worldwide
- Key people: John and Raymond Dennis; David Hargreaves; Geoff Hollyhead
- Products: Cars, Lorries, Buses; Firefighting apparatus, Vans, Ambulances, Waste management vehicles; Motor mowers; Airport tugs
- Parent: Independent (1895-1972); Hestair Group (1972-1989); Trinity Holdings MBO; Dennis Group (1989-1998); Mayflower Corporation (1998-2001); Transbus International (2001-2004); Alexander Dennis (2004-present)
- Website: Dennis Group website

Dennis Specialist Vehicles was an English manufacturer of commercial vehicles based in Guildford, building buses, fire engines, lorries (trucks) and municipal vehicles such as dustcarts. All vehicles were made to order to the customer's requirements and more strongly built than mass production equivalents. For most of the 20th century the Dennis company was Guildford's main employer.

Following a decade of financial difficulties original shareholders sold out in 1972 and Dennis's ownership has since passed through quite a number of hands. No Dennis haulage trucks have been built since 1985. The last Dennis fire engine left the Guildford factory in 2007. The Woodbridge site was sold, and a new factory, built in Slyfield in 1991, remained in use by a lineal business descendant, bus-maker Alexander Dennis, until 2020, when it too was closed down.

The Dennis brand is still used on Alexander Dennis buses, Dennis Eagle dustcarts and Dennis mowers.

== Dennis Brothers 1895 to 1901 ==
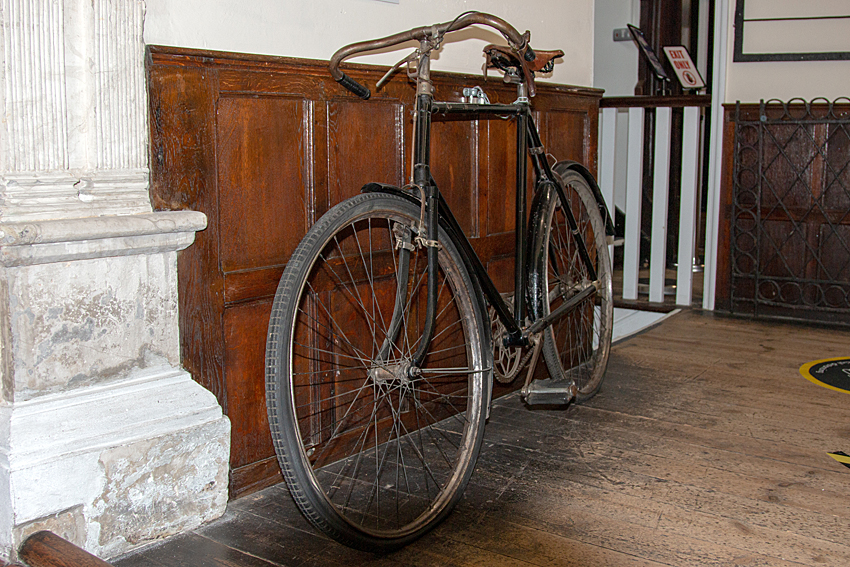
Dennis Brothers Speed King bicycle in Guildford Museum

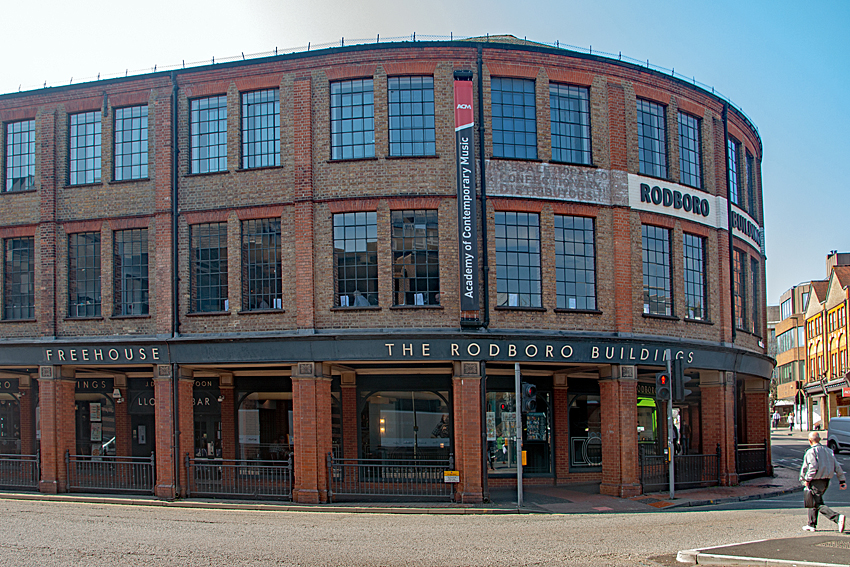
The first purpose-built motor vehicle factory in Britain in Onslow Street, Guildford

Dennis Brothers was founded in 1895 by brothers John Cawsey Dennis (1871–1939) and (Herbert) Raymond Dennis (1878–1939) who made Speed King bicycles. They built the bicycles, initially from bought-in parts, and sold them from their shop, The Universal Athletic Stores, in High Street, Guildford. They made their first motor vehicle in 1898, and in 1899, their first car, The Dennis Light Doctor's Car. Though shown at the National Cycle Show this car was never put into production.

== Dennis Brothers Limited 1901 to 1972 ==
=== Cars ===
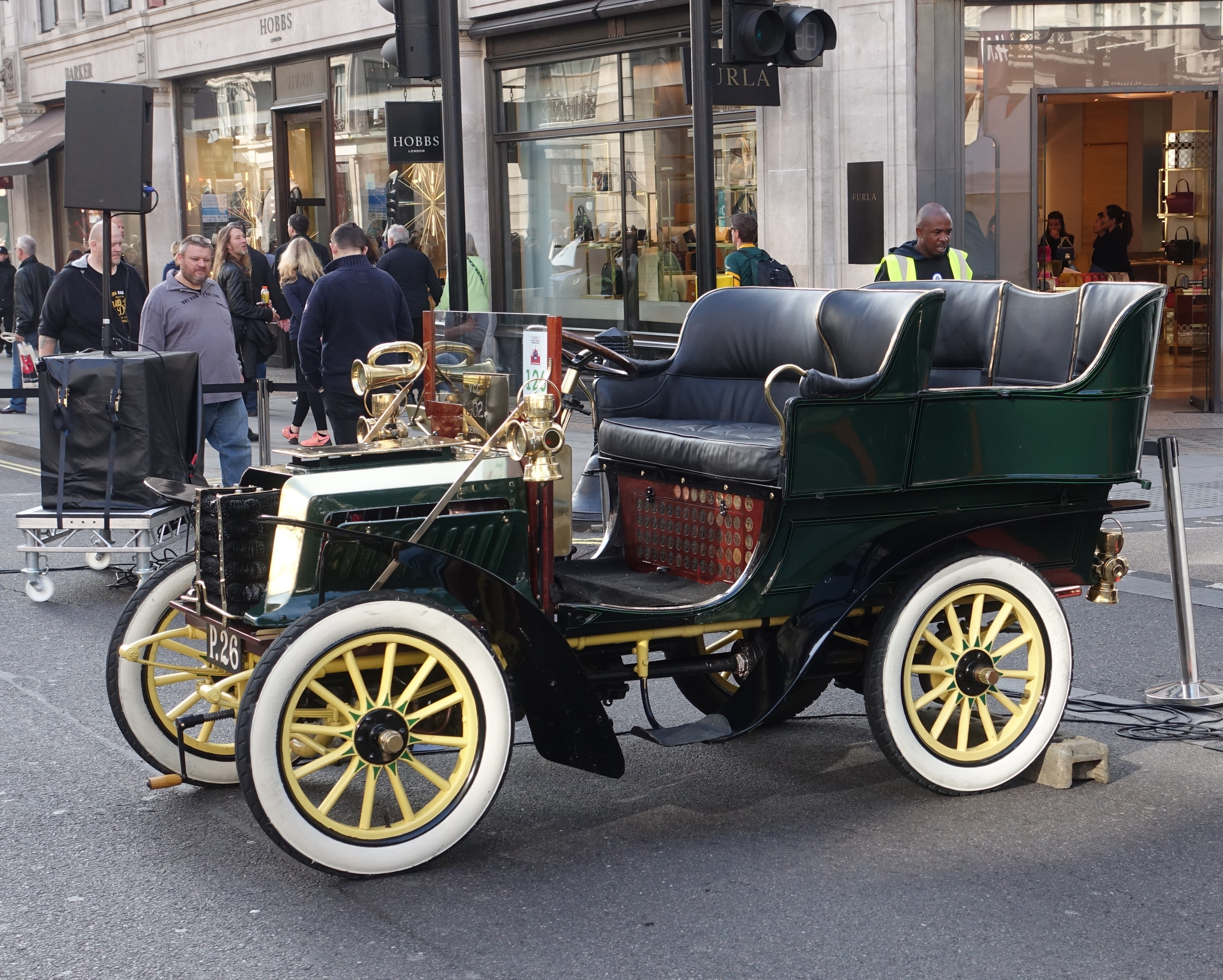
Dennis rear entrance tonneau. This 1902 car belongs to John C. R. Dennis, grandson of founder John C. Dennis

After incorporating Dennis Brothers Limited, in which they were given generous financial support by local cyclists and potential motorists, the brothers began car production around 1901. John Dennis built a 30,000 square foot three storey plus basement building in Onslow Street in the centre of Guildford with a lift between floors later known as the Rodboro Buildings. This was the first purpose-built motor vehicle factory in Britain.

Their range of cars was quickly extended to 12 hp, 14 hp, 16 and 20 hp chassis fitted with tourer, town car and limousine bodies. From the Dennis Brothers stand at the 1903 Crystal Palace Motor Show the brothers sold almost £30,000 worth of cars and took many more orders. Larger models followed their first light cars. A 35 hp model in 1906 was powered by a White and Poppe engine. This power unit was soon fitted to all their vehicles.

=== Worm drive back axle ===
Until well into the early years of the twentieth century the back wheels of most vehicles were driven by a chain from each side of a differential fixed to the chassis frame. Dennis Brothers developed and patented a reliable worm drive into a differential mounted on the back axle. Another feature of that period was spring drive, a torsional shock absorber mounted at the input end of the drive line.

=== Commercial vehicles ===
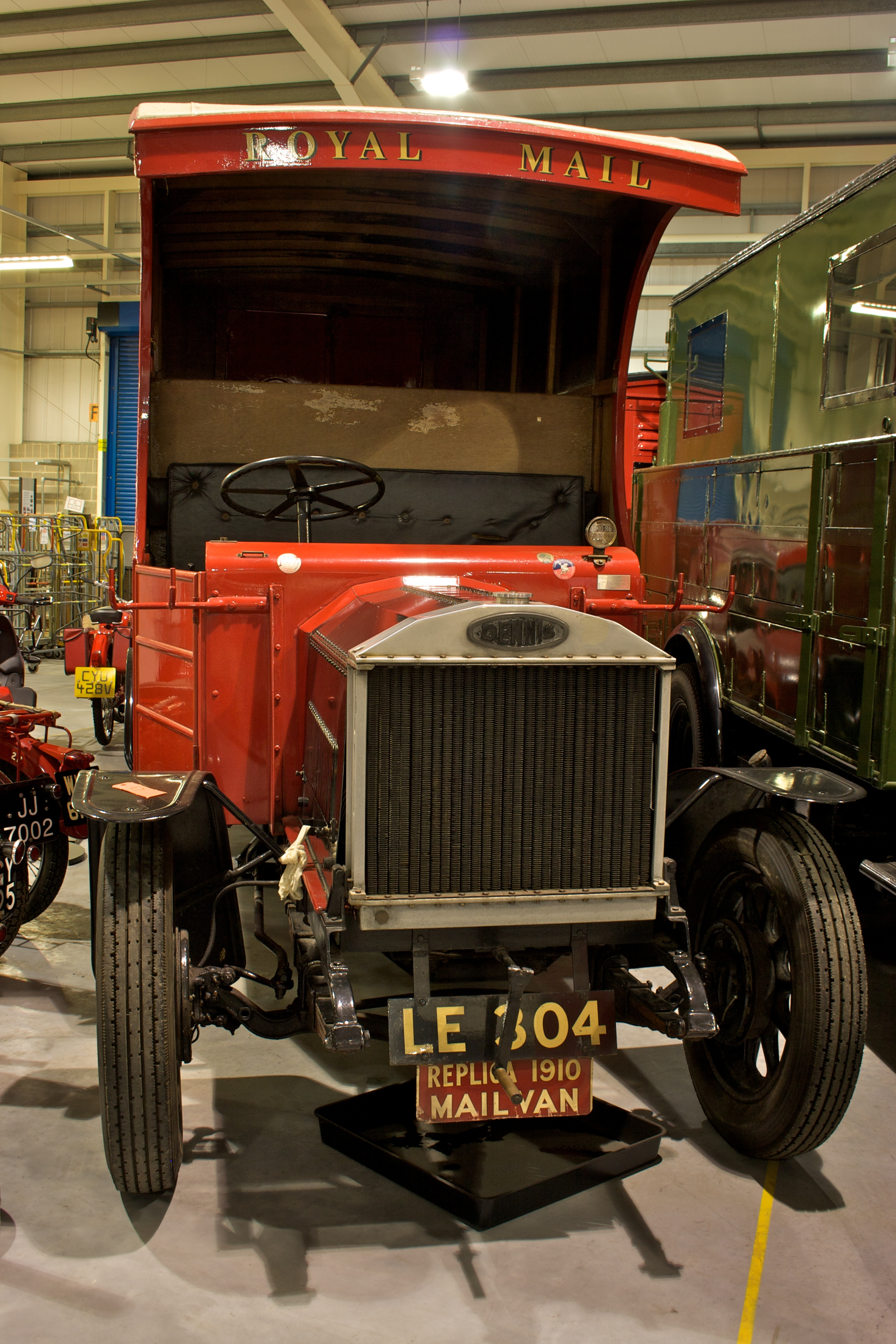
1910 van replica

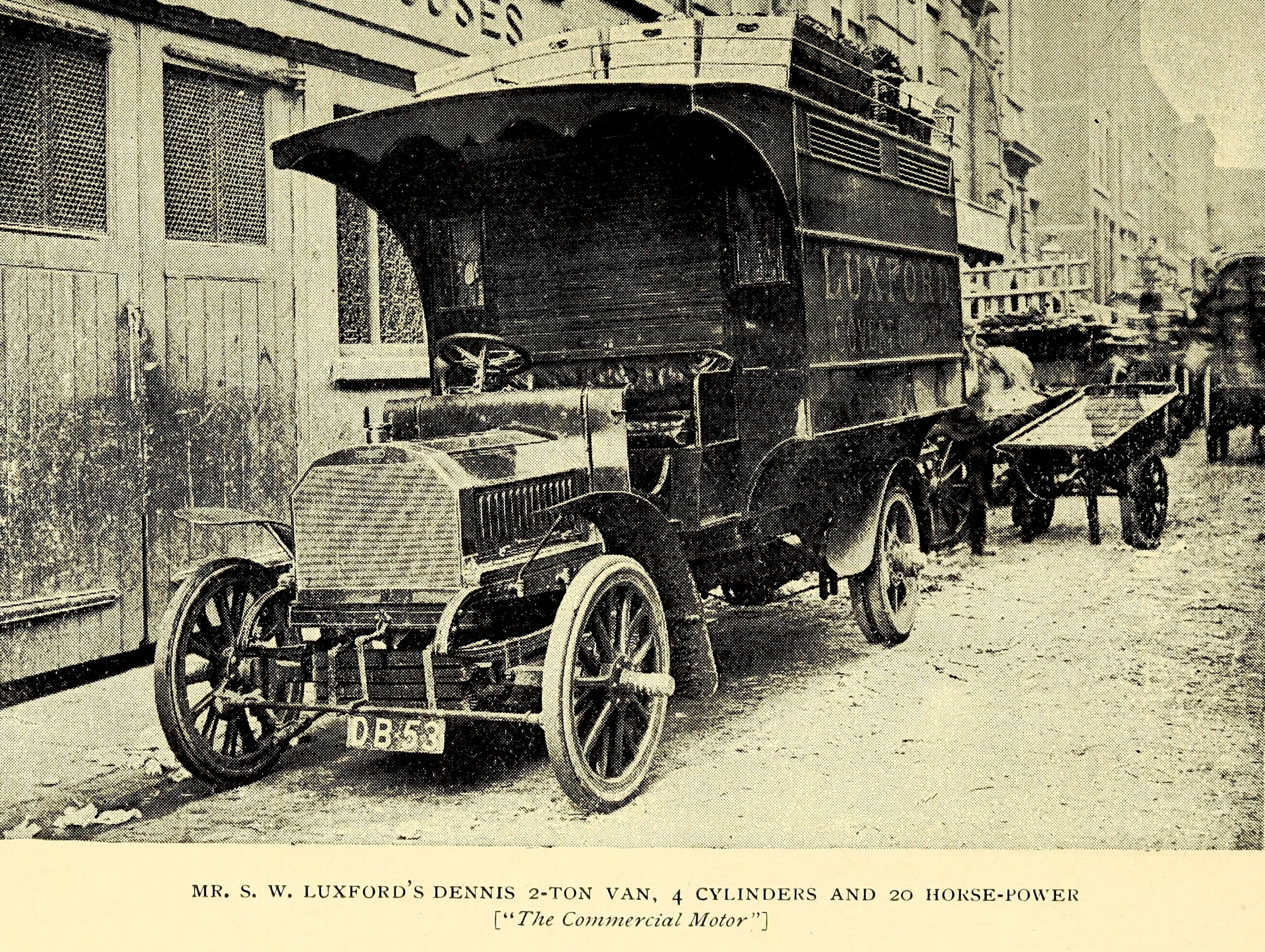
1906 2-ton van

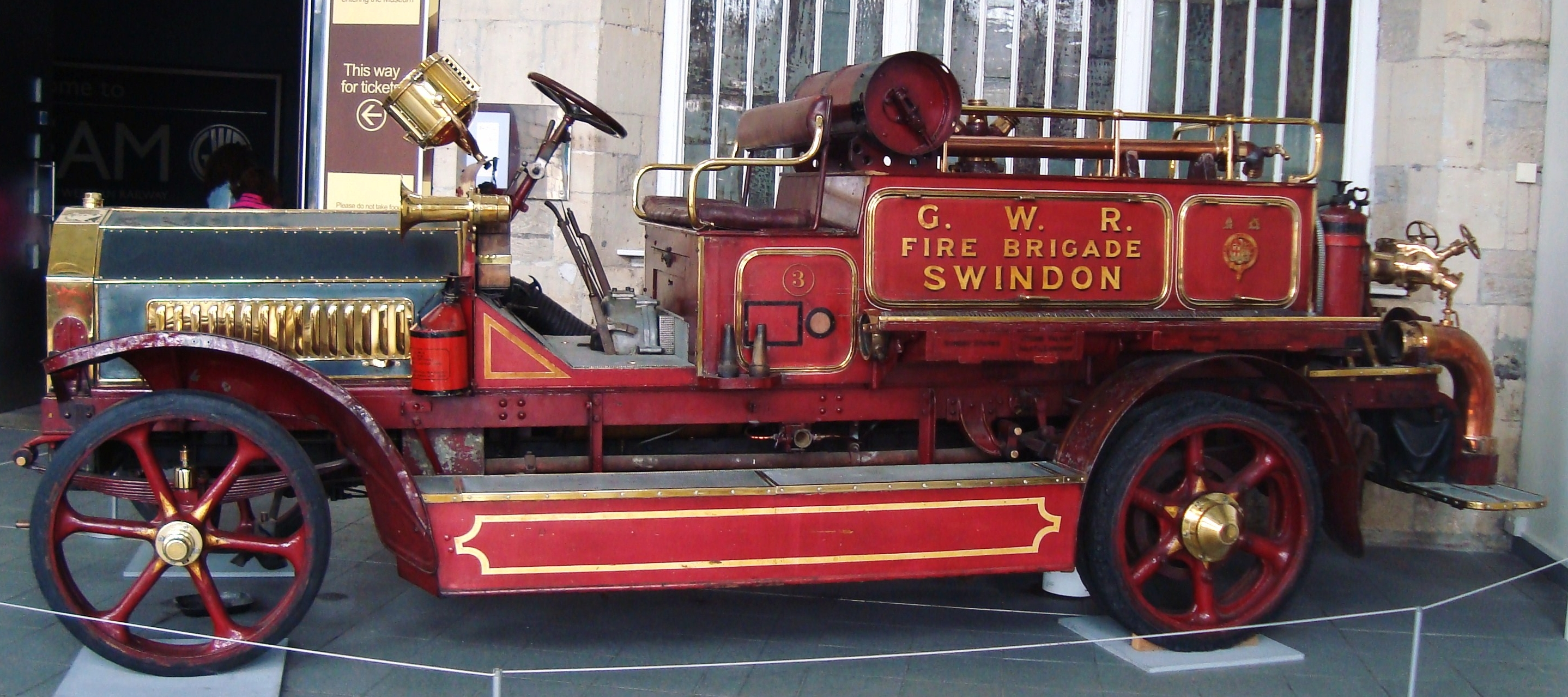
1912 motor-fire-engine for Swindon Works

Commercial vehicle activity increased. Their first was a van for Harrods in London. Dennis made its first bus in 1903 and their first fire engine in 1908 — for Bradford Council Fire Department. The last car was made in 1913 after the Dennis brothers saw there was less competition in the commercial vehicle market.

The rate of growth of the business may be gauged from the regular expansions on their new site at Woodbridge Hill on the outskirts of Guildford — in 1907, 1910, 1912 and 1913. In 1913 Dennis Brothers moved their main operations to a new much larger building of almost four acres on the twelve-acre site at Woodbridge leaving their purpose-built Onslow Street premises solely for repairs. In March 1913 the investing public learnt that Dennis Brothers was a manufacturer of motor-vans, motor-lorries, motor-fire-engines, motor-cars etc. The brothers' offer of shares to the public was substantially over-subscribed and Dennis Brothers Limited became a publicly listed company. Rising international tensions precipitated a major contract for supply of 1,000 3-ton "subsidy" lorries to private buyers on terms set by the War Office. Taking the subsidy obliged the buyer to release the vehicle to the War Office in time of war. Materials had been ordered but no subvention lorries completed when the situation changed.

=== World War I ===
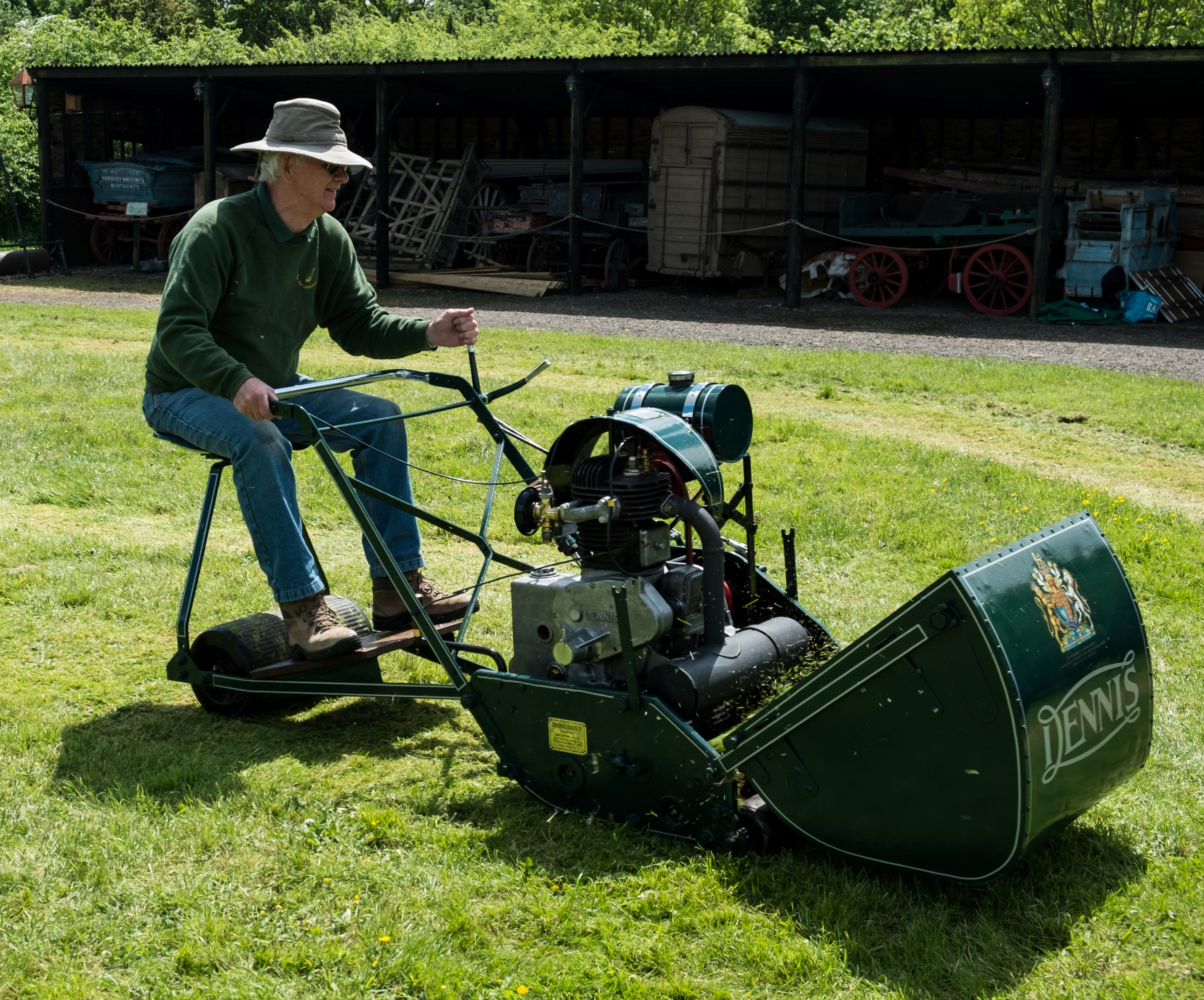
Motor mower

After August 1914's outbreak of hostilities production was reduced to the subvention type 3-ton military lorries, now supplied directly to the War Office, and the Dennis turbine fire engine. (Note: Pumper with a 50 gallon tank fitted with a new high efficiency Gwynne centrifugal pump. The Dennis Turbine Fire Engine.Commercial Motor 23 July 1908) The Ministry of Munitions took complete control of the whole business in 1915. New buildings were added to contain the manufacture of munitions.

=== 1920s ===
Following 1918's armistice there was a glut of war surplus vehicles and a consequent collapse in demand for new trucks. To try to compensate the Dennis product range was expanded into municipal vehicles — dustcarts (refuse collection), street cleaning vehicles, sewage tankers and pumps etc. Municipal vehicles do not suffer from the fluctuations of demand experienced by the overall economy. Buyers tend to replace them at fixed periods so there is an element of longer term planning. While it is a relatively small market it is stable. Motor mowers were added in 1922.

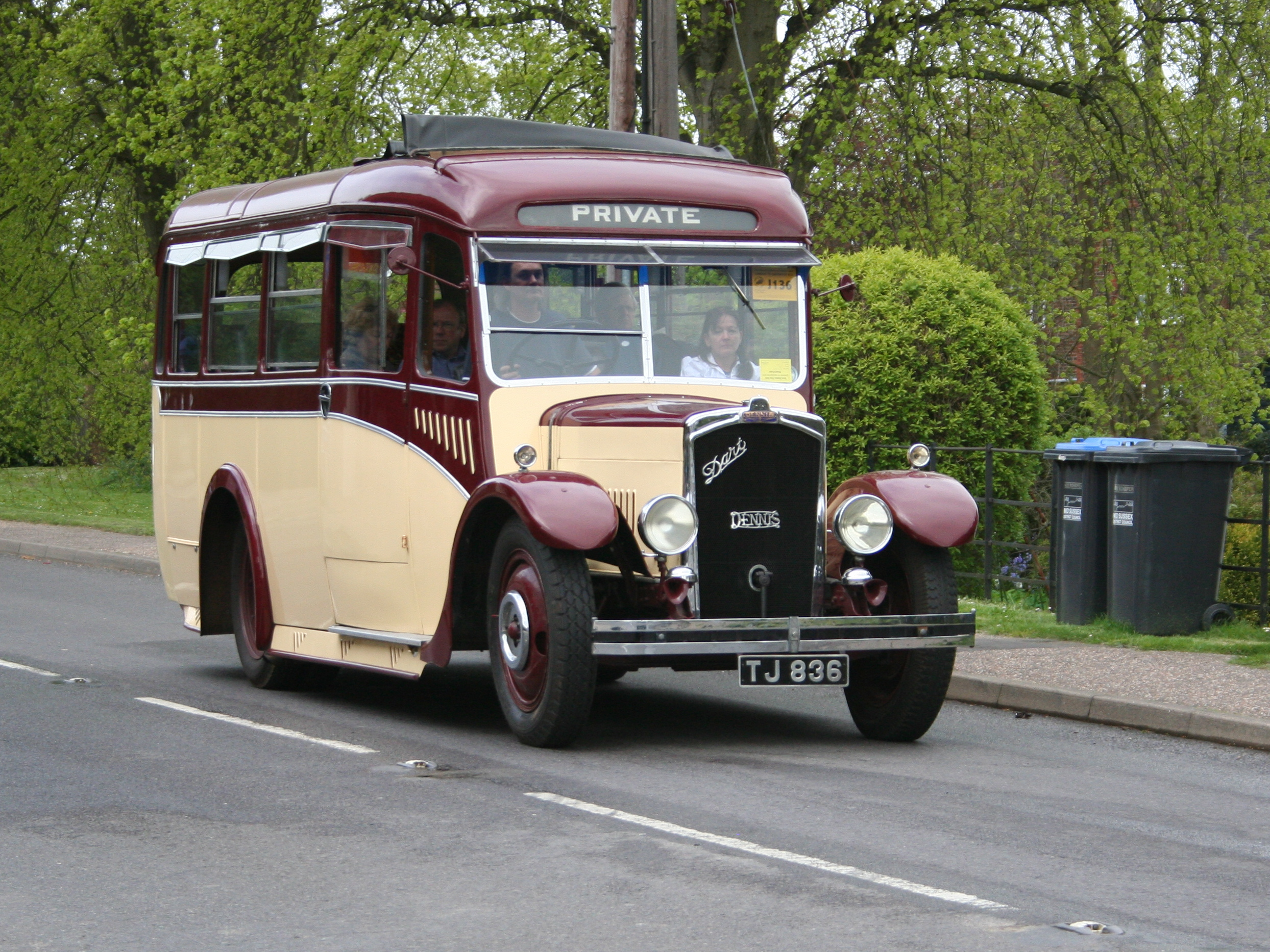
1933 Dart with Duple body

White and Poppe in Coventry had always supplied engines for Dennis Brothers motor vehicles. A takeover had been under consideration before the war but it was not until April 1919 that it was made public Dennis Brothers and White and Poppe had agreed to an exchange of shares in each other's business. The swap gave Dennis Brothers the controlling interest in White and Poppe. Alfred White and Peter Poppe joined the Dennis Brothers board but it was not until March 1933 in the midst of the 1930s depression that engine production was transferred from Coventry to Guildford.

One chassis was used for both lorries and buses. In the 1920s Dennis began to design and build separate chassis for their public service vehicles (buses) with a lower ride height. Pneumatic tyres were introduced. Forward control buses were added to their catalogue in the same decade. Export markets were developed between the wars, particularly vehicles for Hong Kong.

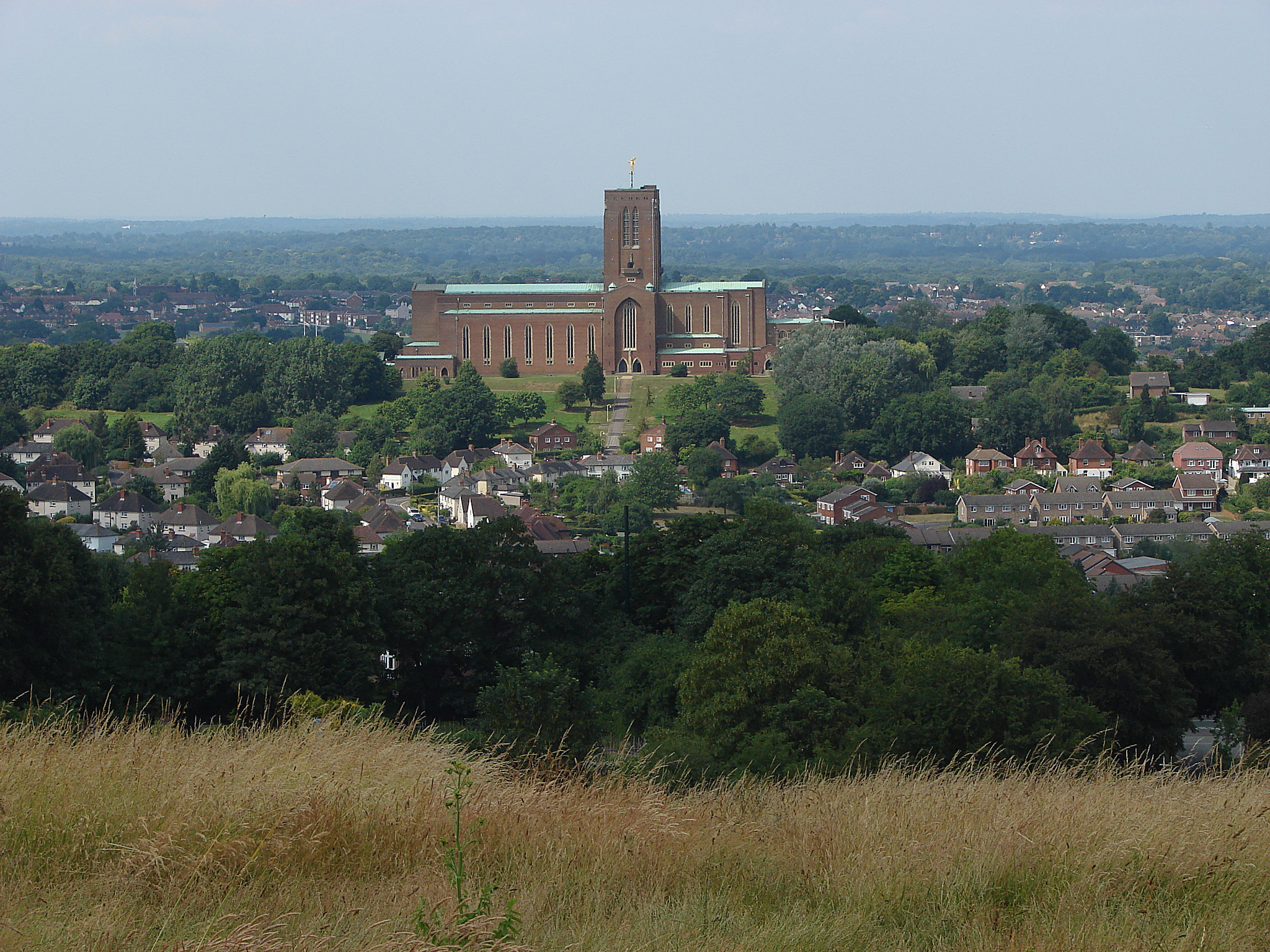
Dennisville on the left below Guildford Cathedral

=== The 1930s ===
The decade began with the Great Depression. Diesel engines were in demand for larger commercial vehicles. New Dennis buses were a double-deck Lance and single-deck Lancet. The Dennis Ace, a smaller twenty-seater bus was brought into production in 1933 using the chassis of Dennis's small lorry. The Arrow Minor followed in 1935 and a new Falcon chassis in 1938.

John and Raymond Dennis built 223 houses for their workers, 102 of them on a 20 acres estate in Woodbridge Hill for their Coventry motor workers who brought production of White & Poppe engines to Guildford in 1933. The area took on the name Dennisville. Both brothers died in 1939 and they are commemorated in the names of Dennisville's St John's Road and Raymond Crescent.

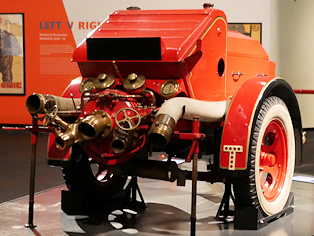
Wartime fire pump

=== Second World War ===
During the Second World War the Ministry of Supply restricted Dennis to lorries and allocated bus production to Daimler and Guy. Over that period Dennis built some 3,000 6/8 ton capacity Max and 1,500 Pax 3-ton lorries, assembled 700 Churchill tanks, 17,000 engines for landing craft, 7,000 fire pumps, 750,000 bombs and 3,000 infantry carriers. Meanwhile, 'municipal vehicles' were built for military bases. The plant operated around the clock and the number of workers doubled to 4,000.

=== 1948 Nationalisation of road haulage ===
British Road Services, Britain's state-owned road haulage operator, didn't buy any trucks from Dennis. New products were developed but were not attractive to BRS. The suppliers to BRS were prospering, Leyland, AEC and Foden's technical advances and greater truck experience let them build even better buses to compete with Dennis buses. Only Dennis's light Pax trucks sold well and they went to businesses still permitted to run their own short-distance transport. Yet the company's buses and fire engines remained in demand. The 1940s and 1950s still managed to be Dennis's best years.

=== The 1950s ===
The 1950s saw the introduction of diesel engines and automatic transmissions and bus engines were moved below floors to increase carrying capacity.

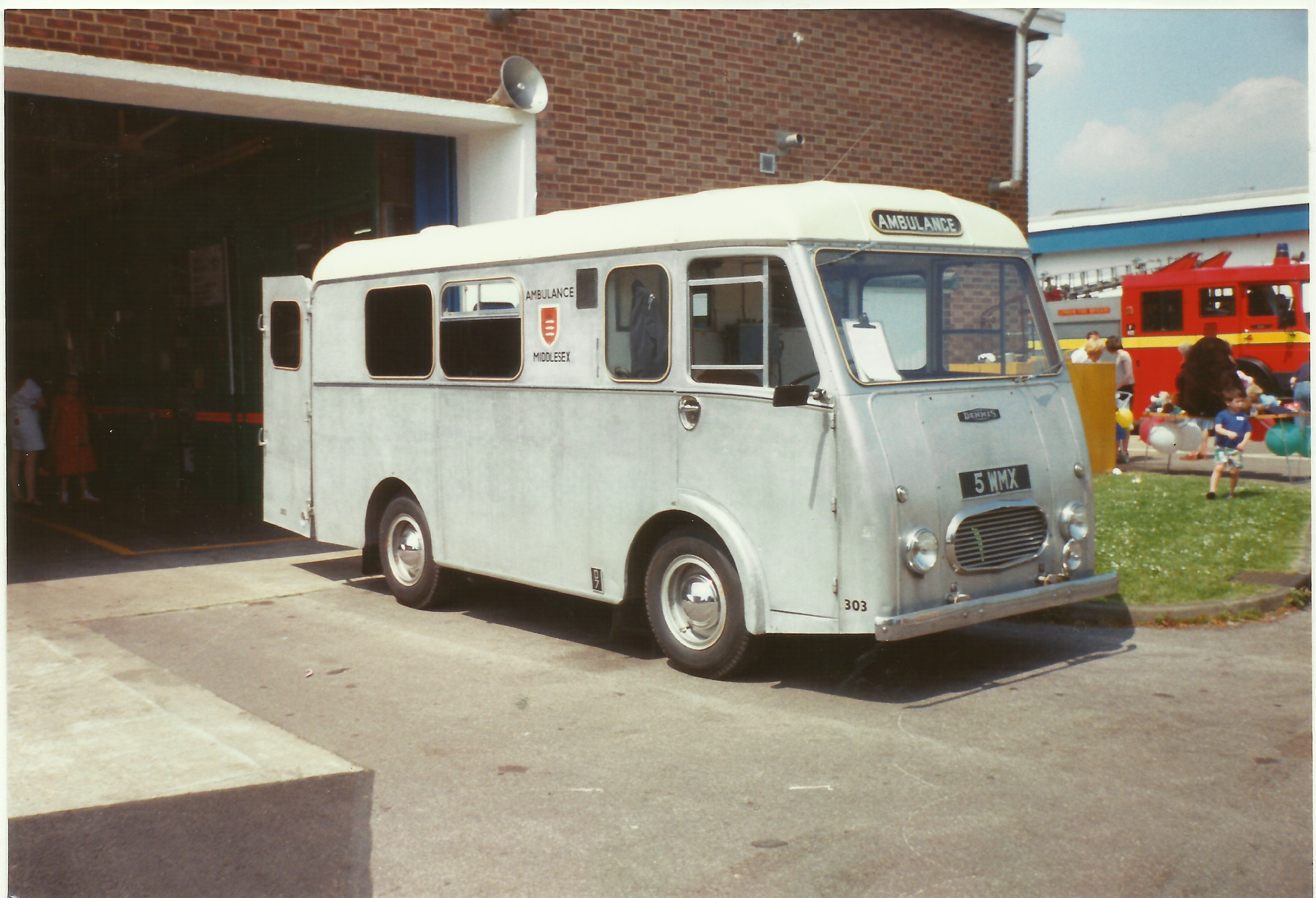
Middlesex ambulance

After the war bus production began again. 1950 introductions were a passenger chassis named Dominant with a semi-automatic transmission and a horizontally mounted diesel engine and Paxit all-enclosed mechanical rear-loading refuse-collection vehicles. Rolls-Royce diesel engines replaced Dennis petrol engines in the fire engines during 1951. New show vehicles in 1952 included a 5½ litre Centaur chassis with platform body, a Pax chassis with tipping gear and a lightweight body and the Stork chassis.

The AV1, a new diesel ambulance chassis, returned ambulances to the Dennis product line-up during 1954. The next year an updated heavy fire engine chassis received Rolls-Royce fully automatic gearboxes.

They were not yet in production but Dennis revealed their plans for new Loline model doubledeck buses at the end of 1956. Built with Dennis components they used a patented Bristol Lodekka chassis. The Dennis version was for the independent section of the market Bristol was unable to supply. During 1957 sales in both home and export markets fell. Demand for commercial vehicles did not recover after the Suez Crisis. The new Loline buses were in service and a variant new chassis was now available with front entry providing driver control of the door.

=== The 1960s ===
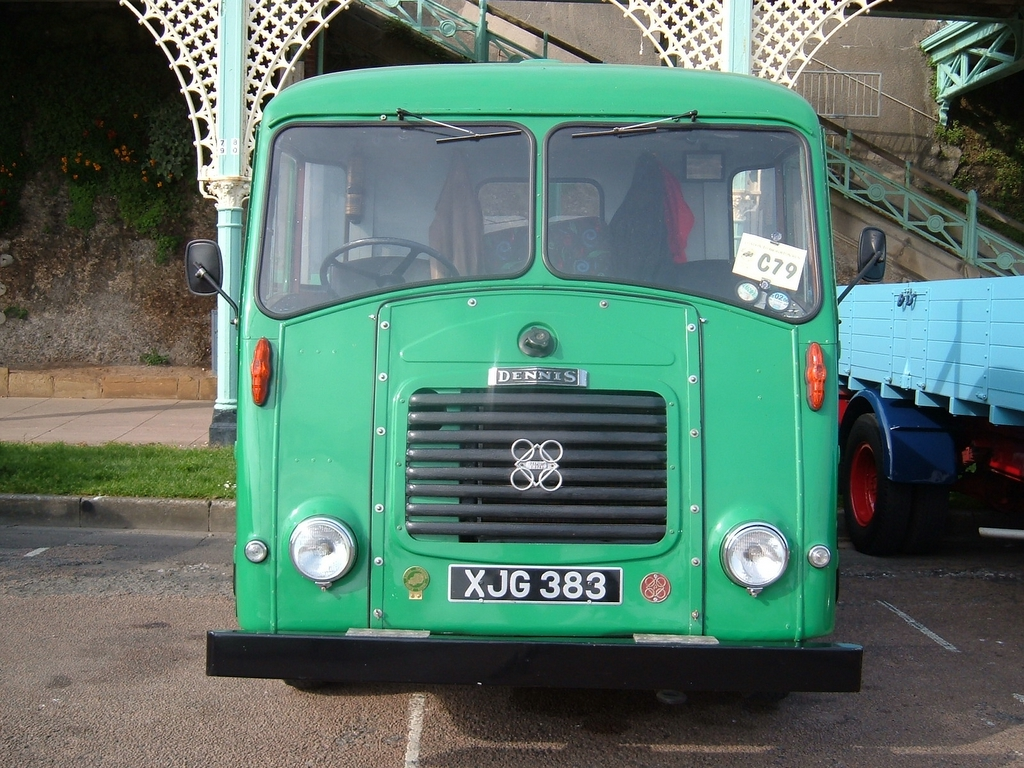
1961 Pax flatbed

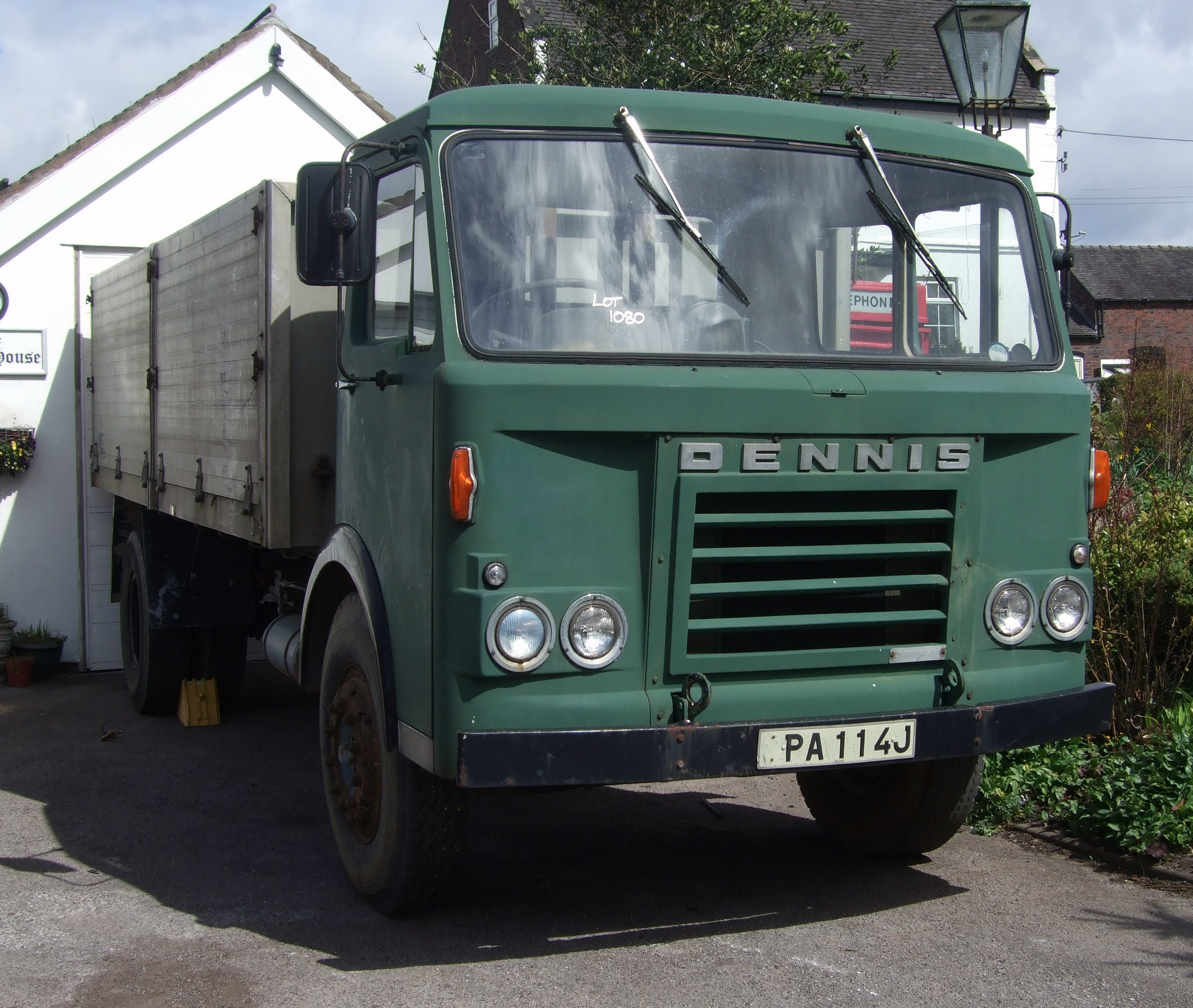
1971 Dominant tipper

In the 1960s engines moved to the back of the buses.

In May 1962, Dennis bought the fire appliance division of Hawker Siddeley Group's Alfred Miles. In April 1964 Dennis purchased the industrial tractor manufacturer Mercury Truck & Tractor Company, also Mercury Airfield Equipment that manufactured airport tugs and later baggage trailers and ground units, and Mercury Snow Control.

Potential passenger customers preferred their new vehicles front-entrance and rear-engined and Dennis had no bus in production to meet those requirements. Dennis chose to end bus manufacture in 1965 and concentrate on lorries which also faced declining demand.

In late 1965 a significant block of shareholders dissatisfied with the performance of their business asked that Dennis Brothers cease production and liquidate its assets. The disputes ended when the rebels were unable to find a buyer for the Dennis business at an acceptable price. Major changes were made to management and to the directorate. The following year turnover grew again and profits seemed to have made improvement. New capital was found for an expansion and modernisation programme and twelve months later the new chairman reported activities had been split into six clear-cut divisions and claimed they were "poised for recovery".

The shareholders were faced with continuing losses. Responding to their invitation John King of Pollard Ball took up the challenge and accepted the position of chairman of the board. Julian Amery, a former Minister of Aviation, joined the board as did a new CEO and a new finance director. The workforce of 1,300 was cut by 150, mostly white-collar workers. A banker was added to the directorate.

At King's suggestion Dennis Motor Holdings, was formed on 15 January 1970 as a holding company with all part-time directors. (Note: It is possible that directors of Dennis Brothers (with major shareholdings) holding key full-time management positions were unable to agree on the best plan for Dennis's future) In June the chairman announced much greater losses in the subsequent half year but he remained optimistic. They listed their products as: commercial vehicles, fire engines, refuse collection vehicles and aircraft tractors.

In 1971/72, Dennis sold 101 houses in Slyfield's Woking Road and in Midleton Road, Dennisville.

== Hestair Group ==
The Vehicle Division of Hestair Engineering

=== Dennis Motors 1972 to 1977 ===
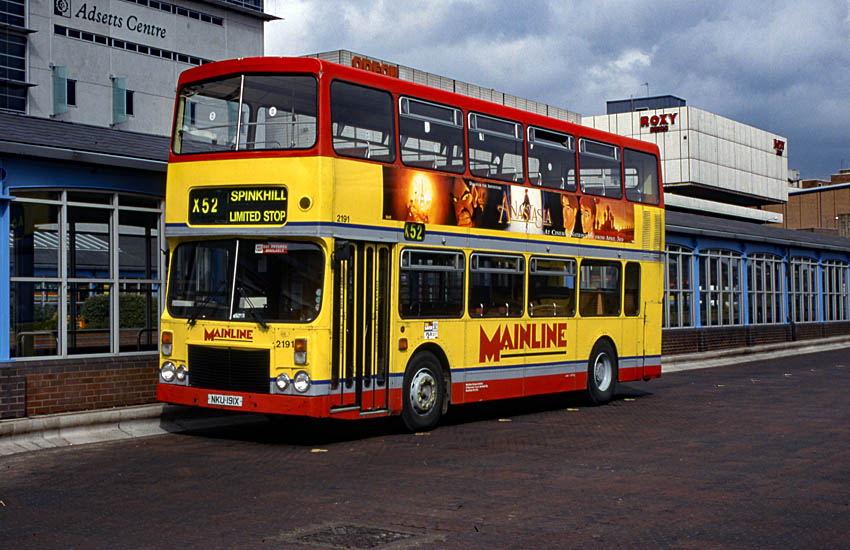
Dennis Dominator with Alexander body

In March 1972 Hestair made a successful takeover bid for Dennis Motor Holdings. It took effect in May 1972. With Dennis came 35 acres of sprawling red brick factory on the Guildford by-pass. Hestair announced it intended to sell surplus land.

Hestair was a new industrial investment vehicle managed by David Hargreaves. It had purchased street sweeper bodybuilder Yorkshire Vehicles and dustcart bodybuilder Eagle Engineering in 1971. Hestair's other interests were agricultural engineering, toys and employment bureaux.

Dennis Motor Holdings was renamed Dennis Motors Limited and with Eagle and Yorkshire Vehicles, managed as the Vehicle Division of Hestair Engineering.

In June 1972 the manufacture of trucks for haulage ceased. In September Hestair sold Dennis' Mercury towing tractors and motor mowers to Marshalls (Halifax) and new plant was bought for the Guildford factory.

Envec, an acronym for Environmental Vehicles, was chosen as the new brand name for marketing the municipal vehicles built by Dennis Motors, Eagle Engineering and Yorkshire Vehicles.

Non-specialist truck production for general haulage resumed in 1974 after a break of two years. New rear-engined single-decker and double-decker buses were announced in August 1977 after a bus-building break of eleven years. At the time of the announcement the workforce was 875 and Dennis Motors remained Guildford's largest employer. The first new bus was the Dominator with a double-deck body followed by more new buses named Jubilant, Dorchester, Lancet and Falcon. The Falcon chassis took either single or double-deck bodies. All these names belonged to previous successful Dennis models. A new range of fire appliances, the R series, went into production in 1976. A single specialist fire engine chassis on which modular body units could be mounted it was complementary to the existing range.

On 31 December 1977 Dennis Motors Limited was renamed Hestair Dennis Limited.

=== Hestair Dennis 1977 to 1985 ===
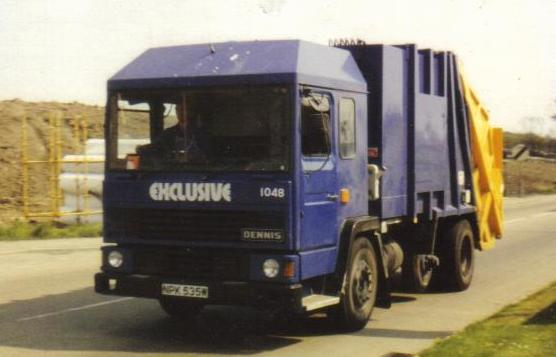
1981 dustcart

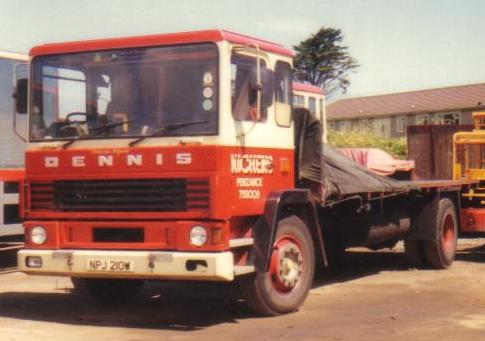
1981 Delta

The former Dennis Motors business was renamed Hestair Dennis by August 1977. A Queen's Award for Export was received in 1978. In February 1980 John Smith, the managing director of Hestair Dennis, was jailed for life in Baghdad for paying "huge amounts for commercial deals and secret information". Four of the Iraqis with him were hanged. He was not released until February 1988.

Phoenix was added as a brand name to all Dennis Eagle refuse collectors during 1978.

The Delta 1600 series trucks were launched, middleweight 16 tonne vehicles for tipper and haulage applications.

In February 1983, Hestair Dennis purchased Duple Coachbuilders. Between the two Hestair could produce complete vehicles with the new Duple-developed integrated body-chassis units. Duple owned Duple Metsec in Tipton, suppliers of bus body kits for assembly overseas. Hestair Duple 425 was displayed in October 1984 and in production a year later powered by Cummins engines. On 10 December 1985 Hestair Dennis Limited was renamed Dennis Specialist Vehicles Limited and again on 3 February 1986 to Hestair Specialist Vehicles Limited.

=== Special-vehicle division ===
==== Production moves to Warwick, Worcester, Blackpool ====
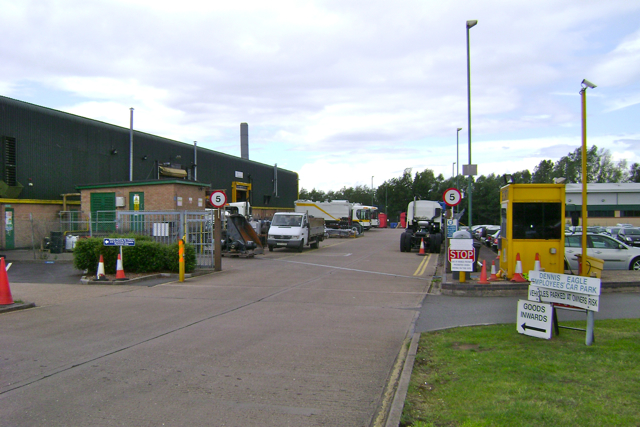
Dennis Eagle, Heathcote Industrial Estate in Warwick, 2009

In late 1985 a new 125,000 square foot Dennis Eagle plant on the Heathcote Industrial Estate in Warwick opened, taking over the building of Dennis municipal vehicle chassis and the matching Eagle bodies. Construction of chassis for buses and coaches as well as fire appliances remained at Guildford but that factory lost 600 jobs. Building of fire appliance bodies was moved to Carmichael Fire in Worcester and all cabs to Duple at Blackpool.

The re-organisation cost around £4 million covered by the sale of part of the original Dennis site. The Guildford workforce dropped from 700 to 400. Still one of Europe's largest builders of fire appliance chassis Dennis Specialist Vehicles was running at a loss.

In the 1980s bus engines stayed beneath the floor but were moved as far back as possible to release luggage space. At the October 1986 Commercial Motor Show Dennis introduced its Javelin design using a 6-cylinder Cummins engine mounted forward of the axle. Previous models had used Gardner engines.

The fire engineering division was closed and requirements contracted out to Carmichael in Worcester. At this time Dennis claimed 65 per cent of the fire engine market. John Dennis of the founders' family, previously coach and truck sales manager, left and set up John Dennis Coachbuilders to build complete fire engine bodies.

The remaining business was the manufacture of chassis for fire appliances and public service vehicles. Almost all the 35-acre Woodbridge Hill site was sold.

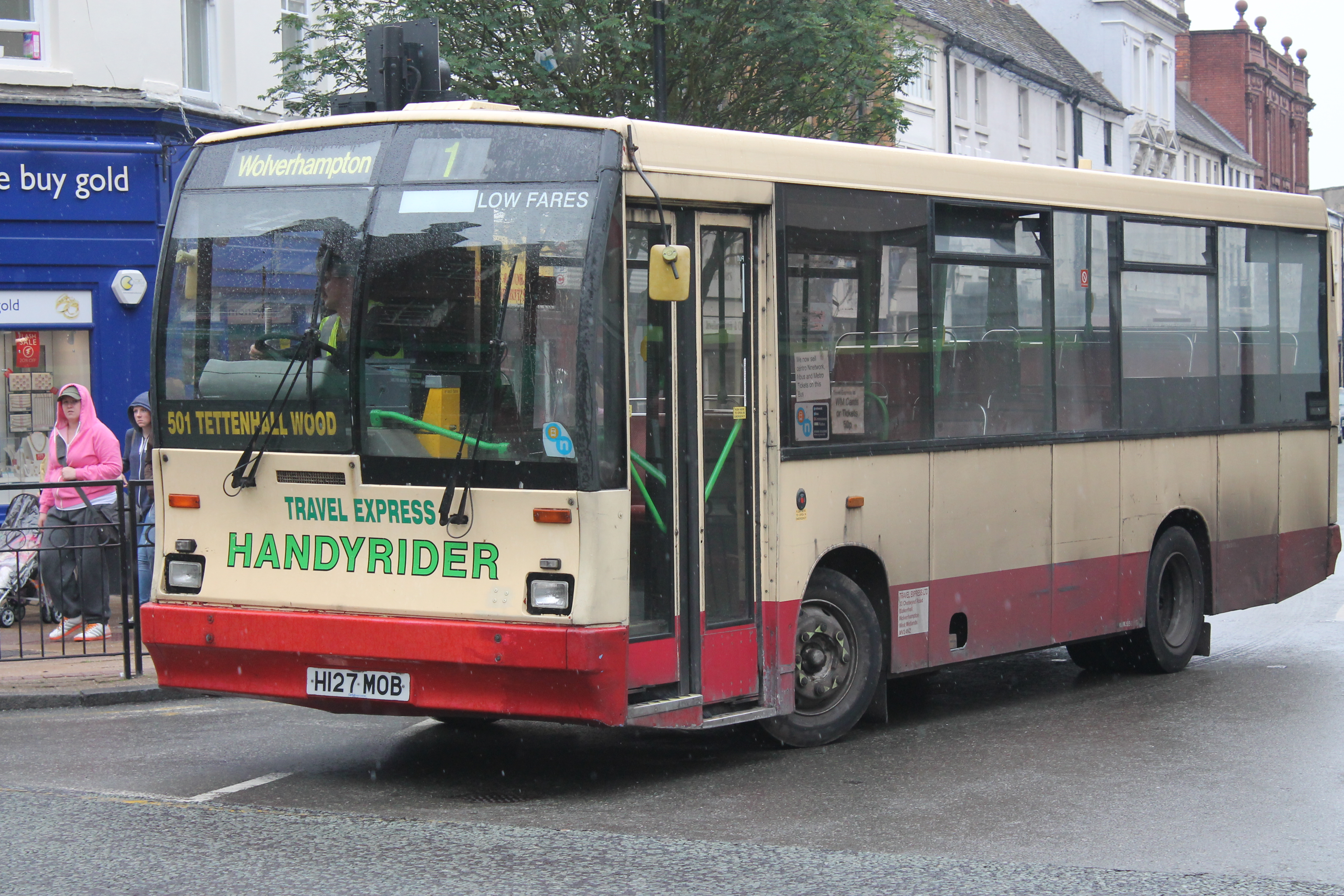
Dennis Dart built in 1990

At the October 1988 Motor Show Dennis and Duple displayed their new Dennis Dart midibus.

=== Management buy-out ===
At the end of 1988 the Vehicle Division of Hestair Engineering comprised:

- Warwick's Dennis Eagle which held around 35 per cent of the refuse collector market, much of which was now carried out by private contractors to the local authorities and there was no longer a steady regular demand for replacement vehicles. Dennis Eagle represented about one-third of the Vehicle Division
- Guildford's Dennis Special Vehicles building PSV and fire appliance chassis.
- Blackpool's Hestair Duple, the coach body builder with

Duple Services and
Duple Metsec selling bus body kits for export.
Bifort Engineering, a specialist in high technology plastic mouldings.

== Trinity Holdings ==
=== Trinity Holdings 1989 renamed Dennis Group in 1997 ===
Trinity Holdings, the management of the Vehicle Division of Hestair Engineering with the backing of banking institutions, bought Dennis from Hestair. Geoff Hollyhead, former head of the Vehicle Division, led the management buyout and was appointed chairman and CEO. The stated intention was to relist the Dennis group back on the London Stock Exchange.

Hestair Specialist Vehicles Limited was renamed Specialist Vehicles Limited on 7 March 1989.

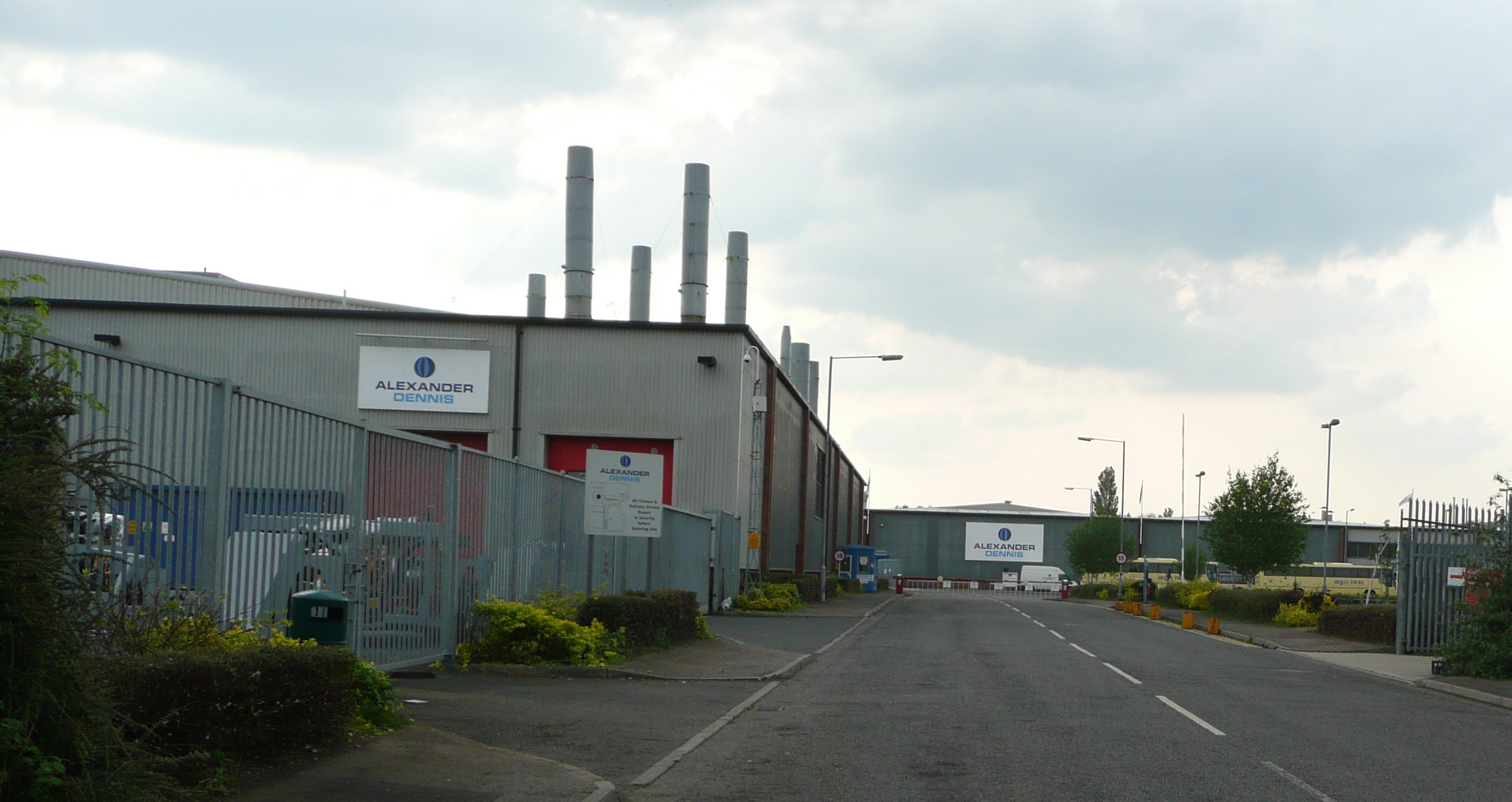
Alexander Dennis, Guildford factory in 2008

Duple Coachbuilders was closed down in July 1989 with 350 jobs lost. The parts and service business went to Plaxton, production of the 300 series and 425 Integral followed parts and service to Plaxton later. Plaxton took the Duple sites in London, Blackpool and Glasgow to enlarge their spares and repairs network. Dennis and Duple had developed the Dart, a midibus bought by London Transport as a one-man operated bus to replace their AEC Routemasters. At the end of 1989 Dart bodywork production moved from the closed Duple to Carlyle Works in Birmingham. The Dart was followed by the Lance which used independent front suspension to allow a low floor halfway down the vehicle.

The next year Guildford factory moved to Slyfield Industrial Estate and into new premises allowing room to increase production. The work force was more than 300.

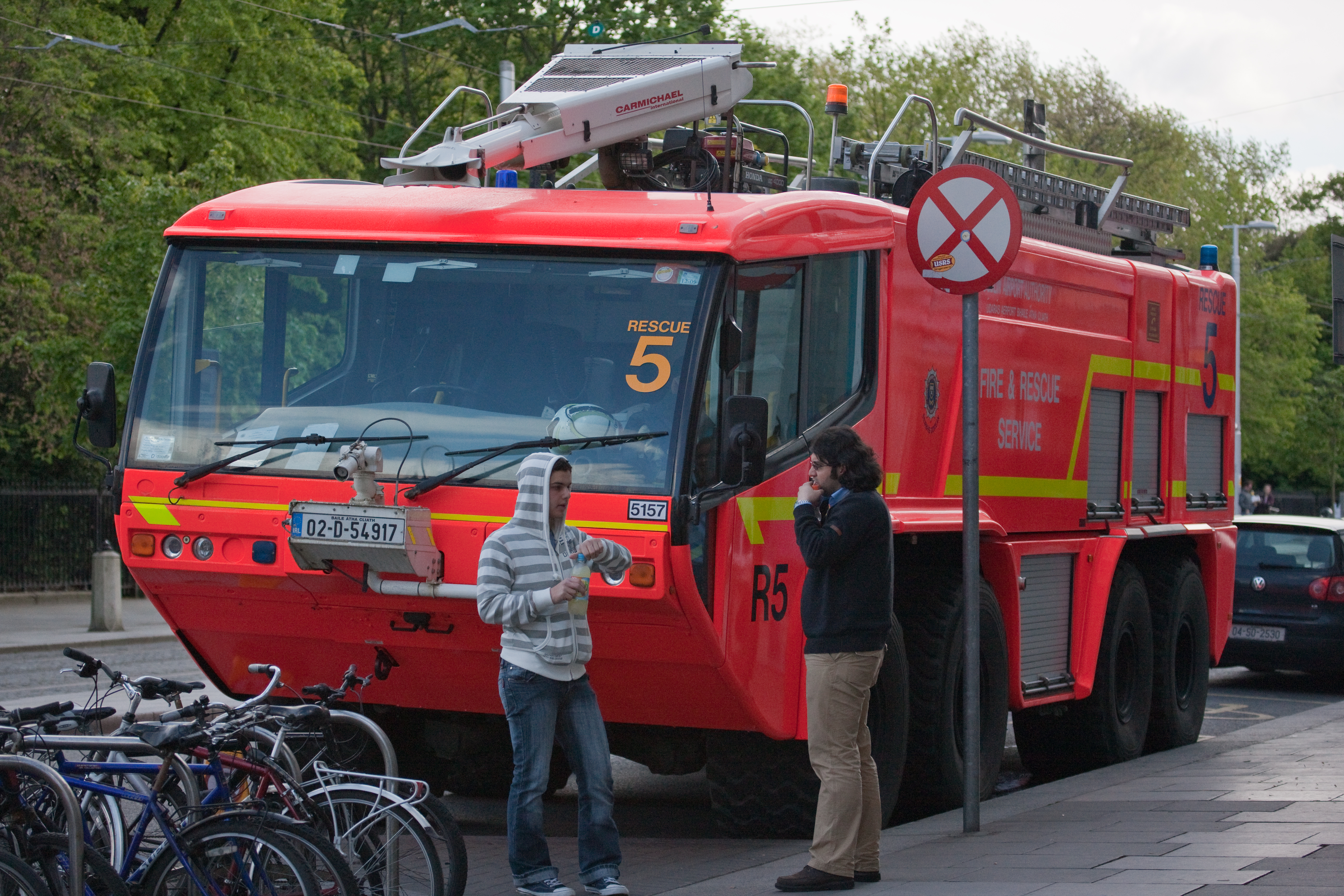
Carmichael Fire 8 x 8 airport crash tender in Dublin

Shelvoke's design rights were bought from the receiver in September 1991 and their parts and service depots at Merthyr Tydfil and Birmingham were taken over. Dennis now had 27 service outlets.

Carmichael Fire, a rival manufacturer of a range extending from Land Rover based fire tenders up to 8 x 8 airfield crash tenders, was rescued from its parent's receiver in 1992.

As intended Trinity Holdings was successfully floated in 1992. At that time it was described as a group of famous motor engineering names including Dennis fire engines, buses and dustcarts, Duple bus kits and Reliance Mercury airport tenders. Trinity claimed it was Europe's largest specialist vehicle producer making specialised products for niche markets. Dennis held 40 per cent of the British fire engine market, the Dart mid-sized bus was Britain's biggest seller.

In 1993, Trinity entered a joint venture with UMW in Malaysia to build buses in Malaysia from Guildford built chassis kits and Duple Metsec body kits. Trinity withdrew from the venture in 1998.

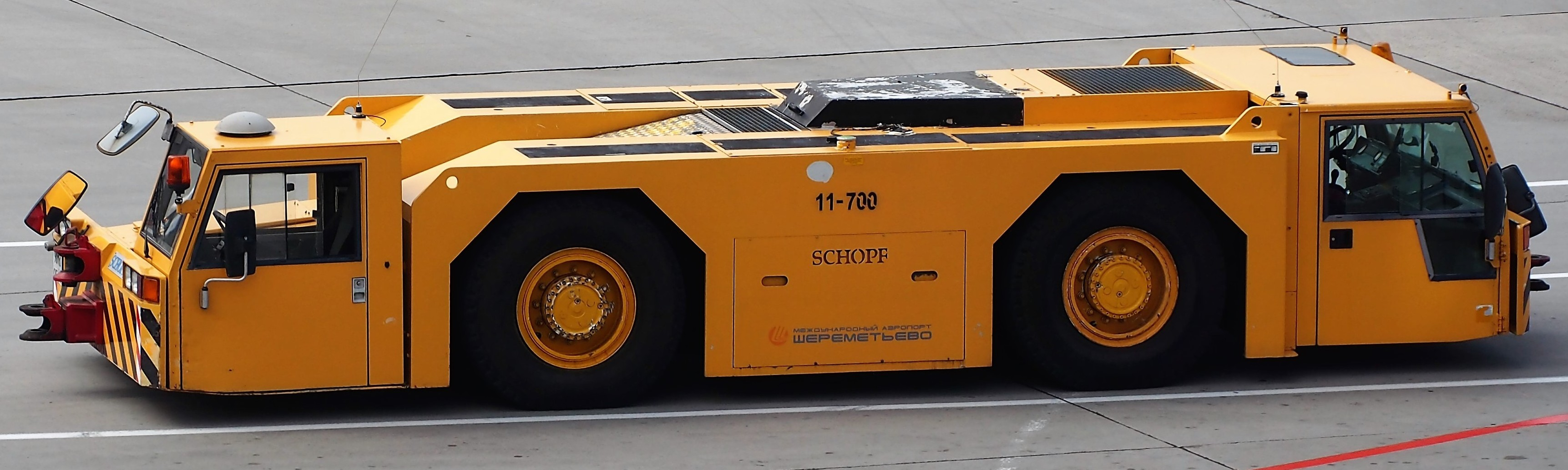
Schopf pushback vehicle

In December 1995, Trinity purchased the aircraft and cargo handling division of ML Holdings: Douglas Equipment and Schopf.

In October 1997 Trinity rebranded itself as the Dennis Group. It also revealed an order from Stagecoach Group for 100 Dennis Dart double-decker buses. In the first half of 1997, it produced made more than 1,000 buses and fire engines, restructured the assembly plant at Warwick and expanded its Guildford plant increasing capacity 25 per cent.

=== Low-floor bus chassis ===
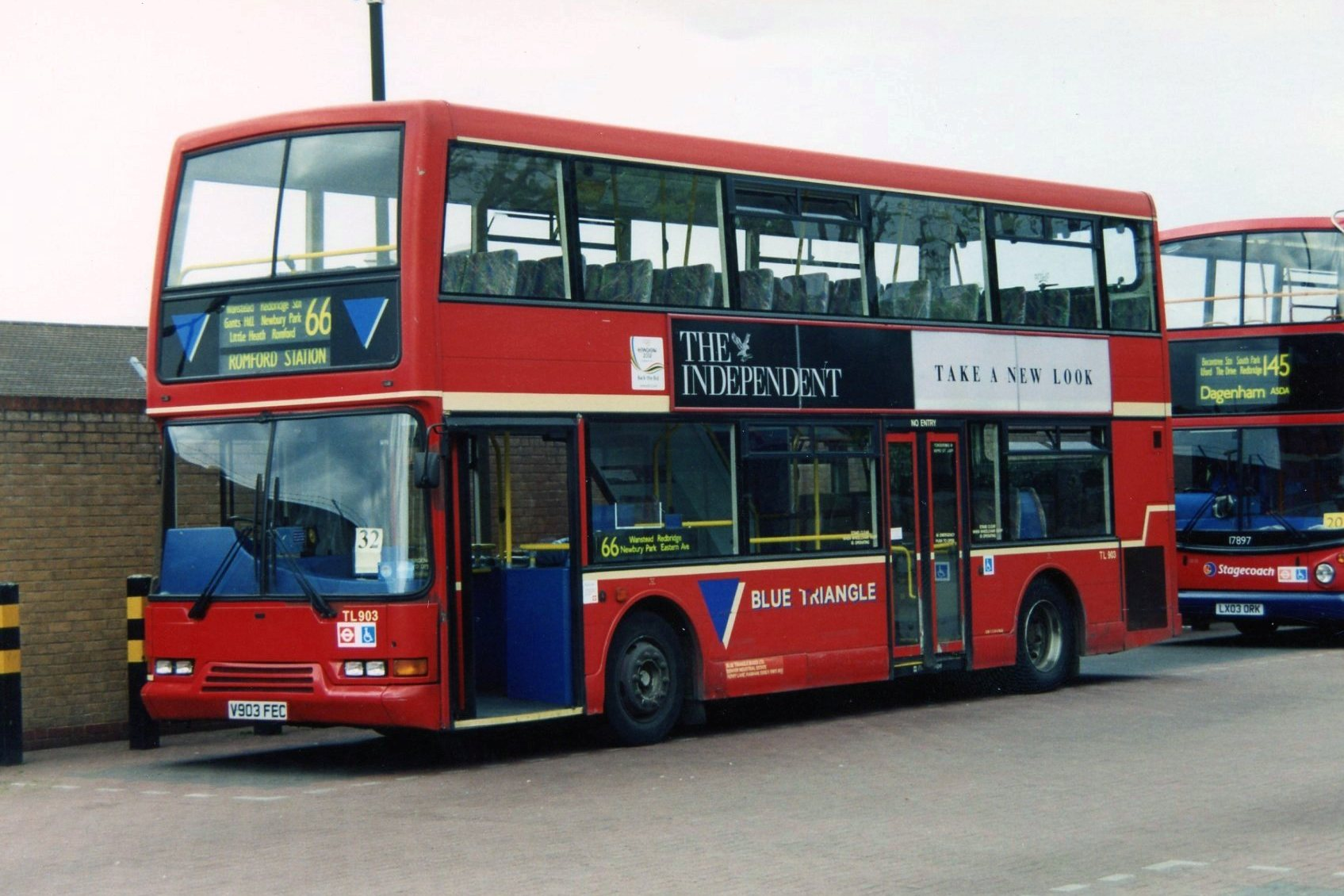
1999 Dennis Trident 2

Henlys Group, the new name for Plaxton, made buses which it often mounted on Dennis chassis. For some years they had together made double-deckers for Hong Kong and British Columbia and mini-buses for English customers. The Dennis and Henlys combined production held 40 per cent of the British market. Combined along with third partner Volvo they held the biggest share of the US market. It seemed logical to put the Henlys and Dennis businesses together and Henlys made an offer to Dennis Group shareholders.

Mayflower, an engineering group that owned bus bodybuilder Walter Alexander, felt threatened by the almost-completed Henlys-Dennis tie up and launched a bid for Dennis. Volvo responded by announcing its backing for the Henlys Dennis merger. Mayflower revealed a proposed alliance with Daimler-Benz including collaboration on development of chassis, technical support, power unit supply and worldwide distribution.

Mayflower was angling for the Dennis-Henlys (and Volvo) strong position in the US bus market. It was believed Dennis's low-floor bus chassis design would fit the expected US demand for wheelchair-friendly buses and less polluting bus engines. That market was estimated to be around 15,000 vehicles each year. Mayflower's other core division, Mayflower Vehicle Systems, supplied panels to European and US manufacturers.

Mayflower won the contested takeover bid for Dennis Group and within a few months disposed of two Dennis subsidiaries it did not want. Subsequent events showed Mayflower paid too much for Dennis.

=== Divestments ===
- Carmichael International, Worcester manufacturer of appliances from Land Rover-based vehicles to all-wheel drive Cobra 2 airfield crash tenders, was sold in February 1999.
- Dennis Eagle, Douglas Equipment and Schopf were sold in July 1999 to NatWest Equity Partners.

== TransBus International ==
The logo that was used. Still can be found on buses produced during TransBus' existence, for instance, the ALX400.

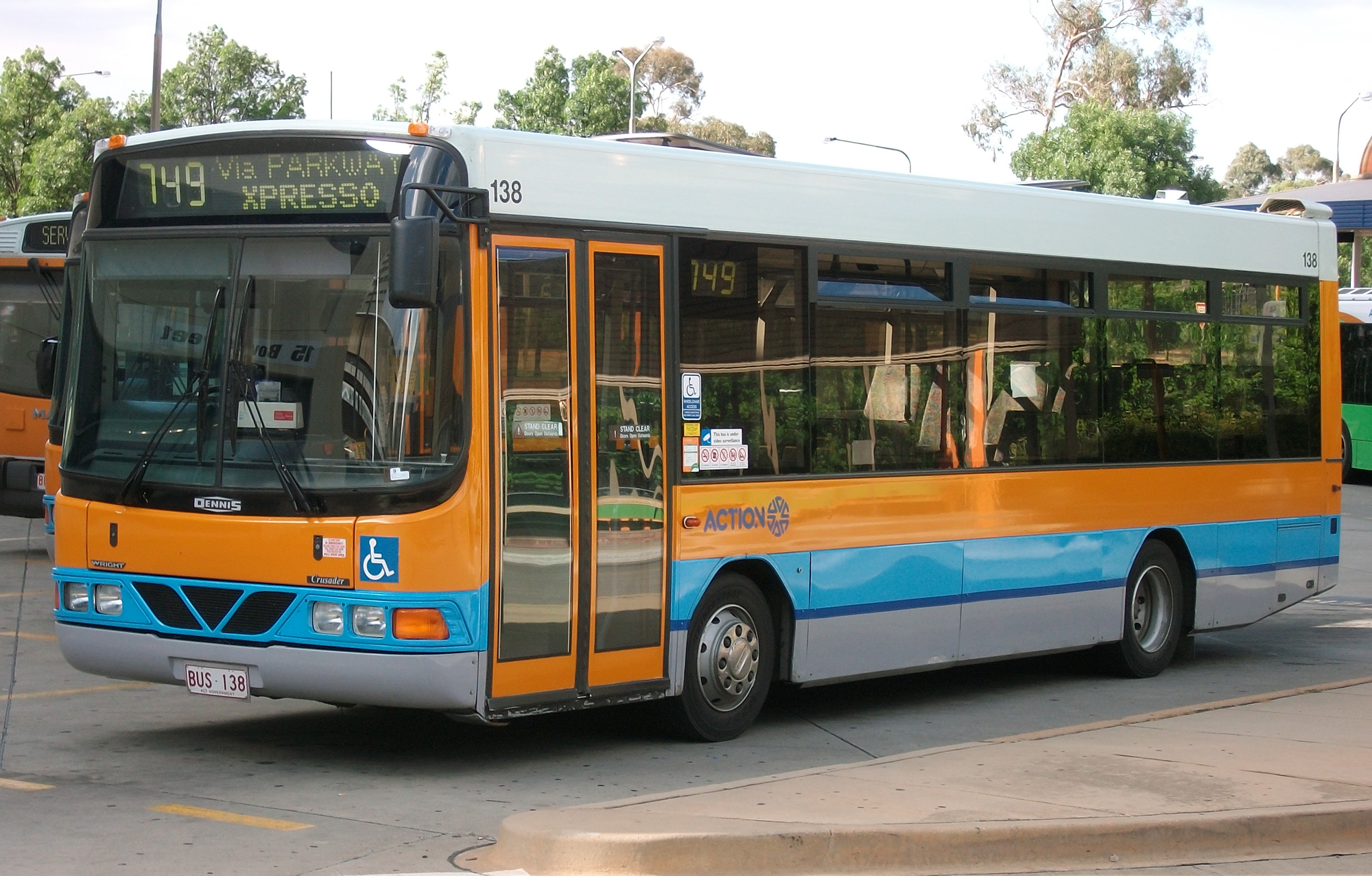
Wright Crusader bodied Dennis Dart in Canberra, Australia

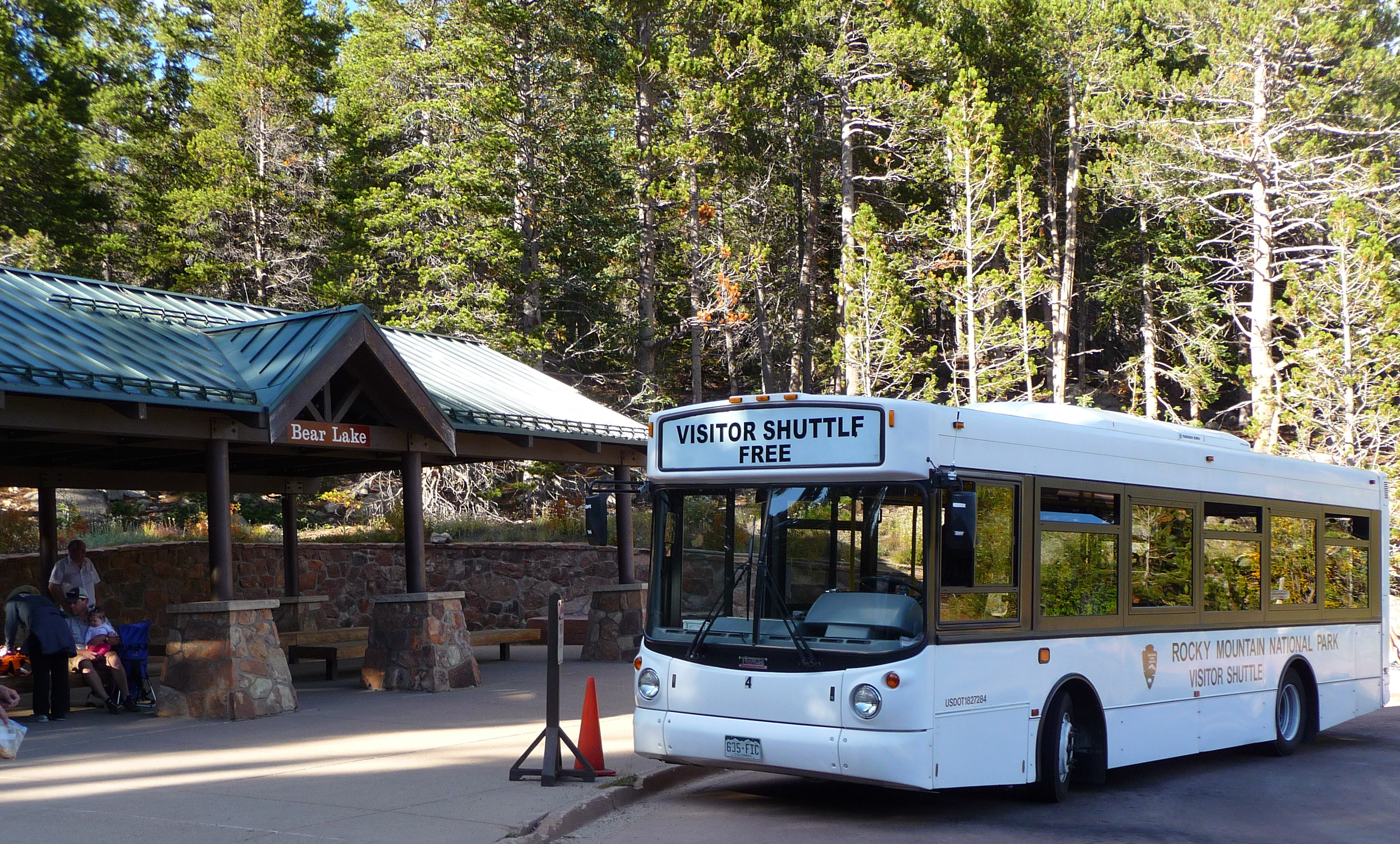
Alexander ALX200 bodied Dennis Dart in Rocky Mountain National Park

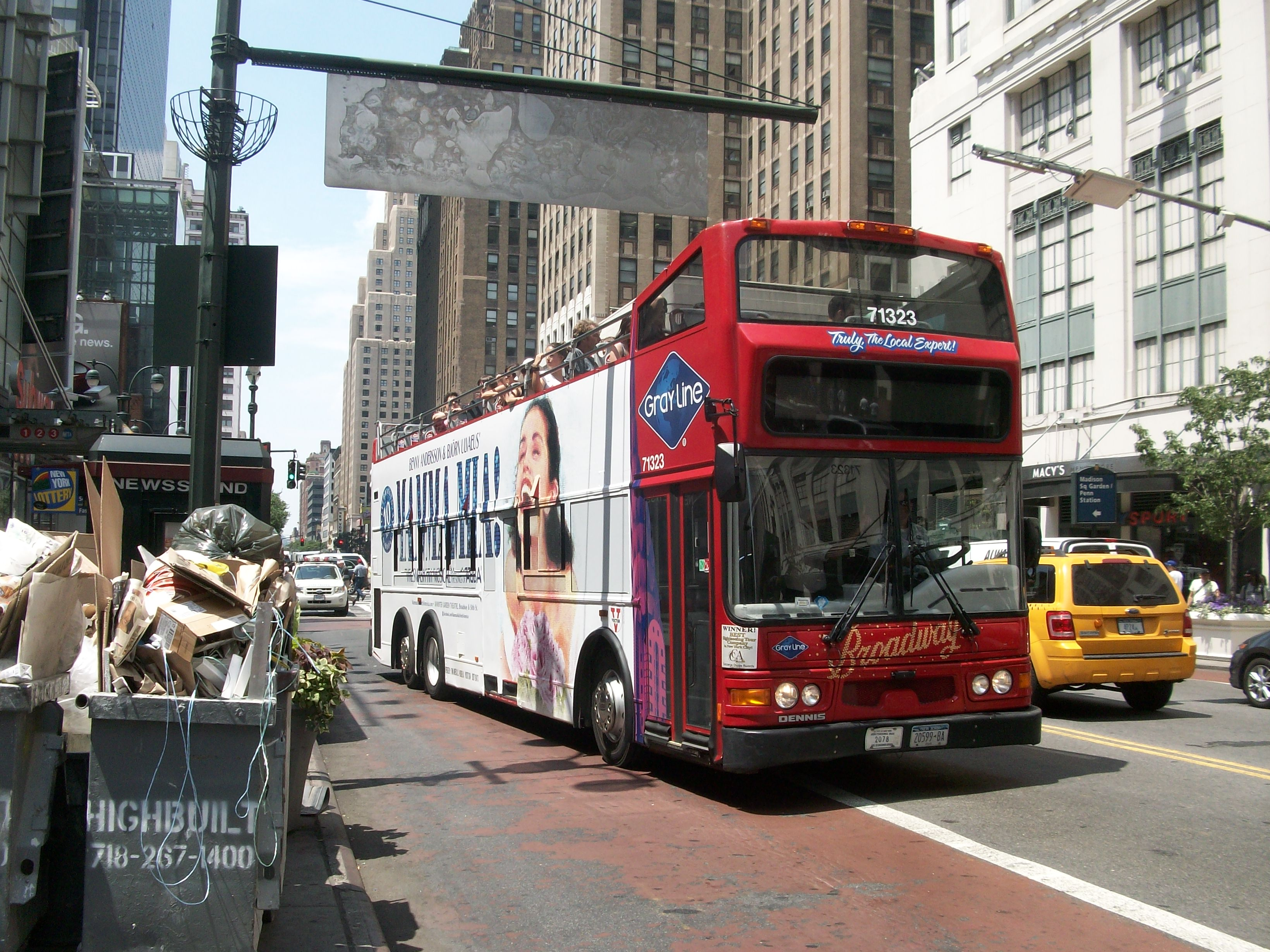
Dennis Trident 3 on Broadway

In 2000 Mayflower (Dennis and Alexander brands) and Henlys Group (Plaxton), aiming to save overheads, merged their British bus-making operations into a joint venture owned 70 per cent by Mayflower and 30 per cent by Henlys. The factories concerned employed 3,300 staff in seven places in Scotland and Yorkshire.

Specialist Vehicles Limited was renamed TransBus International Limited on 31 December 2002.

In March 2004, Mayflower was placed in administration amid accusations of four years of falsifying crucial company records as to customers' payments to HSBC, counting the same income twice. TransBus was also placed in administration. Eventually TransBus Plaxton was sold to its managers, Brian Davidson and Mike Keane with the support of a private equity group. TransBus Alexander and TransBus Dennis were bought by a consortium which included David Murray, Brian Souter and Ann Gloag, and was branded Alexander Dennis.

TransBus International was dissolved on 19 June 2018, after several times being restored from dissolution since 2008. Manufacturing activity at Guildford, meanwhile, ceased in 2020 with the move of Alexander Dennis chassis production from the Slyfield Industrial Estate site to the main Alexander Dennis factory in Falkirk, with up to 200 jobs affected as a result.

== Products ==
=== Fire engines ===
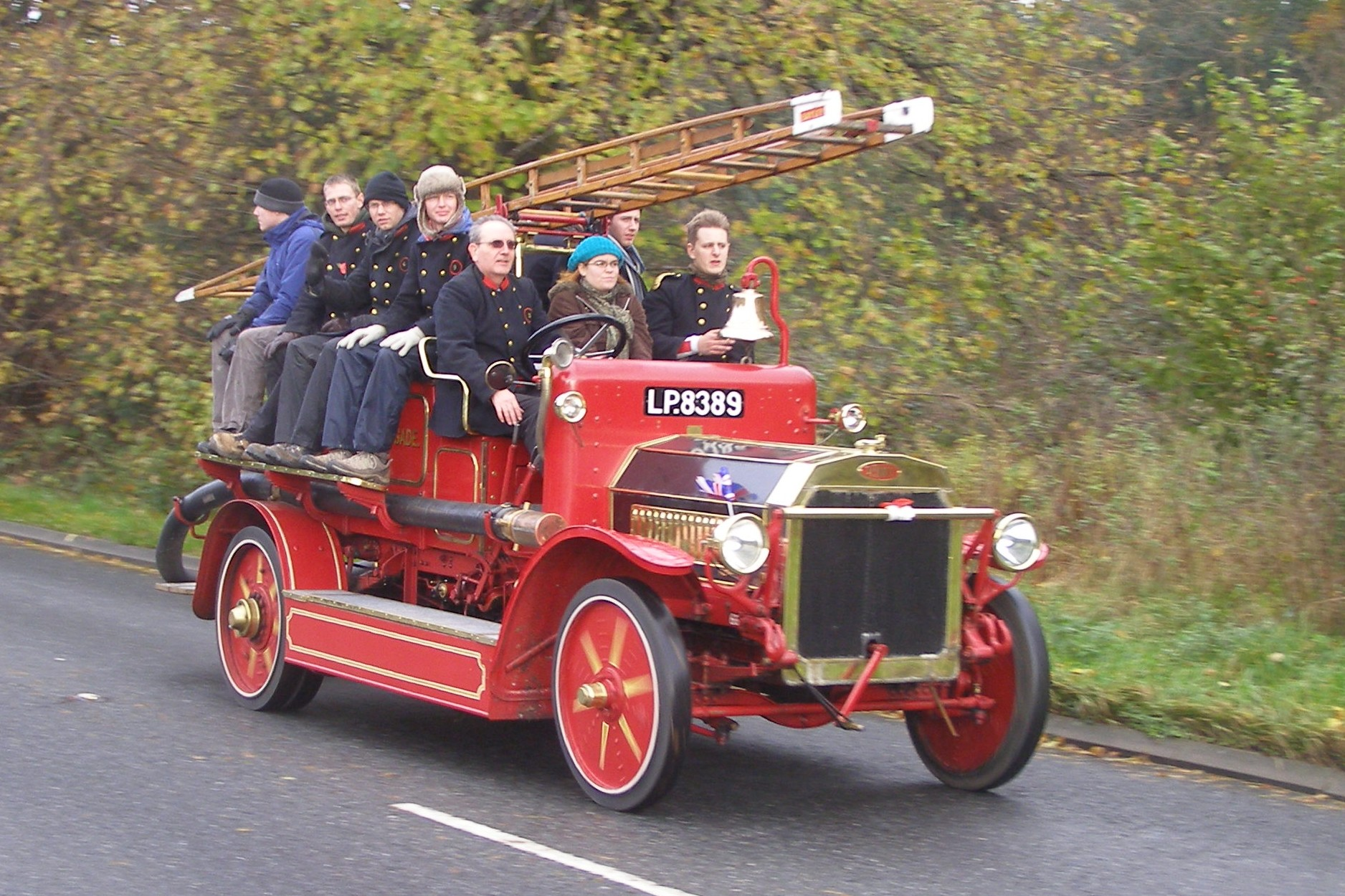
1916 N-Type fire engine Jezebel

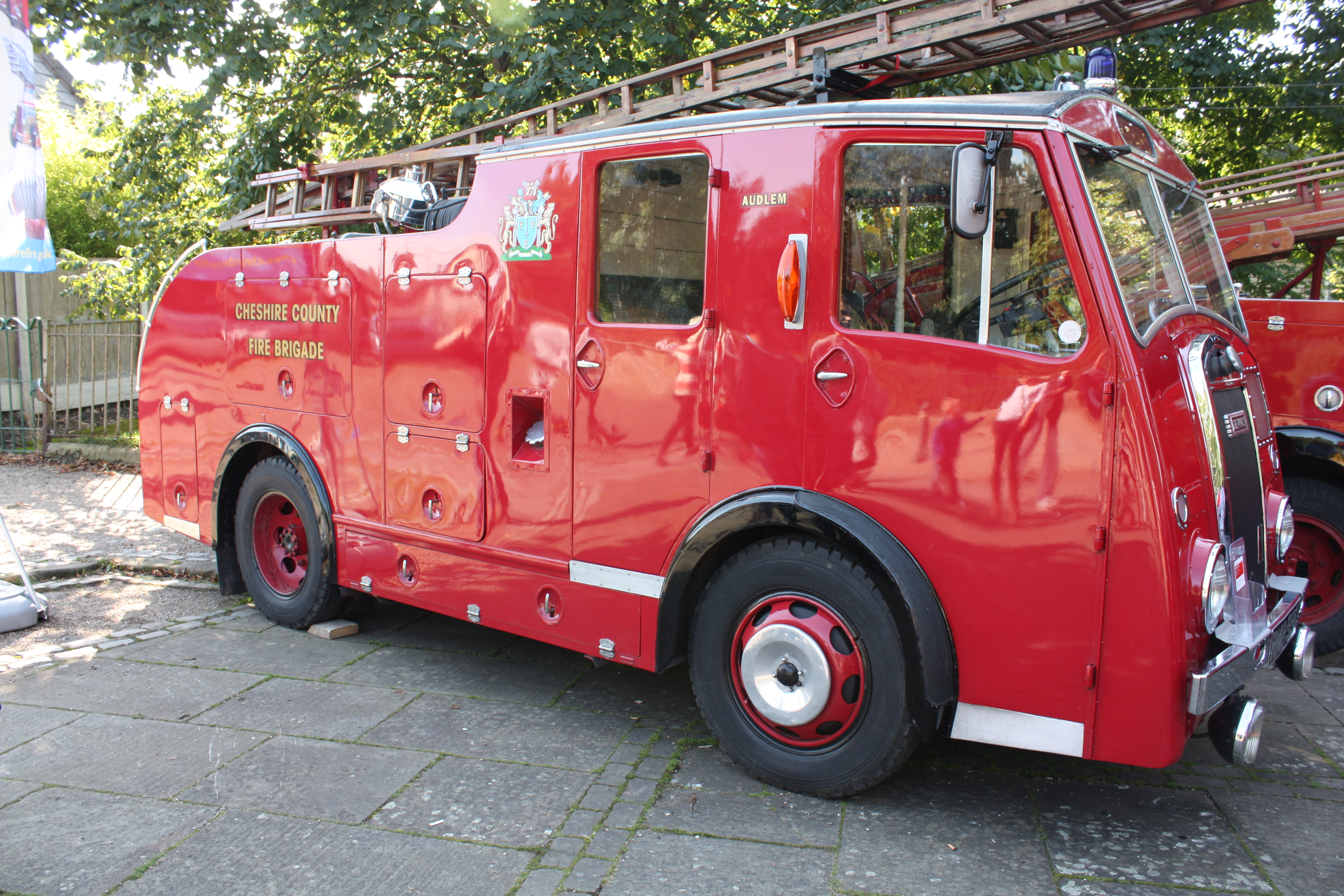
1953 F8 Fire Water Tender

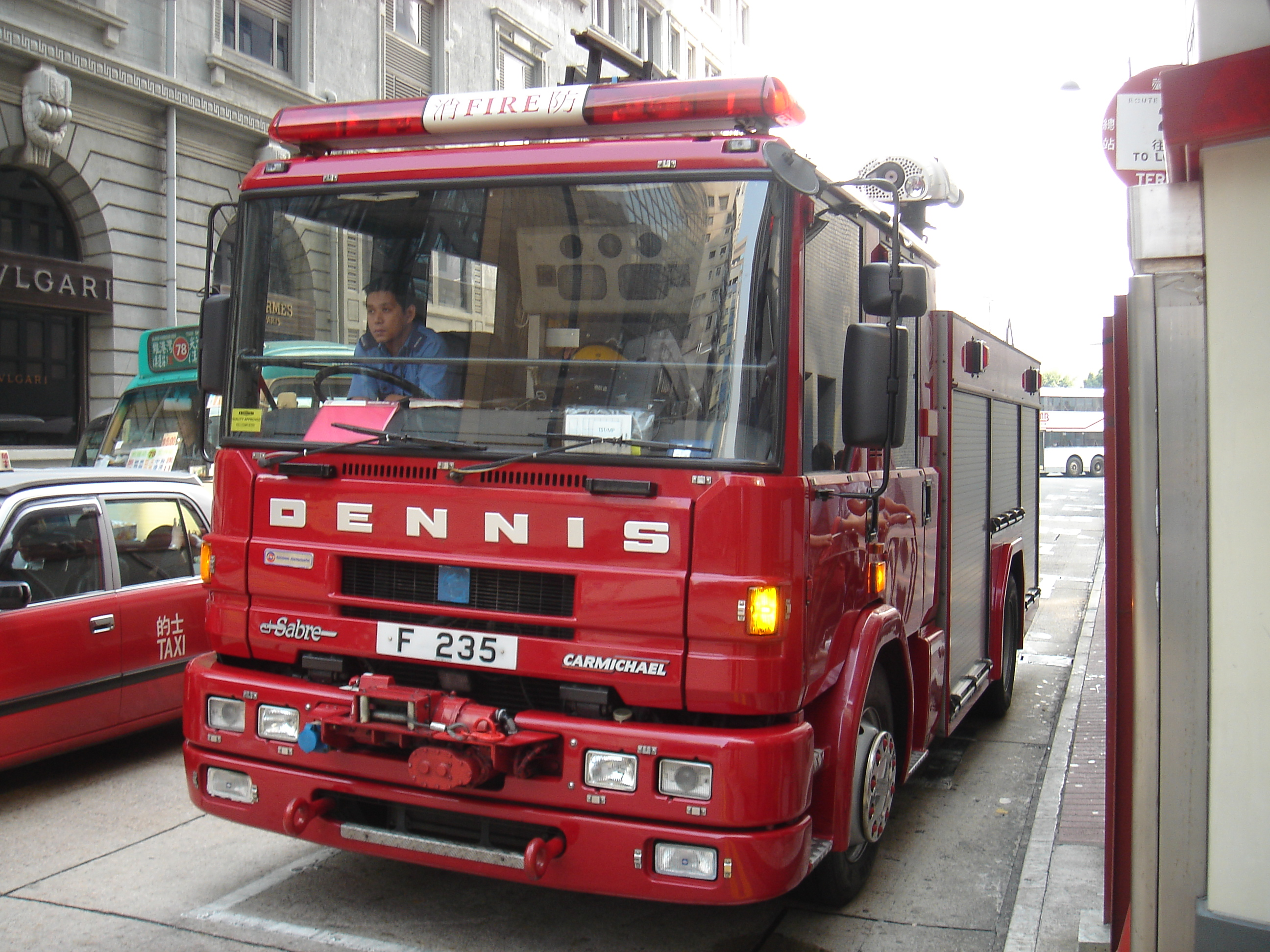
Hong Kong Fire Services Department Dennis Sabre fire engine

Dennis fire engines were noted, from their 1908 outset, for their use of a Gwynnes made centrifugal pump or 'turbine' as a water pump, rather than the piston pumps used by other makers. This was more complex to build than the long-established piston pumps, but had advantages in operation. Where water was supplied under pressure from a hydrant, rather than by suction from a pond, this additional pressure was boosted through the centrifugal pump, whereas a piston pump would have throttled it. Piston pumps also gave a pulsating outlet pressure which required an air-filled receiver to even this out.

The Karnataka Fire and Emergency Services owns a pumper that was built by Dennis Brothers and delivered to the erstwhile Kingdom of Mysore in 1925 from England.

- N-Type 1905-1920s
- G-Type
- Big Four
- Big Six
- Light Four
- Ace
- F series - 1946-1970s
- Delta
- D series
- DS series - 1980s-1990s
- R series - 1976-?
- RS/SS series - 1978-1990s
- DF series
- DFS series
- TF series
- TSD series
- Sabre - 1995–2007
- Rapier - 1991- Early 2000s
- Dagger -1998-2007

=== Military vehicles of World War I ===
Over 7,000 Dennis 3-Ton lorries were built for the War Department during World War I. These 3-Ton lorries could reach 55 miles per hour and climb gradients as steep as 1 in 6.

=== Buses ===
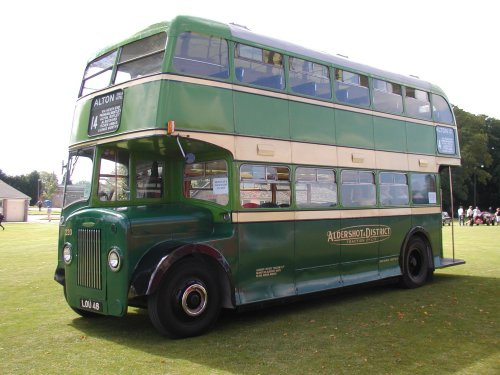
Dennis Lance bus in Aldershot & District Traction Company livery

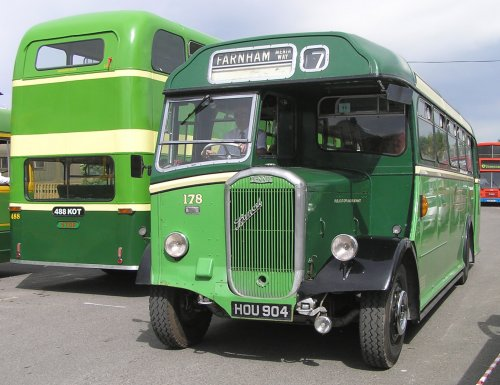
Dennis Lancet bus in Aldershot & District Traction livery

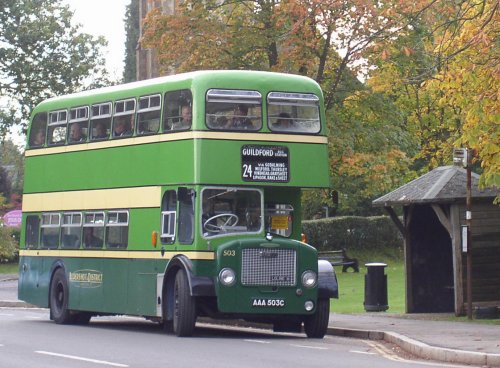
Dennis Loline III bus

1926–1967

- E/EV (front-engined single decker)
- F/FS (bonneted single decker)
- G/GL (bonneted small capacity bus)
- H/HS/HV (front-engined double decker)
- Dart (bonneted small capacity bus)
- Arrow (front-engined single decker)
- Lancet/Lancet 2/Lancet 3/Lancet 4 (front-engined single decker)
- Lance/Lance 2/Lance 3 (front-engined double decker)
- Ace (front-engined small capacity bus)
- Mace (front-engined small capacity bus)
- Falcon (front-engined small capacity bus)
- Pike
- Dominant (underfloor-engined single decker)
- Lancet UF (underfloor-engined single decker)
- Pelican (underfloor-engined light-weight single decker)
- Loline

1977–2000

- Dominator
- Jubilant
- Dart - front-engined full-size single-decker bus built in late 1970s
- Falcon
- Lancet
- Dragon/Condor
- Dorchester
- Domino
- Underframe of Duple 425 coach
- Javelin
- Dart/Dart SLF
- Lance/Arrow/Lance SLF
- Trident 2
- Trident 3
- R-Series

=== Trucks ===
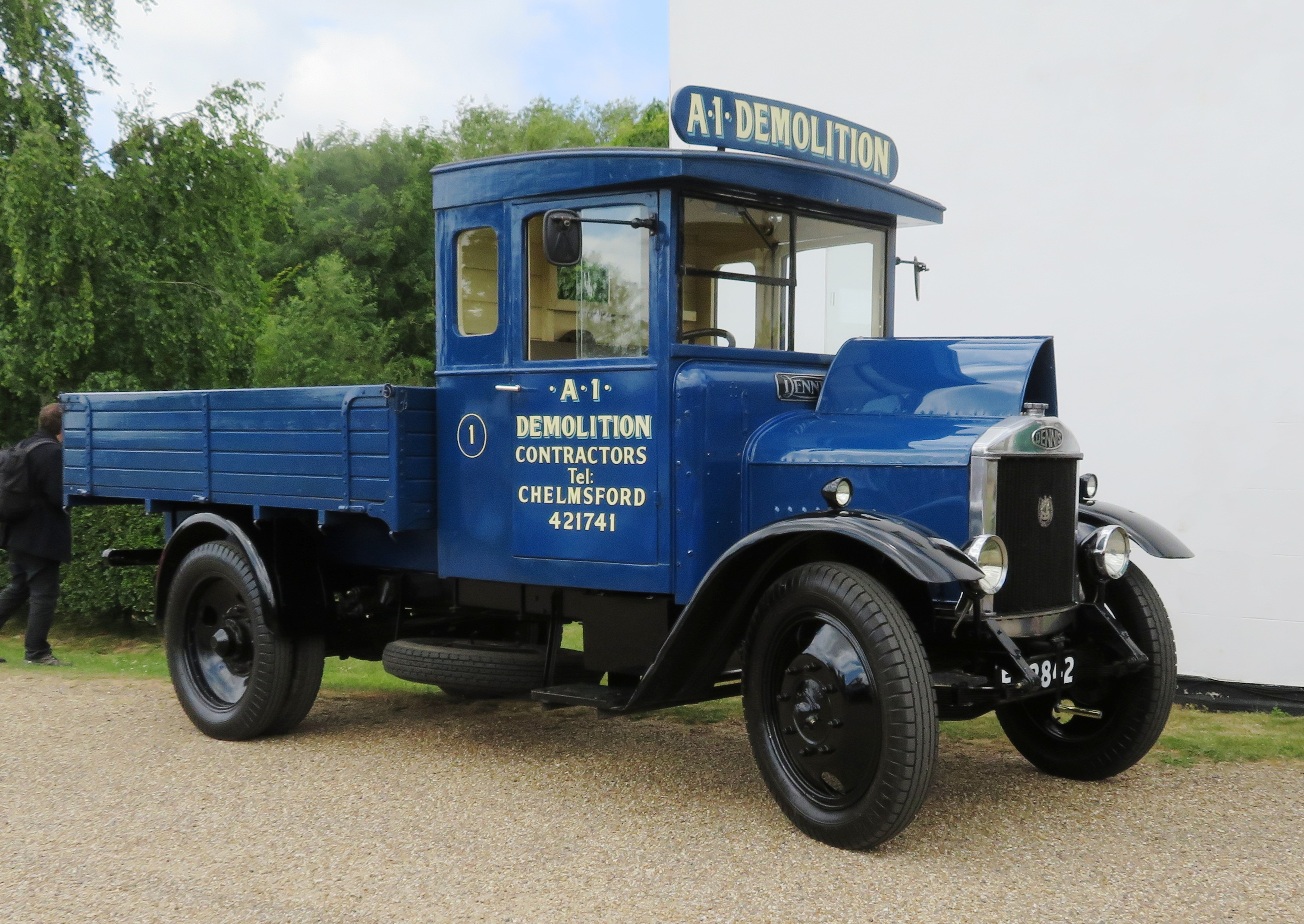
1931 Dennis 30 cwt

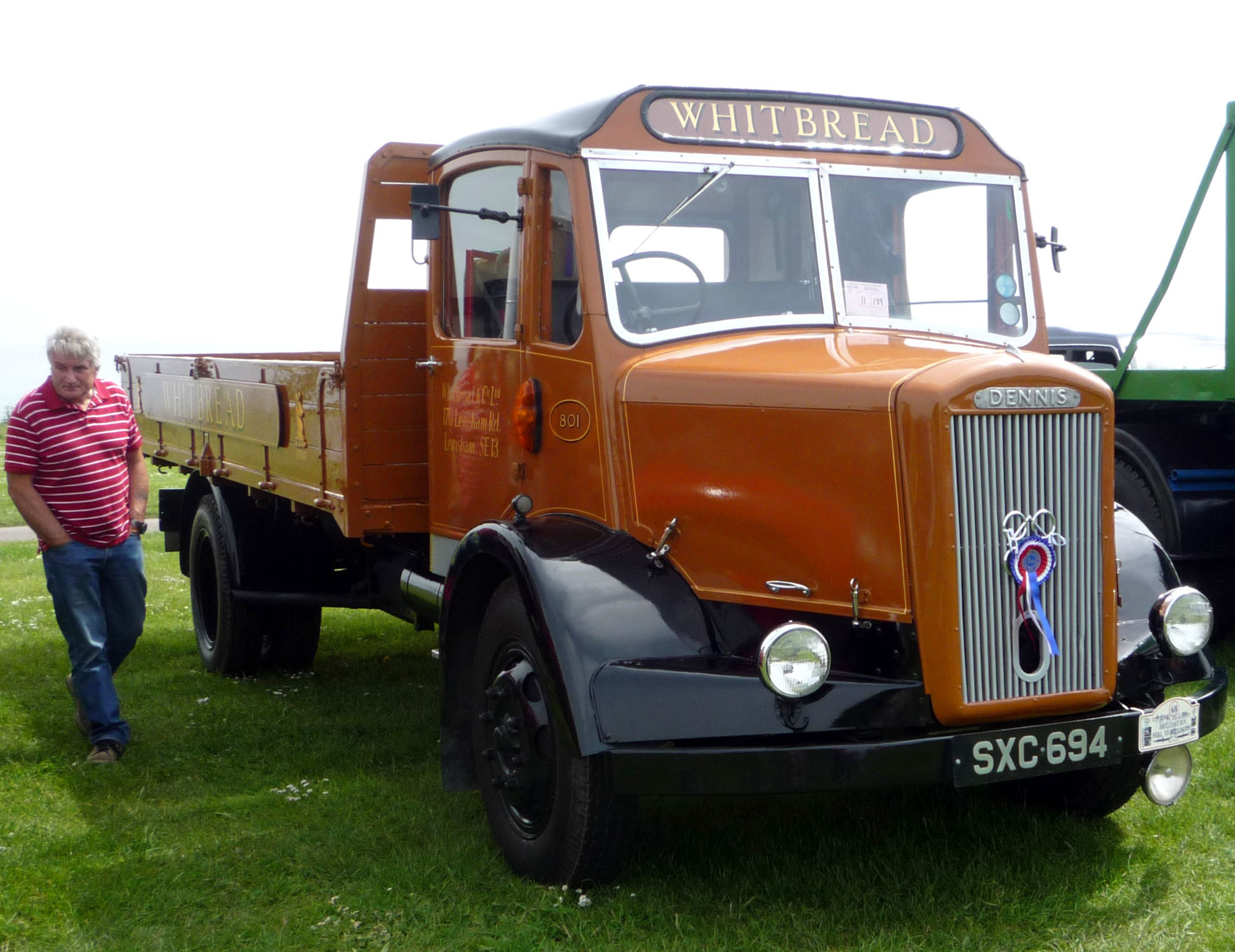
1956 Dennis Pax

Between wars

- Ace
- Max
- Max Major

Post war

- Pax
- Horia
- Centaur
- Jubilant
- Stork
- Hefty
- Condor
- Heron
- Paravan
- Maxim
- Delta

=== Refuse trucks ===
Dennis were noted as specialist makers of refuse collection trucks, with compactors, bin lifters, tipper-body emptying and other specialised features for this market. The same market is now served by Dennis Eagle.

=== Military vehicles of World War II ===
- Loyd Carrier
- Churchill Tank
- Light Artillery Tractor 6 x 6 'Octolat' (a misnomer, standing for 'eight wheel light artillery tractor, retained when the design was abbreviated by one axle to reduce length and weight, and improve handling).

Conceived to meet a requirement for a simple easily produced and maintained alternative to the effective but costly and complicated Quad 4 x 4 tractor, the Dennis design steered on the first pair of wheels but dispensed with springs, substituting six oversized tyres for conventional suspension.

A centre-control driving position in a shallow lightly armoured body provided with ammunition lockers and sheltered under an overall canvas tilt resulted in a vehicle not instantly recognisable as truck. (Prototypes used a box body in place of the simple platform and conventional cab). Early models were powered by twin coupled Bedford engines but the final design was powered by a powerful Leyland 9.8 litre engine. Length was 20 feet (6 metres), height 7 ft 6 inches (2.3 metres) high.

Despite promising test results no production order was forthcoming.

== Joint ventures ==
- UMW-Dennis Specialist Vehicles - joint venture with UMW, based in Malaysia (1995–2002), renamed UMW Vehicle Components after the end of joint venture
- Thomas Dennis - joint venture with Thomas Built Buses, based in the United States (1999–2003), renamed DaimlerChrysler Commercial Buses North Carolina after the end of joint venture
