= Mercury Truck & Tractor Company =

English industrial vehicle manufacturer

- Industry: Industrial Vehicles; Airfield Ground support equipment
- Founded: 1935
- Successor: Dennis Brothers
- Headquarters: Gloucester, England

The Mercury Truck & Tractor Company was based in Gloucester, England and manufactured small industrial vehicles for use primarily within factories carrying loads or hauling trailers, road vehicles for moving rail trucks in yards, and vehicles for airfields for towing munitions trolleys or baggage trolleys. In later years they produced increasingly powerful aircraft tugs.

== Company history ==
The company started making trucks and tractors in 1935, and in July that year the War Department placed an order with them for 'power-driven trucks'. The original company address was Northgate House, 19 London Road, Gloucester, around 1957 the address changed to The Quay, Gloucester. In addition to load carriers, they produced small tug (tractor) units for towing trailer-borne loads on flat surfaces, such as yards, factories, and airfields. Many of these vehicles are readily identified by the company name on the top of the radiator and the lettering M.T. & T. Co on the sides of the radiator, but a few have the 'Mertrak' name instead.

The company exhibited at the first Mechanical Handling Exhibition (1948) and many subsequent exhibitions.

The company and the related companies (Mercury Airfield Equipment Ltd and Mercury Snow Control Ltd) were absorbed into the Dennis Group in 1964. The managing director of all 3 Mercury companies, R.T. Barnfield, was given a place on the board at Dennis Bros. and two Dennis directors were appointed to the Mercury boards. In the reporting of the takeover, it was stated "The Mercury Group does not manufacture in Gloucester, although it has trading associations with another company in the city", it was also mentioned that "Mercury sell a considerable amount of Canadian snow clearing equipment under licence".

In 1972 Dennis was acquired by Hestair Group, which sold Mercury Truck and Tractor and Mercury Airfield Equipment to Marshalls (Halifax). Marshalls combined the Mercury operations with their Reliance Trucks business to form Reliance-Mercury, a successful company with a management buyout in 1987, followed by an acquisition by Powersafe Industries Ltd in 1990. When Powersafe failed in 1992, Reliance-Mercury were bought by Trinity Holdings, who in 1995 bought Douglas Equipment of Cheltenham. These two companies were merged, and the Reliance Mercury name was dropped a few years later.

== Products ==
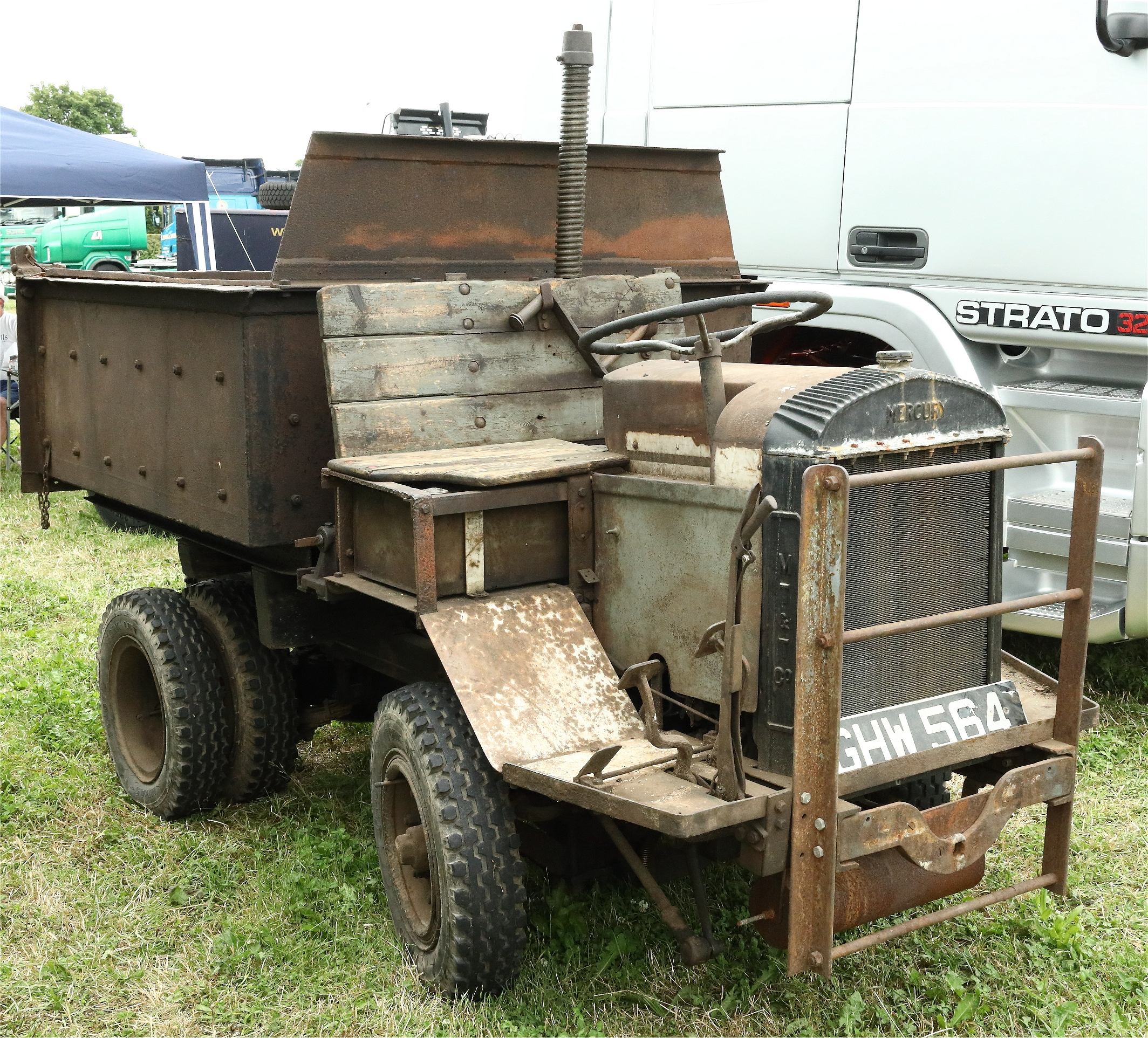
Mercury Truck and Tractor Co 10F2 Tipper

Pre-war product literature is scarce, but several preserved examples exist of small four-wheel towing tractors from the late 1930s. These are heavily built, powered by four-cylinder side-valve engines, and appear the same as later 10F models.

In 1941, their main product was the small 10F2 truck, a 10HP truck with a 2-ton payload. While intended for yards and factories, it could be used on the road (although the top speed was only 12mph) and was available with a cab. The standard wheelbase was only 5ft 2in, but there were options for longer wheelbases. Tyres were pneumatic with double wheels at the back. When loaded, it was also capable of towing 5-6 tons on a trailer. At the 1947 Road and Transport Exhibition they showed a version of the 10F2 chassis with a steel tipping body 3ft 9in wide. Among its claimed uses were carrying materials for road repairs.

Mercury displayed four types of vehicles at the first Mechanical Handling Exhibition (in 1948). This included an oil-engined shunting tractor (with Perkins 45hp engine) - which was said to be similar to their existing 25AM petrol-engined tractor, which was capable of pushing 60 tons on rails. The 10F was a compact, powerful tractor to tow trailer loads. The 10F2 model was also shown.

At the 1950 Mechanical Handling Exhibition, the 20cwt 10F2 was joined by the 25cwt 10F25, and three towing tractors were shown, the 10F able to tow a trailer of 7 tons, the Medium 40 tractor with 40HP engine able to tow 40 tons, and the oil-engined Airtug-46 (intended for towing aircraft) capable of towing 70 tons.

In 1952, they announced the Model 40 Shuntug, a dual-purpose road tractor able to haul 100 tons on rail or 40 tons on the road. In 1954 they announced that British Rail had placed orders for their new oil-engined 55F Shuntug, a compact tractor with a drawbar load of 5500lb.

New models in 1956 were small 1-ton and 2-ton tipper trucks with hydraulic tipping gear using a horizontal ram – the 2-ton being available with oil engine or petrol.

By 1960, they had developed new, more powerful aircraft tugs, the 70P with 70bhp Perkins engine could tow aircraft up to the weight of the Bristol Britannia, and the new 160L (with 160bhp Leyland O.680 engine) could cope with the Boeing 707 and similar aircraft (i.e., tow the aircraft up a slope of 1 in 40 against a 25knot headwind).

Production was not restricted to airfield ground support equipment, and in 1961 they announced the shipment of 26 of their 40P tractors to Bahrain Port.

In 1962 at the Mechanical Handling Exhibition, they announced the new Airtug 170F with a drawbar pull of 17,000 pounds and an integral 3-speed epicyclic gearbox.

== Preserved Examples ==
Several of the 10F and 10F2 trucks have been restored and preserved. The 10F2 pictured above has been used to demonstrate old roadbuilding methods at many classic UK vehicle shows.

10F tractor units can be found in a few airfield museums, as their most common use appears to be hauling trailers on airfields and sometimes on railway station platforms.

The Brooklands Museum has a 1956 example of the airfield small tractor unit in BEA colours fitted with a cab (registration RGC145). Another preserved example is to be found at the Norfolk and Suffolk Aviation Museum, although now in aviation colours, this is believed to have originally been used by British Rail.

The Midland Railway – Butterley has a small powered rail unit (currently stored), apparently converted from a Mercury road tractor delivered to LMS.
