= Carmichael (manufacturer) =

- Industry: Fire engine manufacturer
- Founded: 1947; 78 years ago
- Headquarters: United Kingdom
- Parent: Dongguan Yongqiang Vehicles Manufacturing Co., Ltd.
- Website: www.simonigl.com

Carmichael, acquired by Simon Carmichael International Group Ltd., now known as SIG, is a British manufacturer of specialist fire-fighting vehicles in Worcester, member of Guangdong Yongqiang Auld Lang Real International Fire Fighting Vehicles Ltd.

== History ==
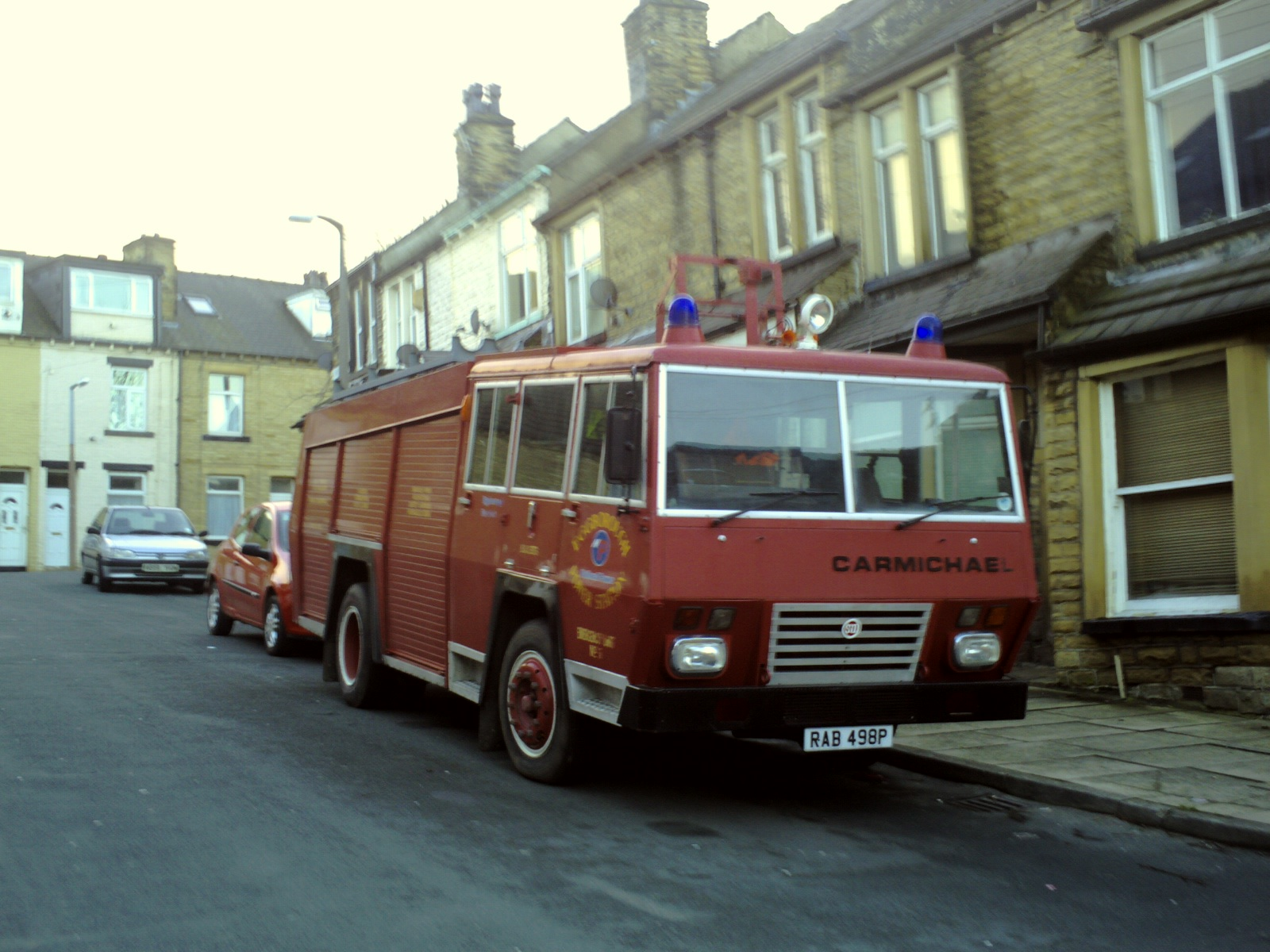
Mid-1970s fire tender

It was formed in 1849 as coachbuilders.

=== Fire service vehicles ===
Carmichael & Sons made its first fire engines in 1947 for the Worcester Fire Brigade (now part of the Hereford and Worcester Fire and Rescue Service).

In 1962 it made its first fire tender for airfields (airport crash tender).

=== Ownership ===
In the 1970s it was known as Carmichael Fire & Bulk Ltd.

In 1992 it became Carmichael International Ltd (CIL) and was liquidated in 2004.,

AMDAC Carmichael Ltd (ACL) bought all assets of CIL and continued all operations with the UK. ACL went into Liquidation in 2016.

Carmichael Support Services Ltd bought all assets of ACL and continue to trade, manufacture and support fire and rescue vehicles at the former ACL Facility in Worcester UK. Carmichael Support Services Limited changed its trading name to CSS Fire Vehicles Limited on 26 January 2018.

CSS Fire Vehicle are bought by netherlands Royal Terberg Group in 2018.

== Structure ==
It is situated in the south-west of Worcester, east of the A449 on the Venture Business Park, near Lower Wick, and next door to Worcester Citizens' Swimming Pool.

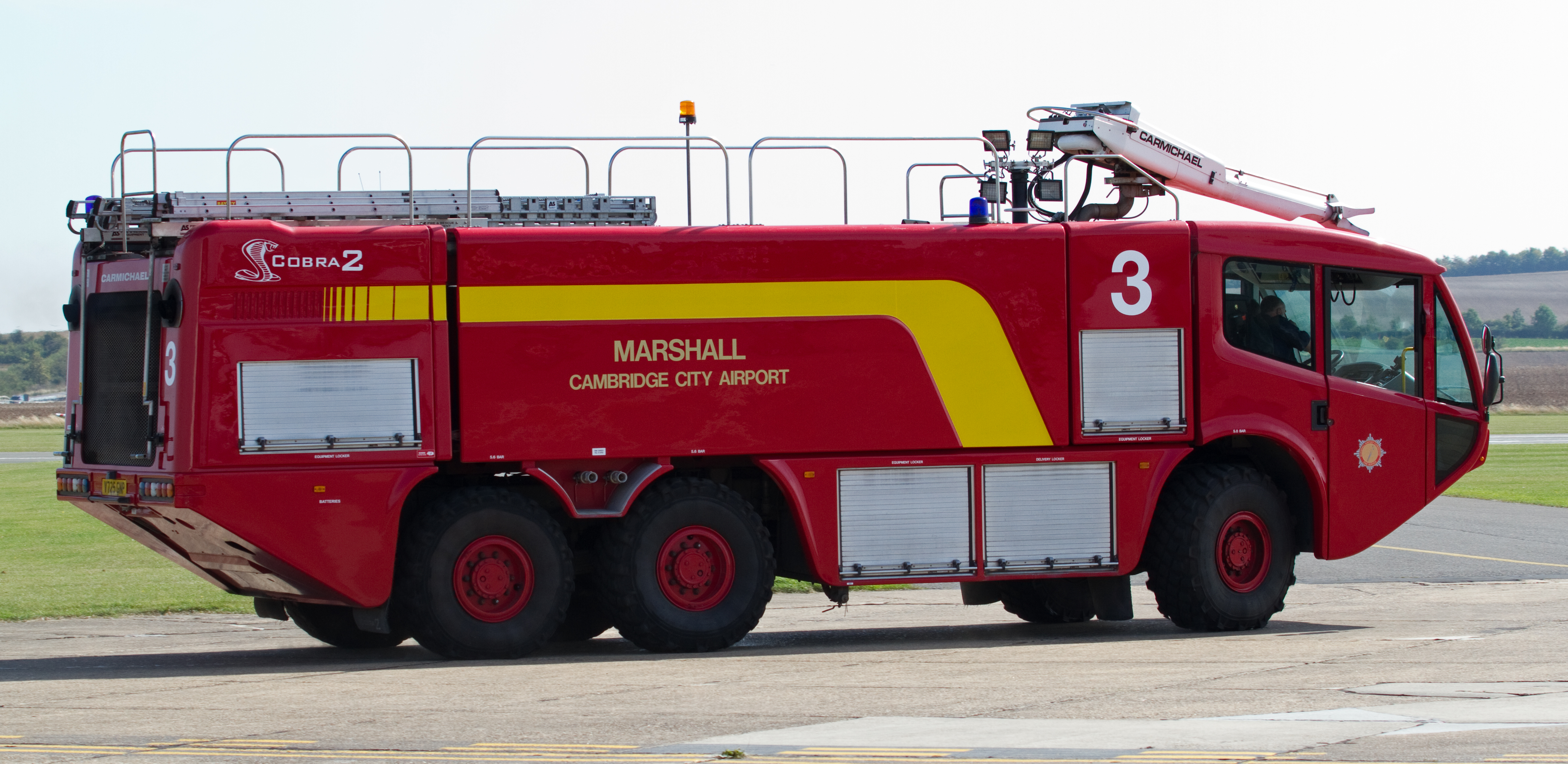
Fire tender at Cambridge Airport in September 2011

== Products ==
It makes fire tenders for many of the UK's fire services. It has also made tankers for road vehicle transport. It makes fire tenders for airports and RAF stations.

== See also ==
- Category:Aircraft fires
- Airport rescue and firefighting services in the United Kingdom
- Fire appliances in the United Kingdom
- Terberg and Schopf, manufacturer of similar vehicles
