= Schopf =

SCHOPF Maschinenbau GmbH
- Industry: Heavy equipment
- Founded: 1948
- Headquarters: Ostfildern, Germany,
- Key people: Dr. Hermann Brüggemann (CEO)
- Products: Machinery
- Number of employees: 130
- Parent: Goldhofer AG
- Website: www.schopf-gse.com

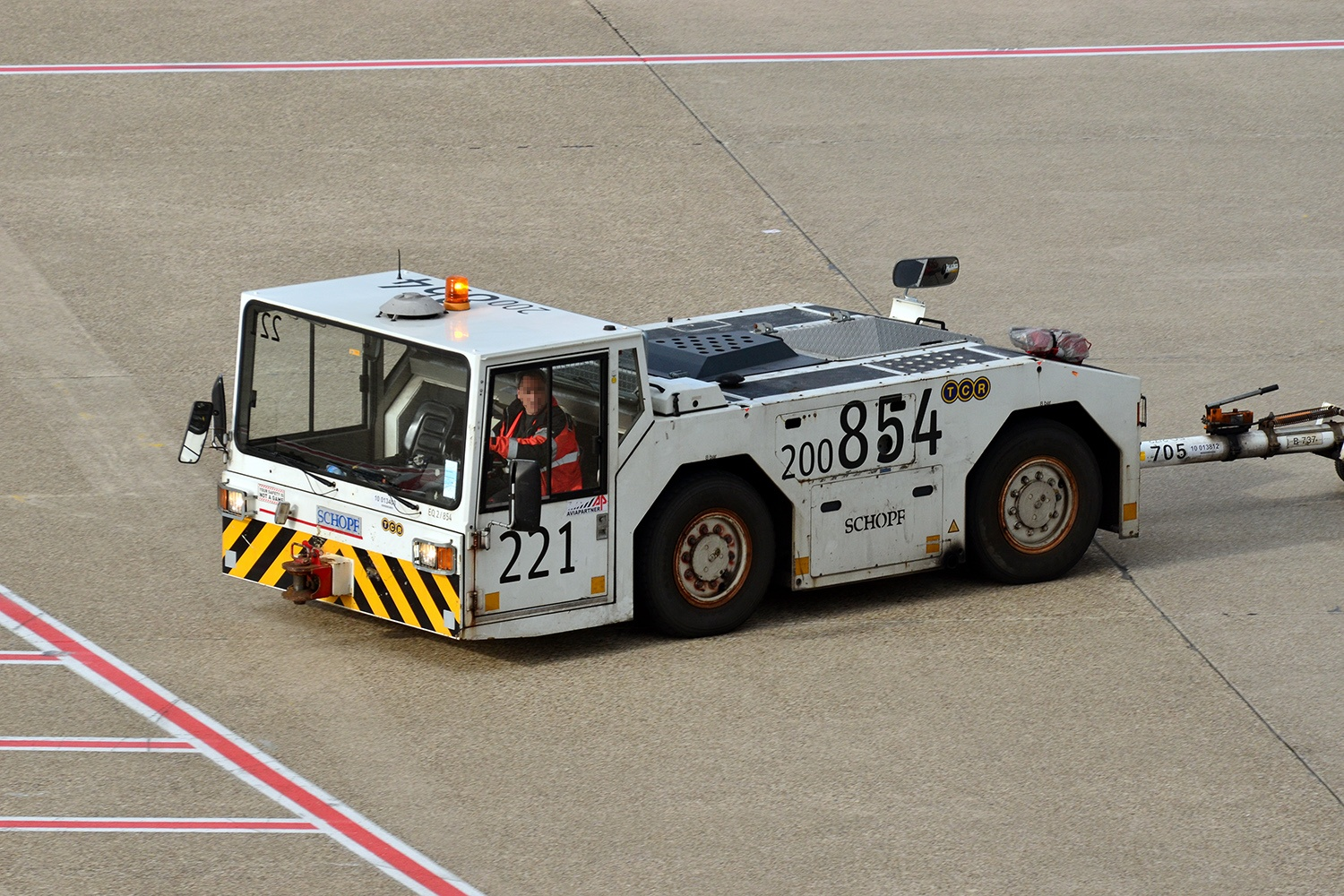
Schopf aircraft tow tractor

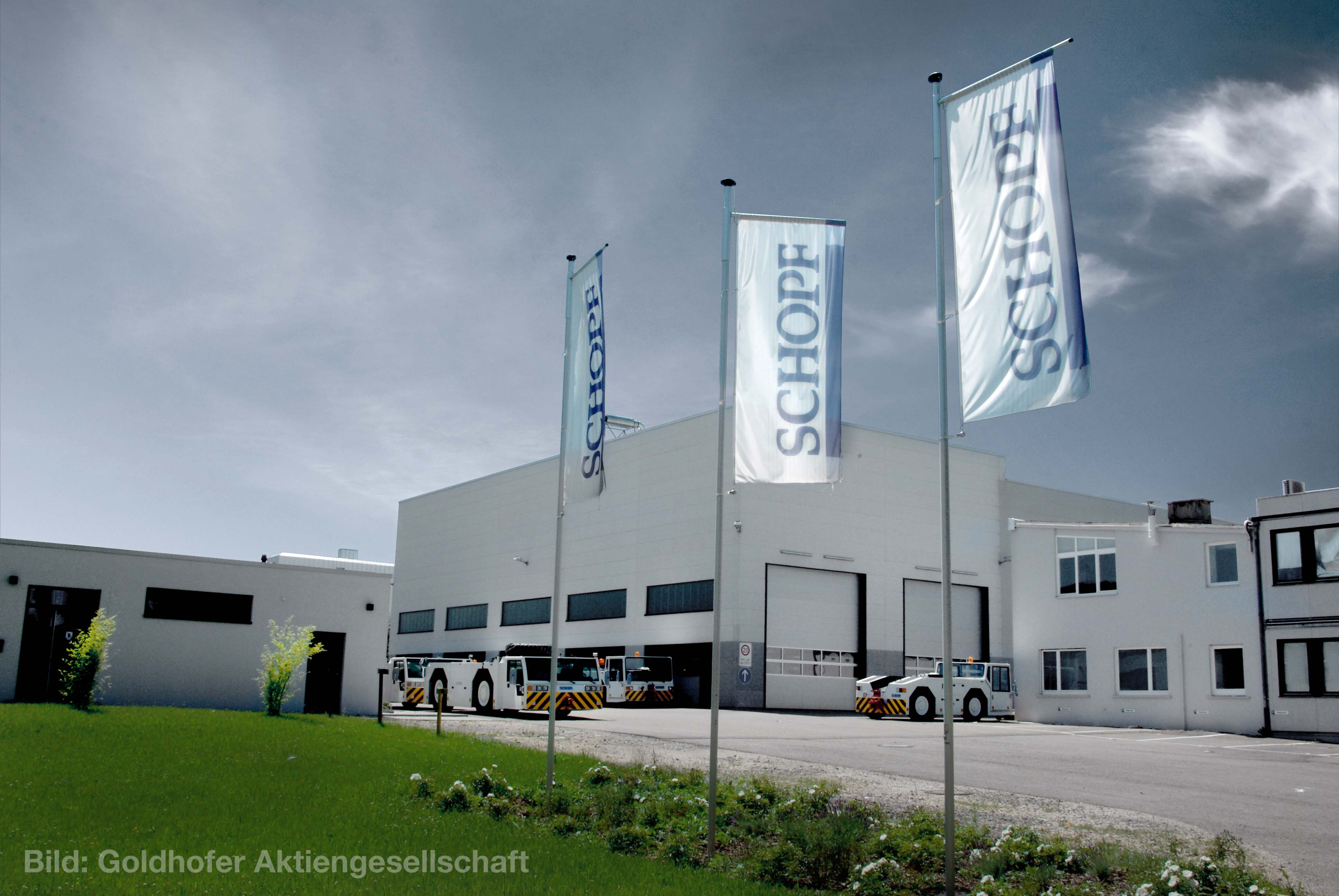
Schopf Maschinenbau GmbH in Ostfildern

SCHOPF Maschinenbau GmbH is a German company that produces specialist vehicles for the mining and aviation industries.

The company was founded in 1948 by Jörg Schopf, a mechanical engineer. It started out with manufacturing equipment for the mining industry. It soon expanded into the growing sector of aviation by manufacturing stair lifts, tow trucks and loading machinery. It is now considered the global market leader in this field.

Products supplied for both civil and military aviation include a range of tugs to handle aircraft in every weight range, the PowerPush remotely controlled pushback system, container / pallet loaders and passenger stairs. Supplying to NATO, major airlines, ground handling companies and airports around the globe, with deliveries to more than 130 countries.

SCHOPF’s range of mining vehicles comprises underground loaders suited for various materials and volumes, together with dump trucks produced in collaboration with an international partner.

Product conception, design, manufacture and sales are carried out by a team of 130 workers, all based at the factory in Ostfildern near Stuttgart in south western Germany.

The company's most powerful tow tractor, the F396P, is used to tow the world's largest cargo aircraft (Antonov An-225) and the Airbus A380, the largest passenger aircraft.

SCHOPF was acquired in 2013 by fellow German company Goldhofer.
