= Dennis Rapier =

Fire engine manufactured by Dennis Specialist Vehicles

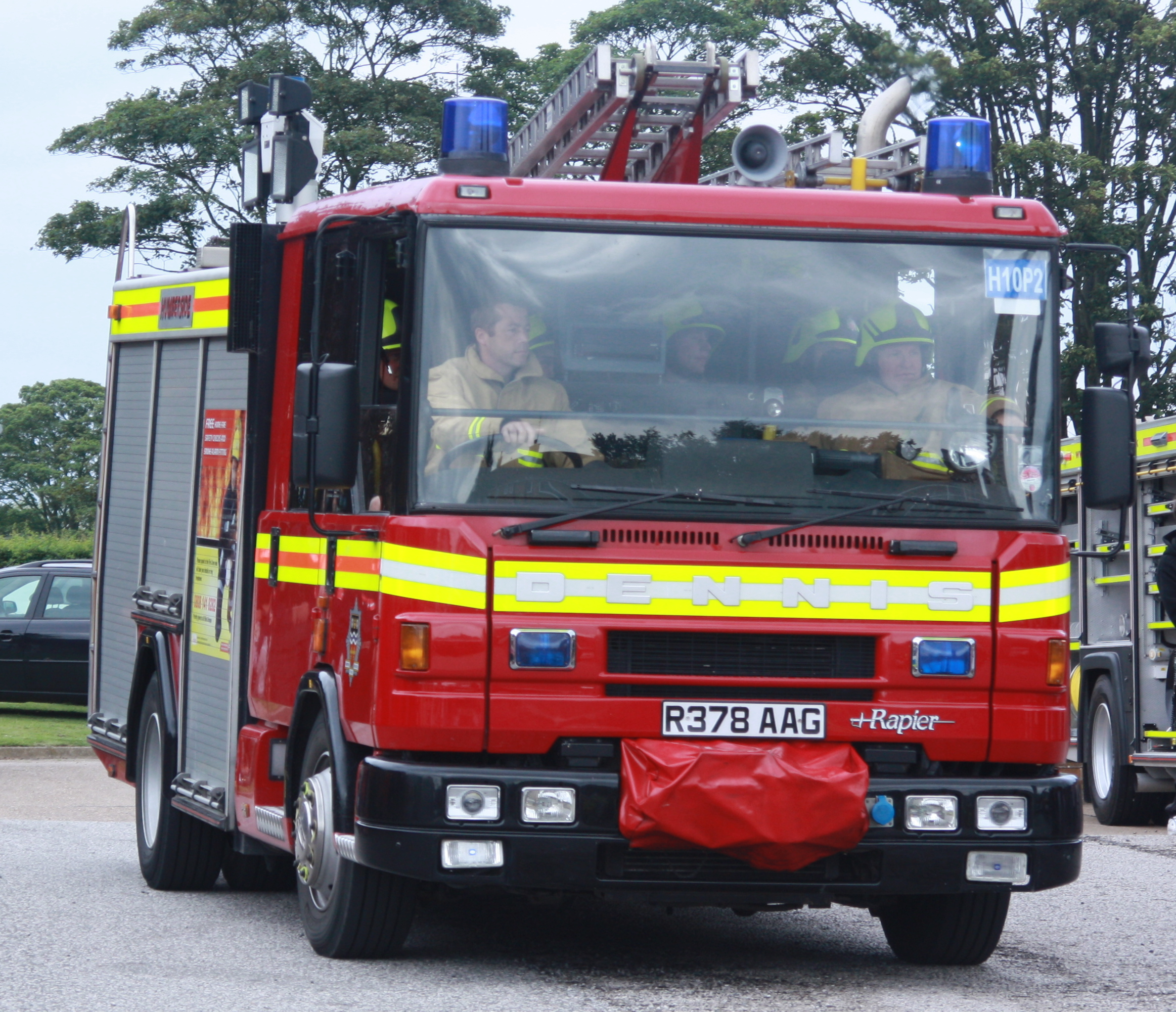
- Facelift Humberside Fire and Rescue Service Dennis Rapier in Bridlington in August 2011

Overview
- Type: Fire engine
- Manufacturer: Dennis Specialist Vehicles
- Production: 1991-2000s
- Assembly: Slyfield Industrial Estate, Guildford
- Designer: Capoco Design (1993 facelift)

Body and chassis
- Class: Large goods vehicle (N2, N3)
- Body style: Cab over engine
- Related: Dennis Sabre

Powertrain
- Engine: Cummins C260-21, turbocharged
- Transmission: Allison MCDR 'World Series' five-speed automatic

Dimensions
- Wheelbase: 3,600 mm (141.7 in)
- Length: 6,490 mm (255.5 in)
- Width: 2,350 mm (92.5 in)
- Height: 2,537 mm (99.9 in)
- Kerb weight: 1,400–3,460 kg (3,086–7,628 lb)

Chronology
- Predecessor: Dennis RS/SS series
- Successor: Dennis Dagger

The Dennis Rapier is a purpose-built fire engine produced by Dennis Specialist Vehicles of Guildford, Surrey, England from 1991 to the early 2000s.

== Design ==
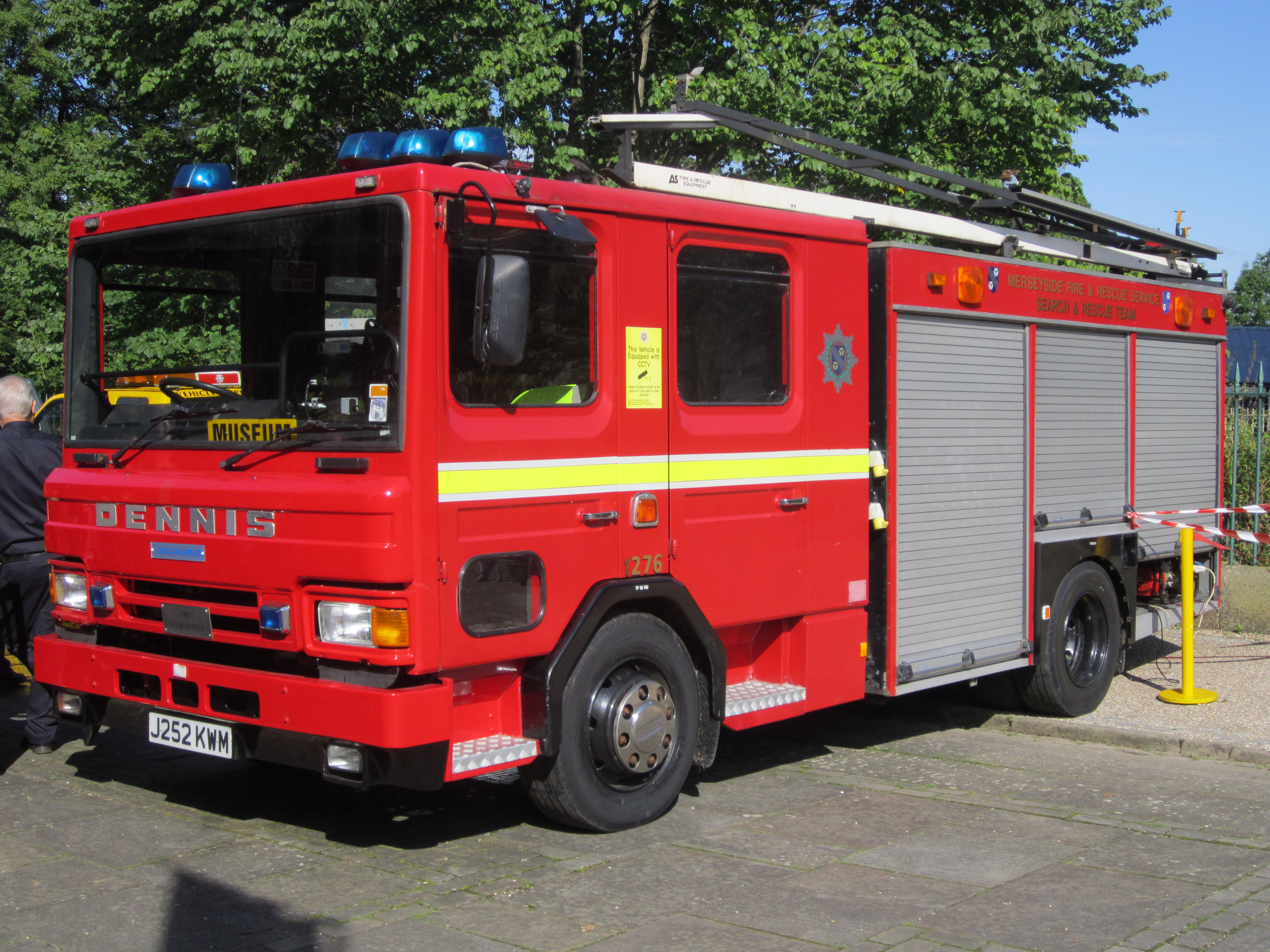
Preserved pre-facelift Merseyside Fire and Rescue Service Dennis Rapier

Following a prototype being exhibited to various fire brigades across the United Kingdom, the Dennis Rapier was launched into production in October 1991. The first Rapiers maintained some design elements of the RS/SS series they replaced, although featuring a redesigned front grille and rectangular headlights.

The Rapier received a facelift in 1993, designed by Capoco Design. The facelift mainly focused on the cab, giving it a modern and streamlined appearance and also allowing the cab to tilt to a total of 42 degrees. This facelift redesign saw Dennis and Capoco win a British Design Award in 1994.

As standard, the Rapier is powered by a Cummins C260-21 turbocharged six-cylinder engine and has an Allison MCDR five-speed automatic transmission. The Rapier's suspension uses "race car technology" such as a double-wishbone and coil springs with telescopic dampers, and the gearing allows a governed top speed of 75 miles per hour (121 km/h).

While the Rapier proved very popular with some brigades, others found it to be prohibitively expensive and limited in its equipment load capacity. The Dennis Sabre was launched in 1995 as a low-cost alternative with increased load capacity, which ultimately succeeded the Rapier and eventually became the last full-size fire engine produced by Dennis Specialist Vehicles. Production of the Dennis Rapier ceased in the early 2000s due to low sales and a parts shortage as a result of the discontinuation of the Renault Midliner, which sourced the Rapier's front suspension and brakes.

== Operators ==
The Humberside Fire Brigade were a major customer for the Dennis Rapier in the United Kingdom, with the brigade standardising on the appliance throughout its production into the late 1990s. Other operators of the Rapier in the United Kingdom included fire brigades in Merseyside, who took on a handful of pre-facelift examples, West Sussex, Kent, Shropshire and Nottinghamshire.

Following life as a demonstrator, a MkI Rapier (which had been retrofitted to have the 1993 facelift cab) was later delivered the Fire Service College in Moreton. This unit was sold to the New Zealand Fire Service in the early 2000s, making it not only one of the first Rapiers to be built, but also the first Rapier to serve in New Zealand. This appliance was later joined by a handful of imported MkI Rapiers that had also served in UK prior to their delivery to New Zealand, albeit these examples retained their origin pre-facelift cab design. As of 2023, all Rapiers in New Zealand have been retired, with the original Ex-Demonstrator/FSC Rapier now preserved.

Dennis Rapiers were also built for fire brigades in Belgium, the Netherlands and the Czech Republic.

Two Dennis Rapiers were delivered to Frankfurt and Erfurt, Germany in 2000 to evaluate whether the Rapier could function as a standard rescue pumper. The Rapier was met with a mixed reception by Frankfurt's fire crews in particular, and following a brief trial period, no further orders of the Rapier followed.

One Dennis Rapier was delivered to Hong Kong.
