= Dagr (disambiguation) =

Dagr is the personification of day in Norse mythology.

Dagr may also refer to:

- Defense Advanced GPS Receiver, a handheld device
- Direct Attack Guided Rocket, a weapons system
- "Dagr", a song by Wardruna from the 2009 album Runaljod – Gap Var Ginnunga
- Dragon Alliance of Gamers and Role-Players, the group that founded Dragon Con

== See also ==
- Dagger (disambiguation)
- Dagur (disambiguation)
