= Dagur (name) =

Dagur [ˈtaːɣʏr̥] is an Icelandic male given name.

== People ==
People with the name include:

- Dagur Arngrímsson (born 1987), Icelandic chess International Master
- Dagur Bergþóruson Eggertsson (born 1972), Icelandic politician
- Dagur Kár Jónsson (born 1995), Icelandic basketball player
- Dagur Kári (born 1973), Icelandic film director
- Dagur Sigurðarson (1937–1994), Icelandic poet
- Dagur Sigurðsson (born 1973), retired Icelandic handball player
- Steinar Dagur Adolfsson (born 1970), retired Icelandic football defender

=== Fictional characters ===
- Dagur the Deranged, an antagonist in the American animated television series DreamWorks Dragons

== See also ==
- Dagur (disambiguation)
- Dagger (disambiguation)
- Dagr, the personified day in Norse mythology
