= Dennis RS/SS series =

Range of Dennis fire engine chassis

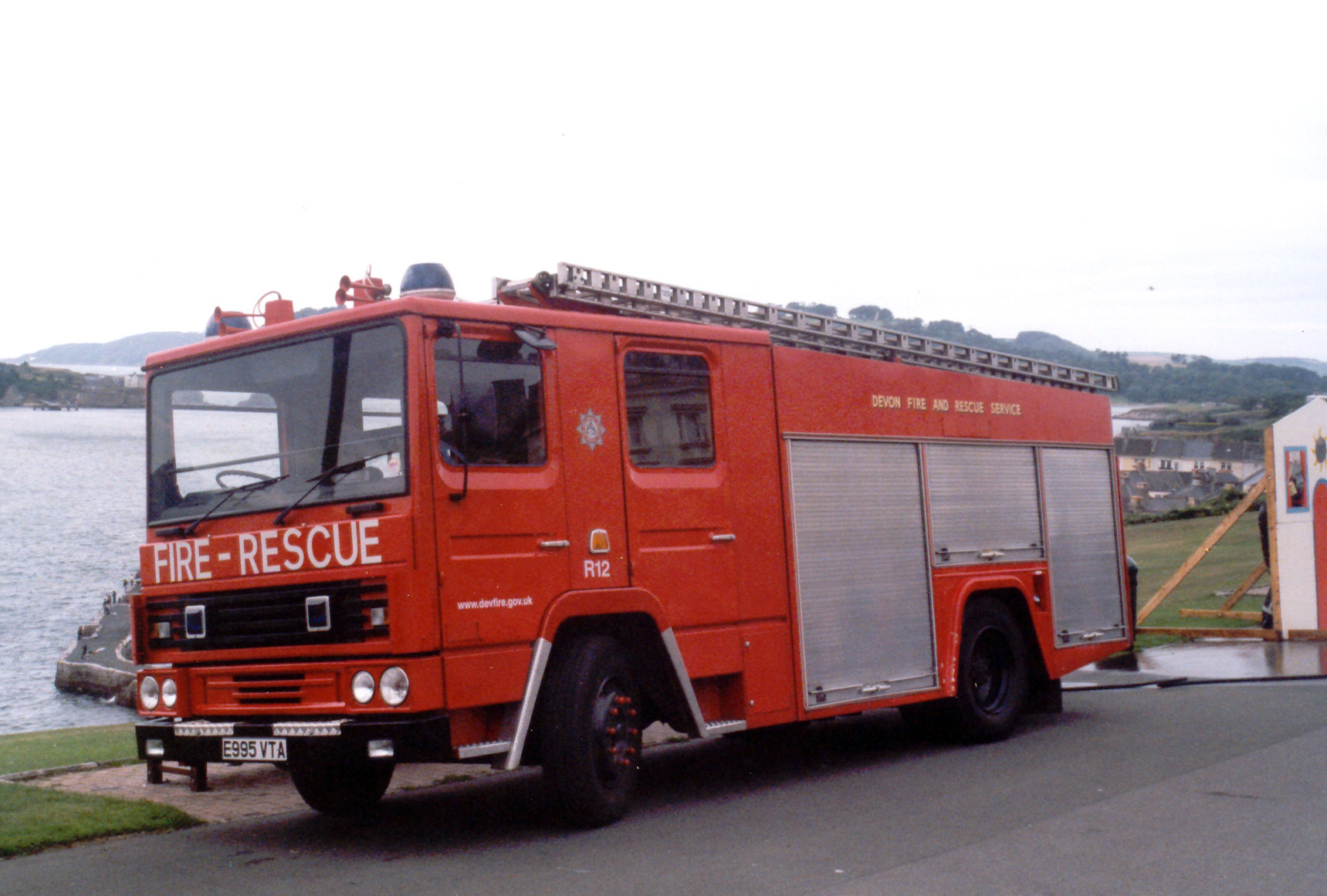
- A Devon Fire and Rescue Service Dennis RS

Overview
- Type: Fire engine
- Manufacturer: Hestair Dennis
- Production: 1978-1994
- Assembly: Woodbridge, Guildford
- Designer: Ogle Design

Body and chassis
- Body style: Cab over engine
- Related: Dennis DS series; Dennis DF series; Dennis Delta

Powertrain
- Engine: Perkins V8-540; Perkins TV8-540; Perkins V8-640; Perkins T6.354.4; Perkins Phaser; Cummins 6CT; Cummins 6CTA
- Transmission: Turner T5-400 five-speed manual; ZF S6-65 manual; Allison MT643 automatic; ZF 5HP500 automatic

Dimensions
- Wheelbase: 3,800 mm (149.6 in)
- Length: 7,334 mm (288.7 in)
- Width: 2,286 mm (90.0 in)
- Height: 3,072 mm (120.9 in)
- Kerb weight: 11,700 kg (25,794 lb)

Chronology
- Successor: Dennis Rapier; Dennis Sabre

The Dennis RS/SS series was a range of fire engine chassis built by Hestair Dennis (later Dennis Specialist Vehicles), produced from 1978 until the early 1990s.

== Features ==
Internally codenamed Retained, Steel, the Dennis RS series was first launched in 1979, initially not offered with a tilting cab due to a belief that few fire stations at the time could accommodate a tilting cab. A lower-cost alternative named the Standard Specification, or SS series, was launched shortly afterwards, however at the request of the London Fire Brigade, this would be fitted with a tilting front cab as standard to improve ease of maintenance. The all-steel cab, designed by Ogle Design, replaced the older fibreglass and wood construction of the previous appliances it succeeded, such as the Dennis D and Dennis R, increasing the strength of the cab overall in the event of a collision.

The first of the Dennis RS/SS fire appliances were fitted with Perkins V8 diesel engines, either the V8-540 or the V8-640, with or without turbochargers; by 1987, the RS and SS could be specified with Cummins C-series engines. Early appliances were bodied in-house by Dennis at their Woodbridge factory, but when in-house fire engine bodying was discontinued in 1985, the bodying of the Dennis RS/SS series and derivative products was outsourced to other coachbuilders, primarily to Carmichael Fire. The RS could also be fitted with a variety of bodies by other coachbuilders including HCB Angus, Fulton Wylie and Saxon Specialist Vehicles.

Over 1,750 Dennis RS/SS fire engines would be produced, being sold to nearly all fire brigades across the United Kingdom as well as being exported to various fire brigades worldwide. As the appliances aged, RS and SS series appliances were known to suffer from corrosion particularly around the cab doors, nicknamed "Dennis Disease" by mechanics.

== Variants ==
- RS130/SS130 - Perkins V8-540 engine with Turner T5.400 manual gearbox
- RS131/SS131 - Perkins V8-540 engine with Allison MT643 automatic gearbox
- RS132/SS132 - Perkins V8-540 engine with ZF S6.65 manual gearbox
- RS133/SS133 - Perkins V8-640 engine with Allison MT643 automatic gearbox
- RS134/SS134 - Perkins TV8-540 engine with ZF S6.65 manual gearbox
- RS135/SS135 - Perkins TV8-540 engine with Allison MT643 automatic gearbox
- RS137/SS137 - Perkins V8-540 engine with Allison MT643 automatic gearbox

All chassis came with a choice of a 500gpm or 1,000gpm two-stage Godiva fire pump, depending on application, and a 400 imperial gallons (1,800 L) emergency water tank.

== Significant operators ==
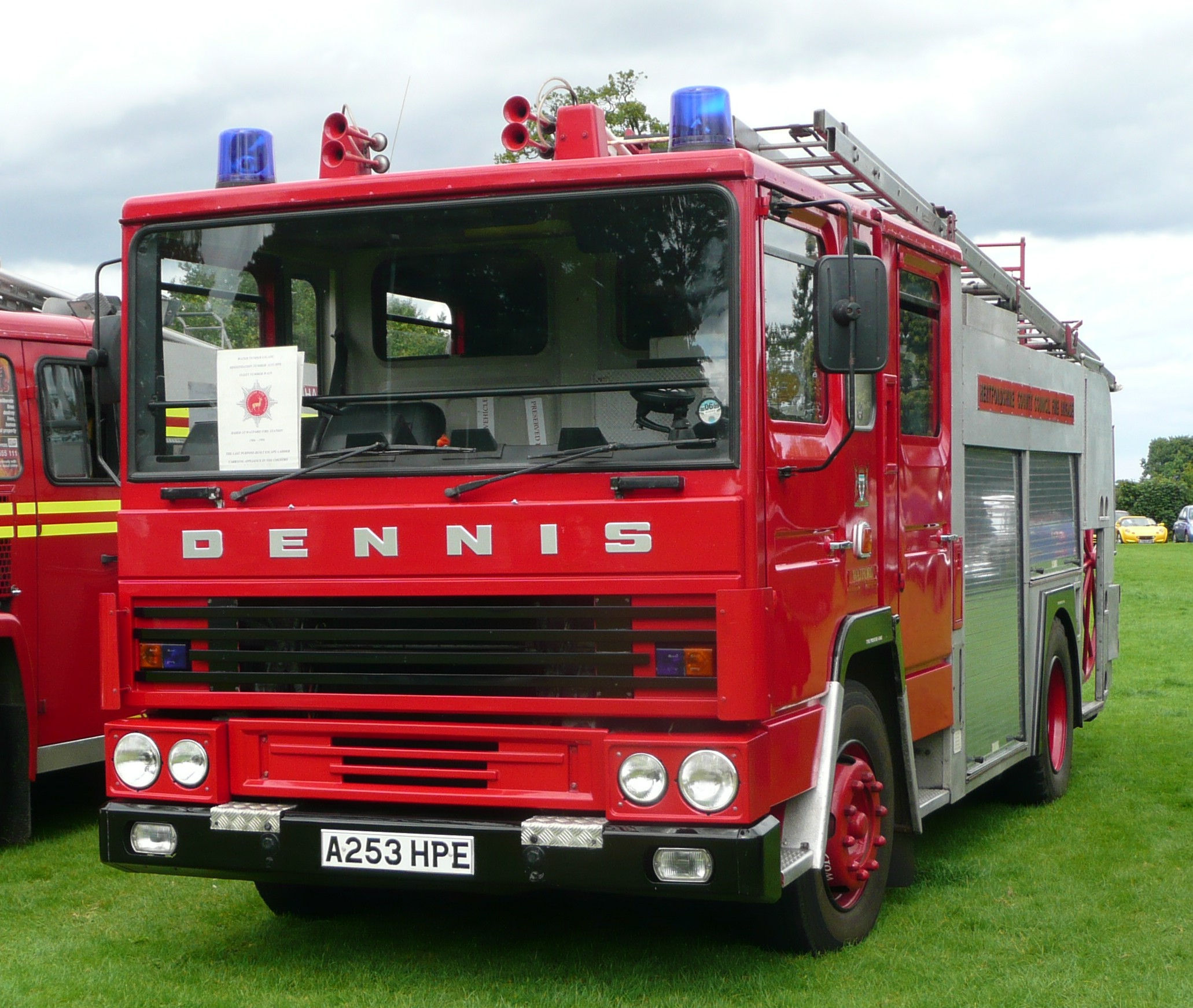
A preserved Hertfordshire Fire and Rescue Service Dennis SS pump escape

=== United Kingdom ===
- London Fire Brigade - Still operating 107 SS137s by 1995
- Cheshire Fire and Rescue Service
- Essex County Fire and Rescue Service
- Greater Manchester Fire and Rescue Service
- Hampshire Fire and Rescue Service
- Hertfordshire Fire and Rescue Service
- Humberside Fire and Rescue Service
- Kent Fire and Rescue Service
- Merseyside Fire and Rescue Service
- Northern Ireland Fire Brigade
- Staffordshire Fire and Rescue Service
- West Midlands Fire Service
- West Yorkshire Fire and Rescue Service

=== Republic of Ireland ===
- Dublin Fire Brigade
- Civil Defence Ireland

=== Elsewhere ===
- Hong Kong Fire Services Department
- Singapore Fire Service
- Romania-former UK vehicles, as donations
- Johannesburg Fire and Rescue
- City of Cape Town
- East London Fire Brigade
- City of Port Elizabeth (now Nelson Mandela Metropolitan Municipality)
