= Dennis DF series =

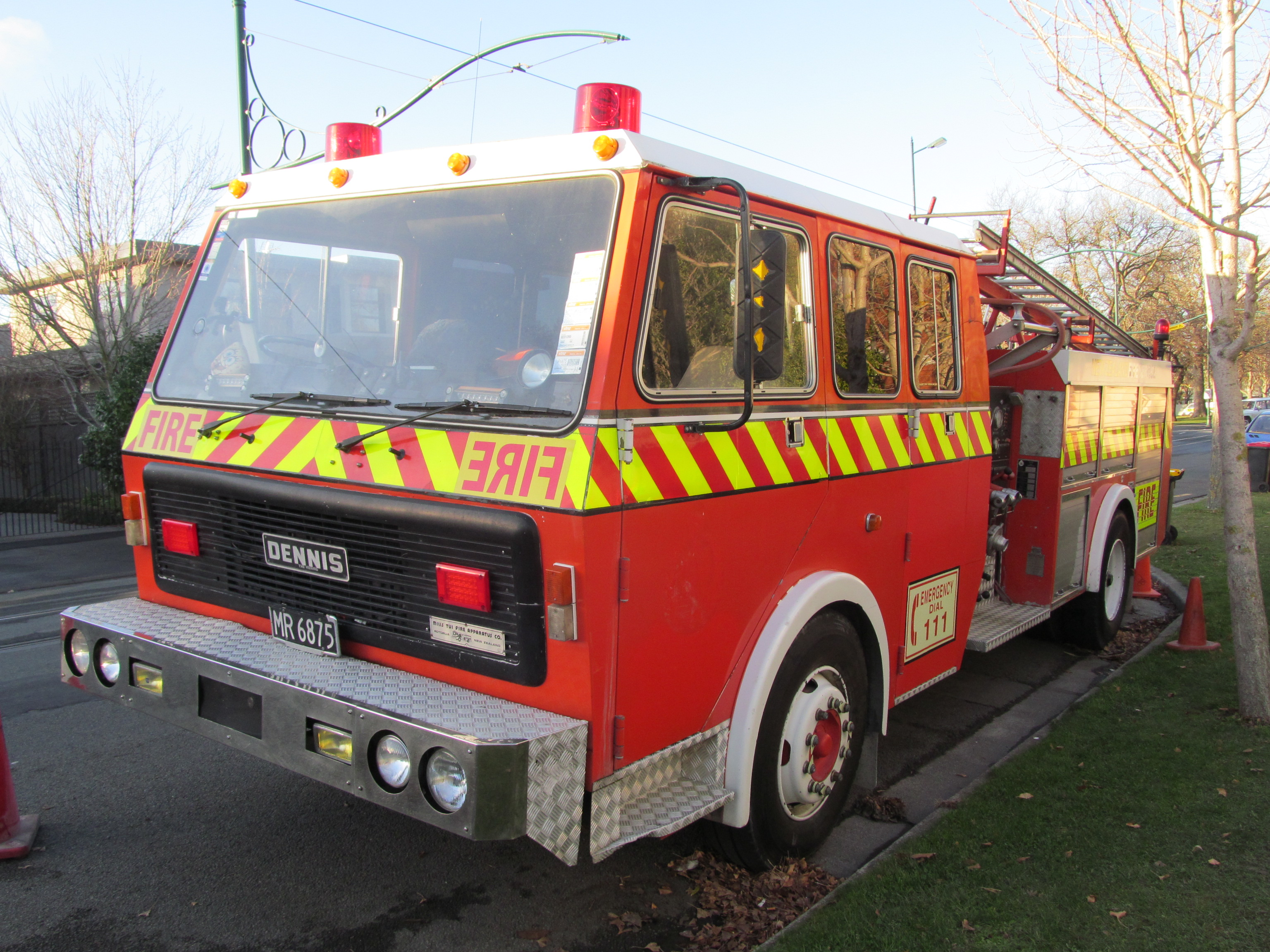
- A Mills-Tui bodied Dennis DF DK of the New Zealand Fire Service

Overview
- Type: Fire engine
- Manufacturer: Hestair Dennis
- Production: 1979-early 1990s
- Assembly: Woodbridge, Guildford
- Designer: Ogle Design

Body and chassis
- Body style: Cab over engine
- Related: Dennis RS/SS series; Dennis Delta

Powertrain
- Engine: Perkins V8-540; Perkins TV8-540; Perkins V8-640; Perkins T6.354.4; Perkins Phaser; Cummins 6CT; Cummins 6CTA
- Transmission: Turner T5-400 five-speed manual; ZF S6-65 manual; Allison MT643 automatic; ZF 5HP500 automatic

Dimensions
- Wheelbase: 3,810–5,334 mm (150.0–210.0 in)
- Length: 6,136 mm (241.6 in)
- Width: 2,472 mm (97.3 in)
- Height: 2,640 mm (103.9 in)
- Kerb weight: 16,260 kg (35,847 lb)

The Dennis DF series is a range of heavy-duty fire engine chassis produced by Hestair Dennis (later Dennis Specialist Vehicles) from 1979 to the early 1990s. Based on the Dennis RS/SS series, the DF has a 16,260 kg (35,850 lb) gross vehicle weight, and was produced primarily as a base for turntable ladder appliances or tanker units carrying either foam or water.

The DF could be offered in 'Firebird' or 'Waterbird' specification. The 'Firebird' variant could carry up to 1,000 imp gal (4,500 L; 1,200 US gal) of water, while the 'Waterbird' variant could carry 1,800 imp gal (8,200 L; 2,200 US gal) of water.

== Operators ==
Turntable ladder appliances on the Dennis DF chassis were sold to a number of fire brigades in the United Kingdom, including the Tyne and Wear Metropolitan Fire Brigade.

The DF was also sold to fire brigades in Hong Kong, the Middle East and Kenya. DF135s were also exported to New Zealand for use as pump tenders in the New Zealand Fire Service, with some being built with Mills-Tui bodywork.

== See also ==
- Dennis RS/SS series
