= Dennis Sabre =

Fire engine manufactured by Dennis Specialist Vehicles

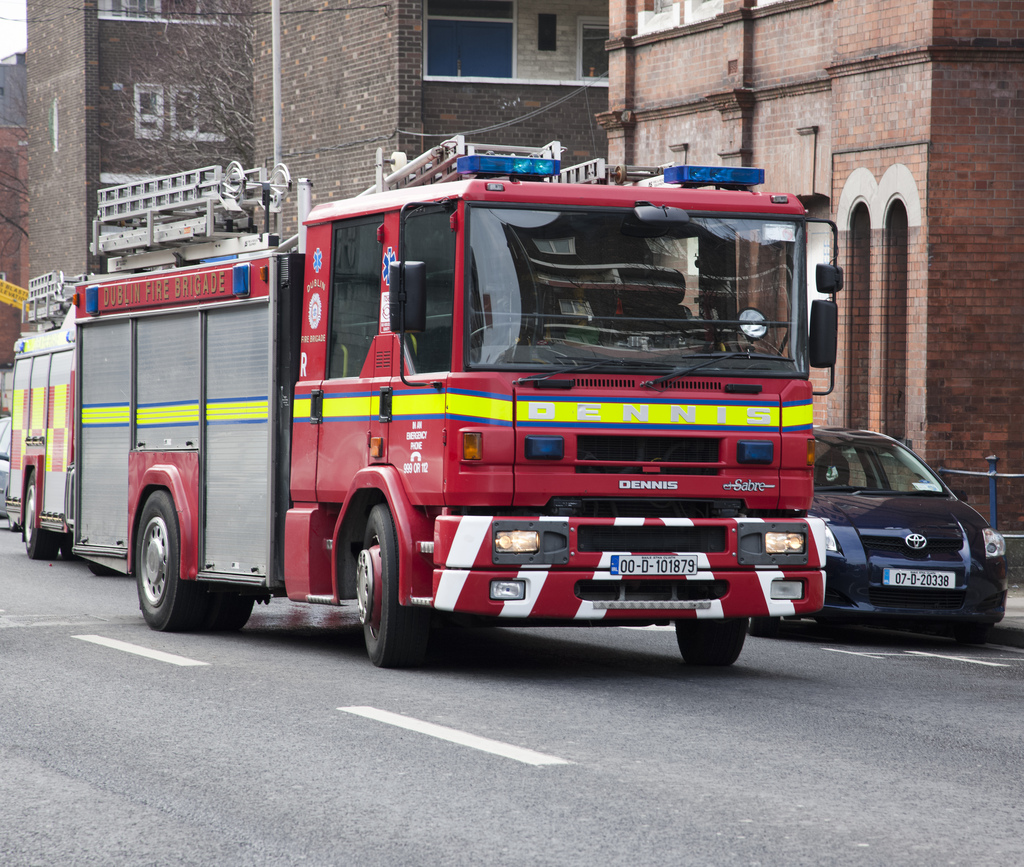
- A Dennis Sabre fire engine in Dublin

Overview
- Type: Fire engine
- Manufacturer: Dennis Specialist Vehicles
- Production: 1995-2007
- Assembly: Slyfield Industrial Estate, Guildford
- Designer: Capoco Design

Body and chassis
- Class: Large goods vehicle (N2, N3)
- Body style: Cab over engine
- Related: Dennis Rapier, Dennis Dagger

Powertrain
- Engine: Cummins C260 Euro 2, turbocharged
- Transmission: Allison MD 'World Series' five-speed automatic

Dimensions
- Wheelbase: 3,800 mm (149.6 in)
- Length: STD: 2,919 mm (114.9 in) ML: 3,109 mm (122.4 in) XL: 3,309 mm (130.3 in)
- Width: 2,762 mm (108.7 in)
- Height: 2,714 mm (106.9 in)
- Kerb weight: 1,835–4,105 kg (4,045–9,050 lb)

Chronology
- Predecessor: Dennis RS/SS series

The Dennis Sabre is a purpose-built fire engine produced by Dennis Specialist Vehicles of Guildford, Surrey, England from 1995 to 2007. It was the last full-size fire appliance produced by the company before its closure in 2007.

== Features ==
Built as a low-cost alternative to the Dennis Rapier with increased equipment load capacity, the Sabre was available in three sizes: Sabre, Sabre ML, Sabre XL, with most of the coachbuilding on these chassis being undertaken by John Dennis Coachbuilders of Guildford, England. Over the Sabre's thirteen year production run it underwent several subtle styling changes, mainly to the grille, and later shared styling similarities with the compact Dennis Dagger. Production ceased in 2007 with the closure of Dennis Specialist Vehicles.

Like the Rapier, the Sabre is powered by a Cummins C Series turbocharged six-cylinder diesel engine and has an Allison MD five-speed automatic transmission. It also uses a double-wishbone suspension with semi-elliptical multileaf and coil springs with telescopic dampers, and the gearing allows a governed top speed of 72 miles per hour (116 km/h). The Sabre holds 1,800 L (400 imp gal; 480 US gal) of water and seats six people in a stainless steel tilting cab.

Operators of the Dennis Sabre include fire brigades in the West Midlands and North East England, Nottinghamshire, Hereford and Worcester, the city of Dublin and the Hong Kong Fire Services Department. The Dublin Fire Brigade are unique in ordering the only Sabre turntable ladders on the Sabre HD (Heavy Duty) chassis, while the Sabre HD was also popular with the Singapore Civil Defence Force as a conventional fire engine. Sabres were also sold to fire brigades in the Czech Republic, Slovakia, South Africa and the Netherlands.

== Gallery ==
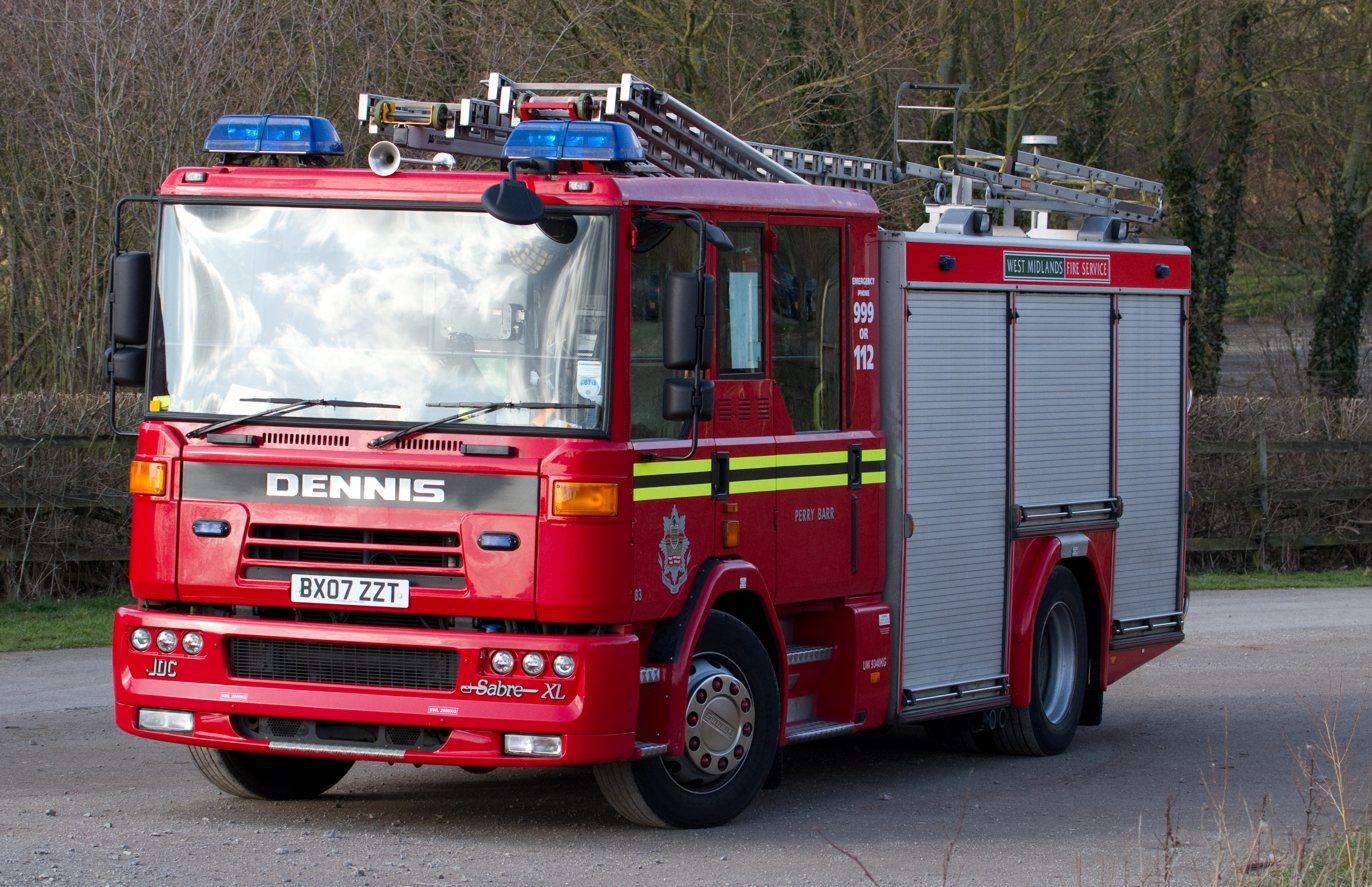
A facelifted West Midlands Fire Service Dennis Sabre

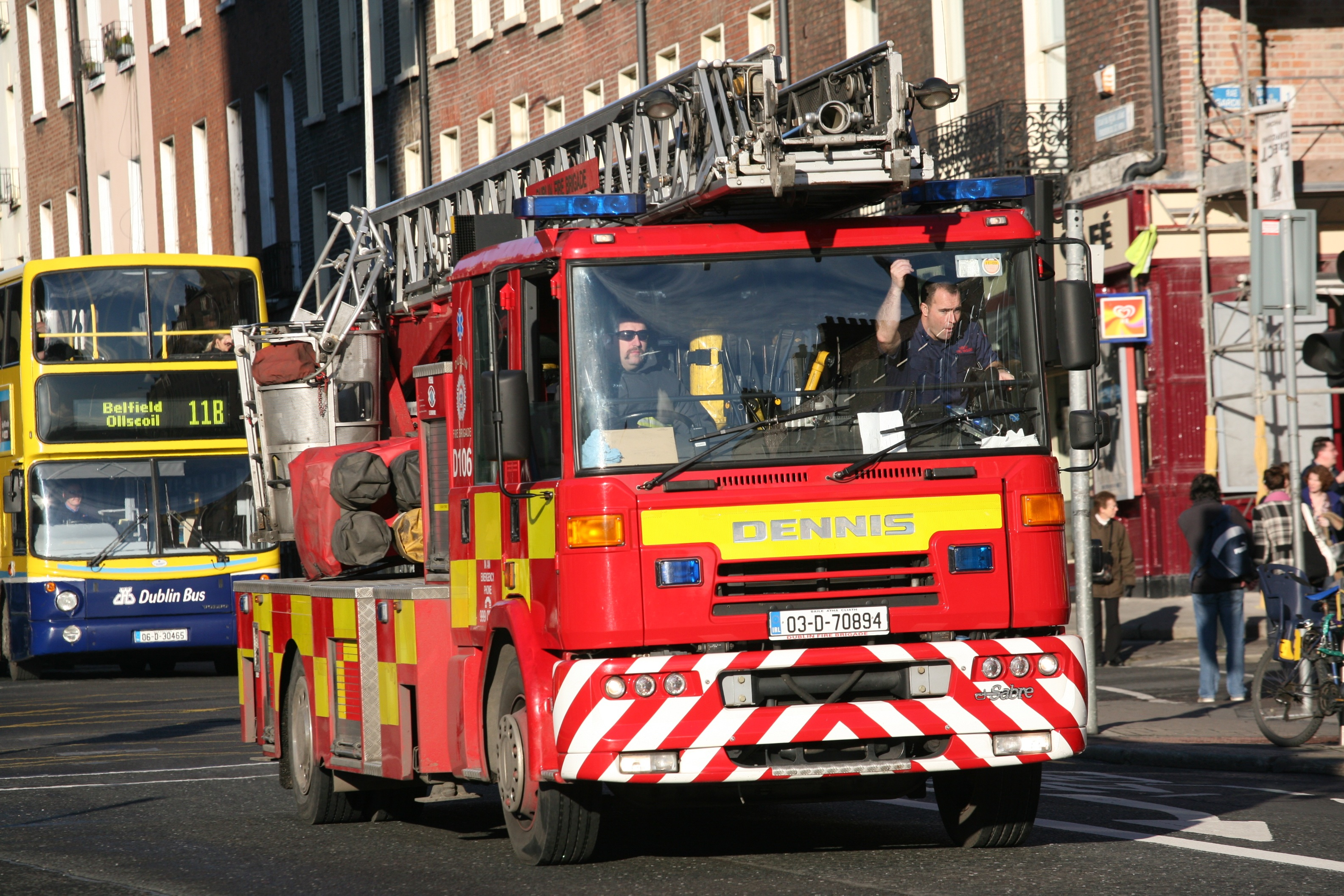
One of the Dublin Fire Brigade's unique Dennis Sabre HD (Heavy Duty) turntable ladders

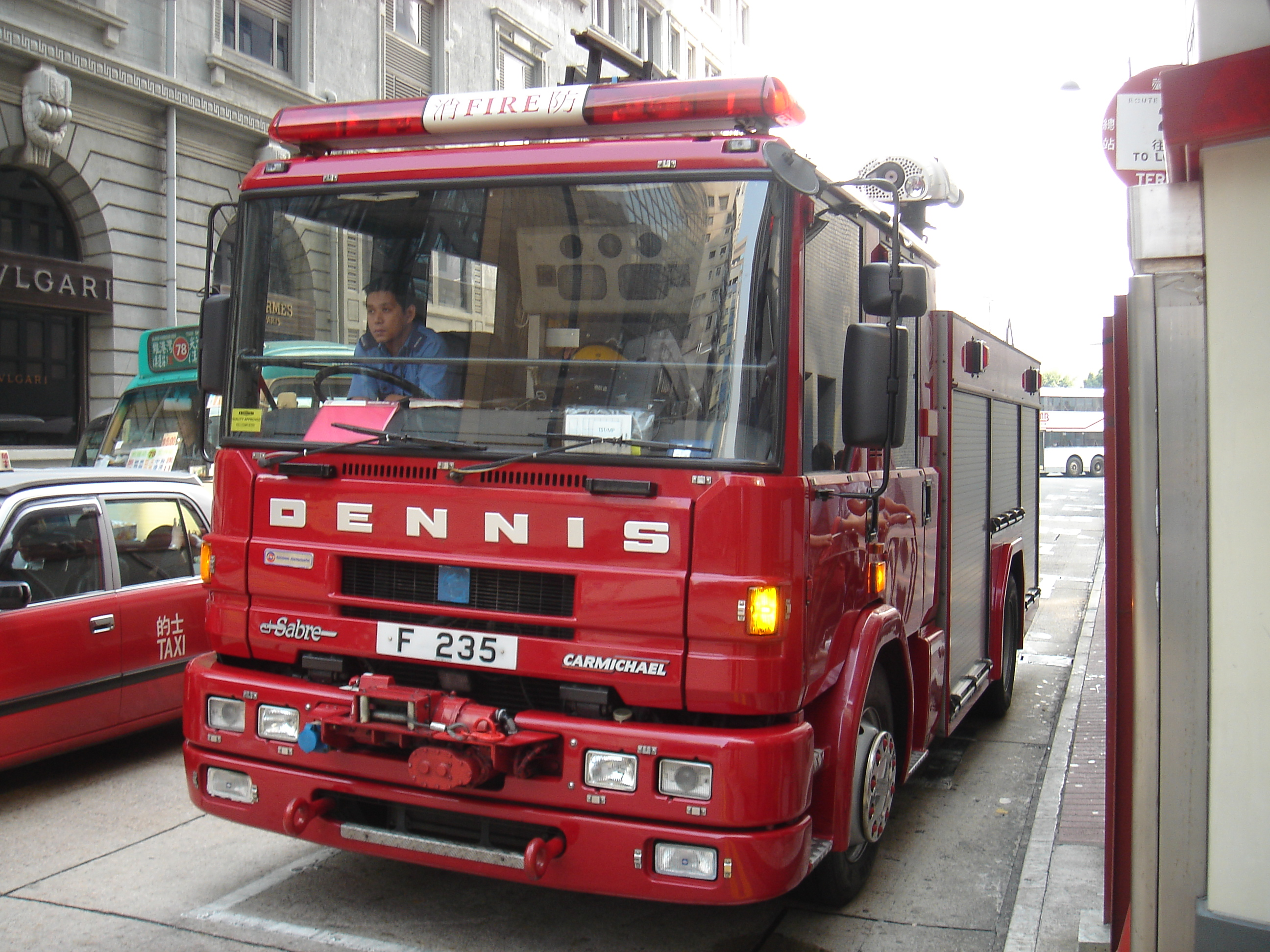
A Hong Kong Fire Services Department Dennis Sabre in Kowloon
