= The Dagger =

The Dagger may refer to:

- The Dagger (1972 film), an Iranian film
- The Dagger (1999 film), a Yugoslav film
- "The Dagger", a 2009 song by Nebula from Heavy Psych
- "The Dagger", a 2005 song by Roadrunner United
- "The Dagger", a 2025 American football play by the Philadelphia Eagles in Super Bowl LIX

== See also ==
- Dagger (disambiguation)
