= Double dagger (disambiguation) =

A double dagger ‡ is a typographical mark used to indicate a footnote.

Double dagger may also refer to:

- Double Dagger (band), an American post-punk band
  - Double Dagger (album), the band's 2003 debut album
- Double Dagger Studio, the developers of the video game Little Kitty, Big City

== See also ==
- Dagger (disambiguation)
- Half sharp, a musical notation that resembles a double dagger mark
- Double Cross (disambiguation)
