= Dagur =

Dagur may refer to:

- Daur people, or dagur, an ethnic group in northeastern China
  - Dagur language
- Dagur (name), an Icelandic male given name
- Dagur, a fictional character in TV series DreamWorks Dragons
- Dagur, a former Icelandic newspaper which merged with Tíminn in 1996 to form Dagur-Tíminn

== See also ==
- Dagr, the personification of day in Norse mythology
- Dagger (disambiguation)
- Mongol Daguur, a steppe and wetland region in Mongolia
