= Dennis DS series =

Compact Dennis fire engine

Dennis DS
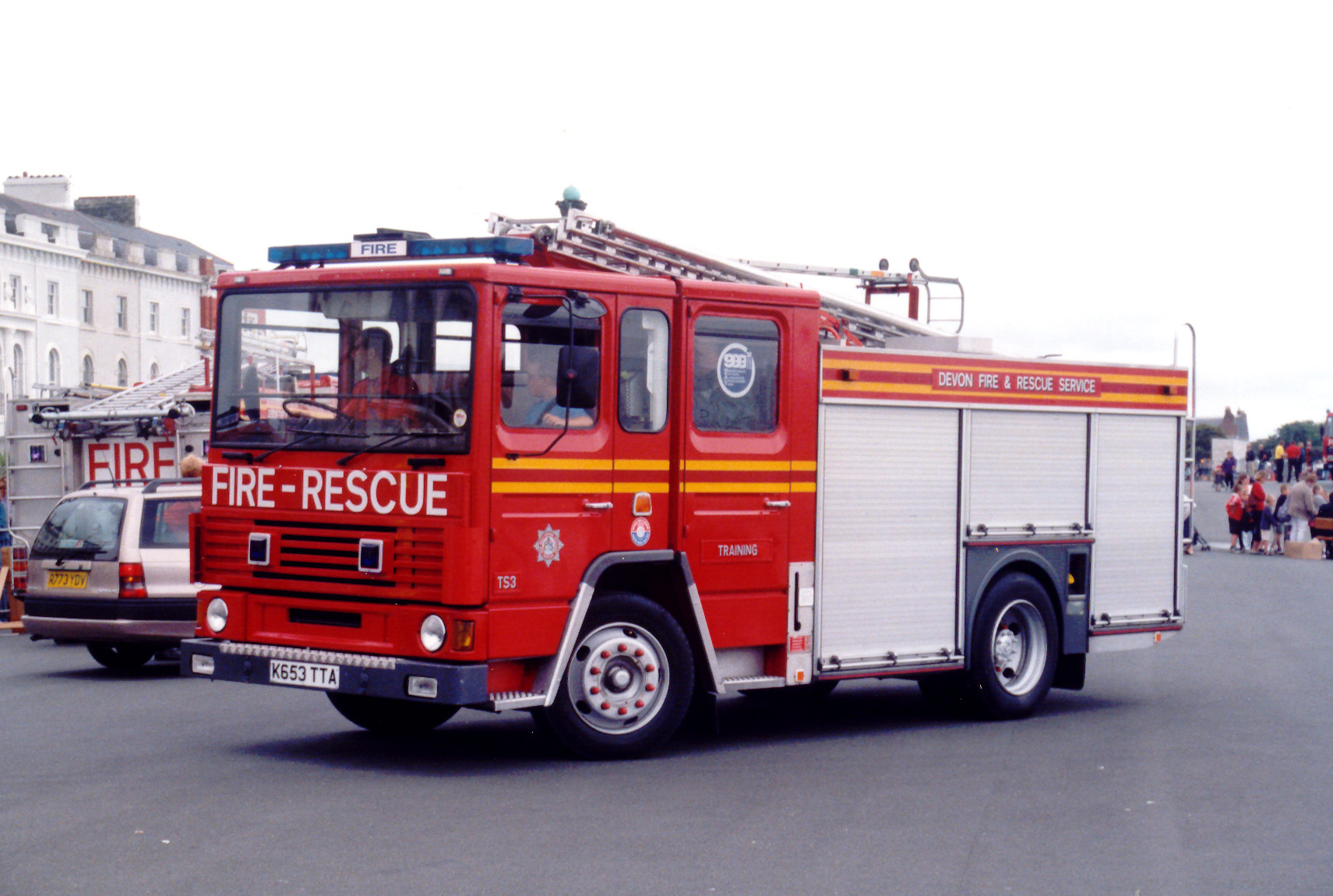
- A Dennis DS of the Devon Fire and Rescue Service

Overview
- Type: Fire engine
- Manufacturer: Hestair Dennis
- Production: 1979-early 1990s
- Assembly: Woodbridge, Guildford
- Designer: Ogle Design

Body and chassis
- Body style: Cab over engine
- Related: Dennis RS/SS series; Dennis Delta

Powertrain
- Engine: Perkins V8-540; Perkins TV8-540; Perkins V8-640; Perkins T6.354.4; Perkins Phaser; Cummins 6CT; Cummins 6CTA
- Transmission: Turner T5-400 five-speed manual; ZF S6-65 manual; Allison MT643 automatic; ZF 5HP500 automatic

Dimensions
- Wheelbase: 3,280 mm (129.1 in)
- Length: 6,136 mm (241.6 in)
- Width: 2,134 mm (84.0 in)
- Height: 2,565 mm (101.0 in)
- Kerb weight: 9,900–4,105 kg (21,826–9,050 lb)

Chronology
- Successor: Dennis Dagger

The Dennis DS series was a compact fire engine with a tilting cab built by Dennis Specialist Vehicles from 1979 to the early 1990s. It was almost visually and mechanically identical in construction to the Dennis RS/SS series with the exception of a shorter wheelbase, aimed at fire brigades which may operate in tight rural areas unsuitable for full-size fire engines.

Operators of the Dennis DS include the Devon, Cheshire, Hertfordshire and Durham County fire brigades, as well as the Dublin Fire Brigade. Eight were built for the North Yorkshire and Hampshire fire brigades between 1987 and 1989 with HCB Angus bodies.

== See also ==
- Dennis RS/SS series, the DS's full-size counterparts
