= Hong Kong Fire Services Department =

Hong Kong emergency services agency

- 香港消防處
- Address: Hong Kong Fire Services Headquarters Building, 1 Hong Chong Road, Tsim Sha Tsui East, West Kowloon, Hong Kong

Agency overview
- Established: 9 May 1868; 158 years ago
- Employees: 11,476 (2024)
- Annual budget: 8,634 million HKD (2024)
- Director of Fire Services: Andy Yeung Yan-kin
- EMS level: ALS

Facilities and equipment
- Stations: 84 (2024)
- Engines: 713 (2023)
- Ambulances: 536 (2023)
- Fireboats: 12
- Rescue boats: 3 diving 2 command

Website
- Official Page

Hong Kong Fire Services Department
- Traditional Chinese: 消防處
- Simplified Chinese: 消防处
Transcriptions
Standard Mandarin
- Hanyu Pinyin: Xiāofángchù
Yue: Cantonese
- Yale Romanization: Sīufòhng Chyu
- Jyutping: Siu1fong4 Cyu3
- IPA: [siw˥.fɔŋ˩ tsʰy˧]

The Hong Kong Fire Services Department is an emergency service responsible for firefighting and rescue on land and sea. It also provides an emergency ambulance service for the sick and the injured and gives fire protection advice to the public. It is under the Secretary for Security who heads the Security Bureau.

== History ==
Flag of Fire Services Department before 1997. Note the use of the British Crown

Badge of Fire Services Department before 1997

The history of the Hong Kong Fire Service began in the Government Gazette dated 9 May 1868. Charles May became the first Superintendent of the Fire Brigade. At the time, the Fire Department was part of the Hong Kong Police Force. It had a total strength of 62 with a supplement of 100 Chinese volunteers. The fire department expanded to 140 members during the 1920s.

During the Japanese Occupation during World War II, the service was disbanded. Its two fire engines were exported to Tokyo to become part of the Imperial Palace Fire Unit, and were returned after the war.

Hong Kong's ambulance service is part of the Fire Department. Previously, emergency ambulance service was provided by the Fire Service while non-emergency ambulance service was handled by the Medical Corps. In 1950, the Auxiliary Fire Service Unit was created to establish the Hong Kong Auxiliary Fire Brigade to provide additional manpower to regular fire brigade members under the Essential Services (Auxiliary Fire Service) Corps Regulations.

In 1953, all Medical Corps vehicles and crew were transferred to the Fire Service. Thus, leading to the creation to the present Ambulance Command. Over the past 70 years it has grown to accommodate 42 ambulance depots, 240 ambulances, 35 motorcycles and 2,350 uniformed staff.

== Overview ==
The department has 11,476 (10,690 uniformed and 786 civilian) members as of 2024. It is organised into nine commands and one support branch. Operations are split into four geographic commands, an Ambulance Command and a Operational Support Command. These are supported by the Licensing and Certification Command, Fire Safety Command and the Corporate Strategy Command as well as an Administration Branch. Commanding the department is the Director of Fire Services.

== Organisational structure ==
=== Fire and special services ===
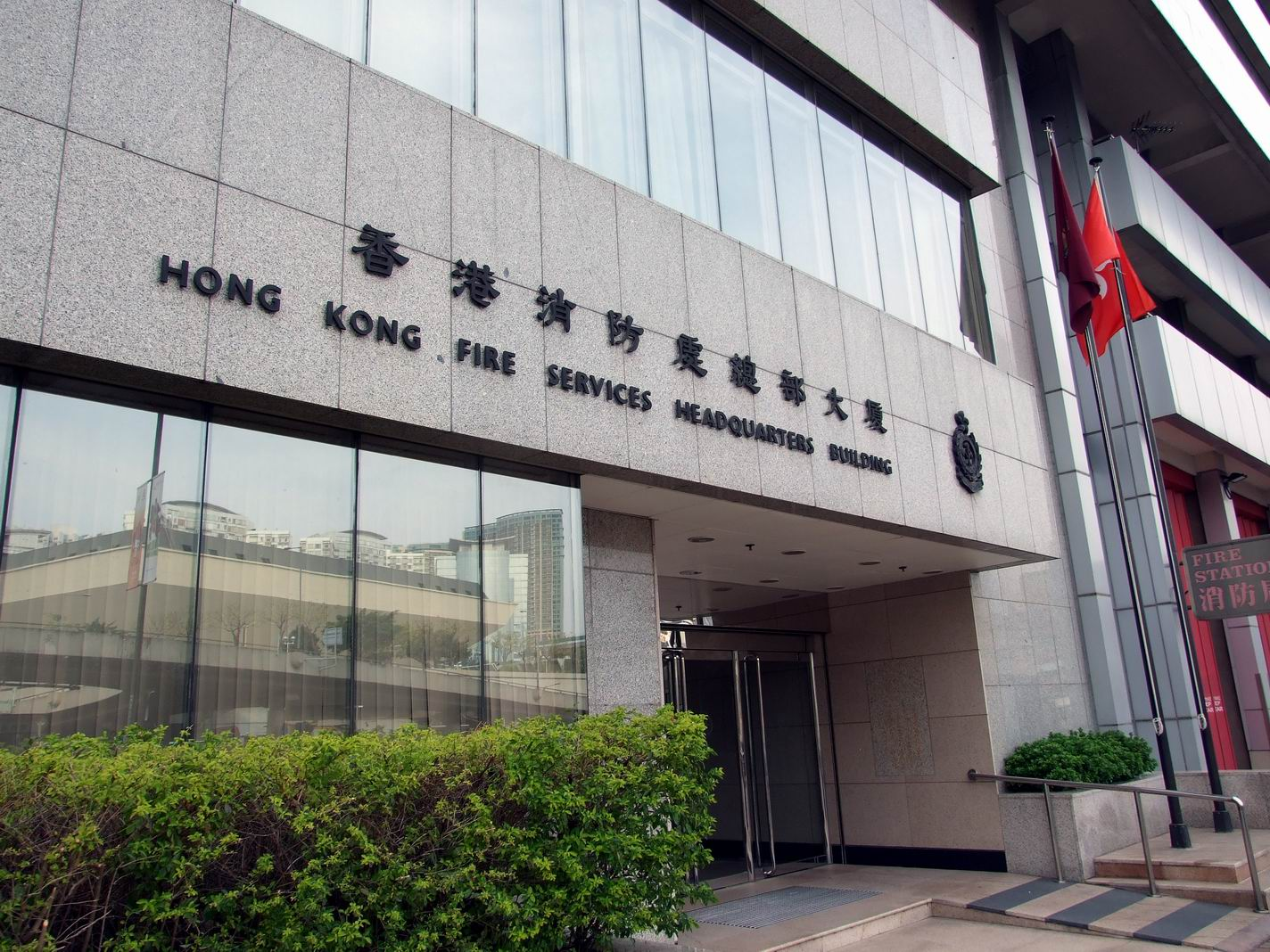
Fire Services Headquarters Building (香港消防處總部大樓)

Firefighting, rescue and other emergency services are undertaken by the three operational commands － Hong Kong (including marine and off-shore islands), Kowloon and the New Territories. There are 84 fire stations across Hong Kong's three operational commands. In 2004, they responded to 35,092 fire calls and 20,059 special service calls. This had risen to 37,828 fire calls and 39,320 special service calls in 2024. Careless handling or disposal of cigarette butts, matches and candles remained the major causes of fires, followed by incidents involving the preparation of food and electrical faults. Fires claimed nine lives and left 451 injured in 2004. Of the injured, 46 were Fire Services personnel. Special service calls cover a wide range of incidents, including traffic and industrial accidents, gas leakages, landslides, flooding, house collapses, suicide attempts and malfunctioning lifts. In 2004, 717 people died and 1,995 others were injured in such incidents. One of the dead and 16 of the injured were Fire Services personnel. The department has 835 operational appliances and vehicles fitted with up-to-date fire-fighting and rescue equipment. The first-line appliances, basically comprising major pumps, hydraulic platforms, light rescue units and turntable ladders/snorkels, are supported where necessary by other special appliances/equipment. A fleet of 12 fireboats, including two command boats, one diving support vessel and two diving support speedboats provide fire protection and rescue services within Hong Kong.

=== Ambulance services ===
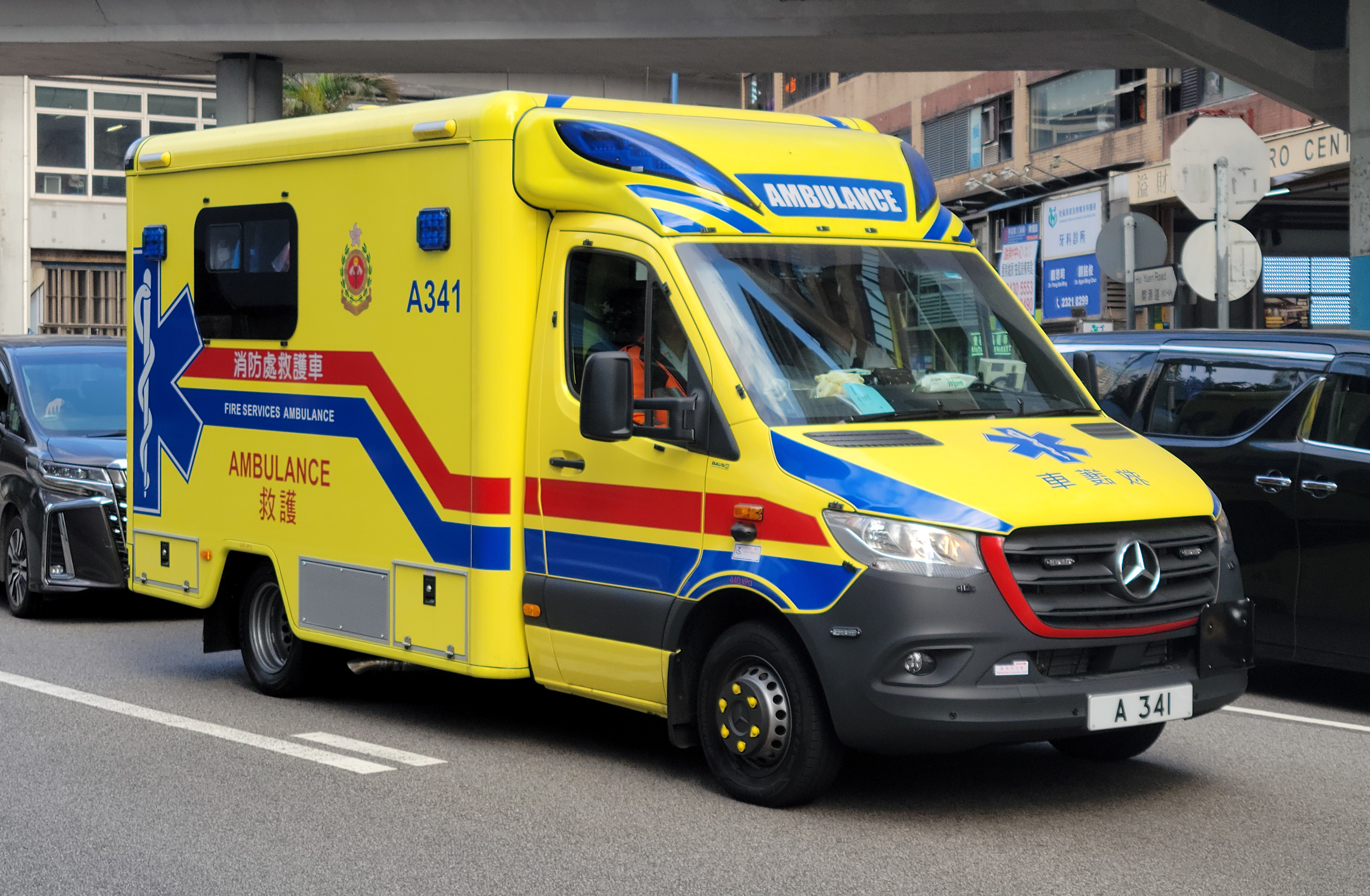
Hong Kong Fire Services ambulance

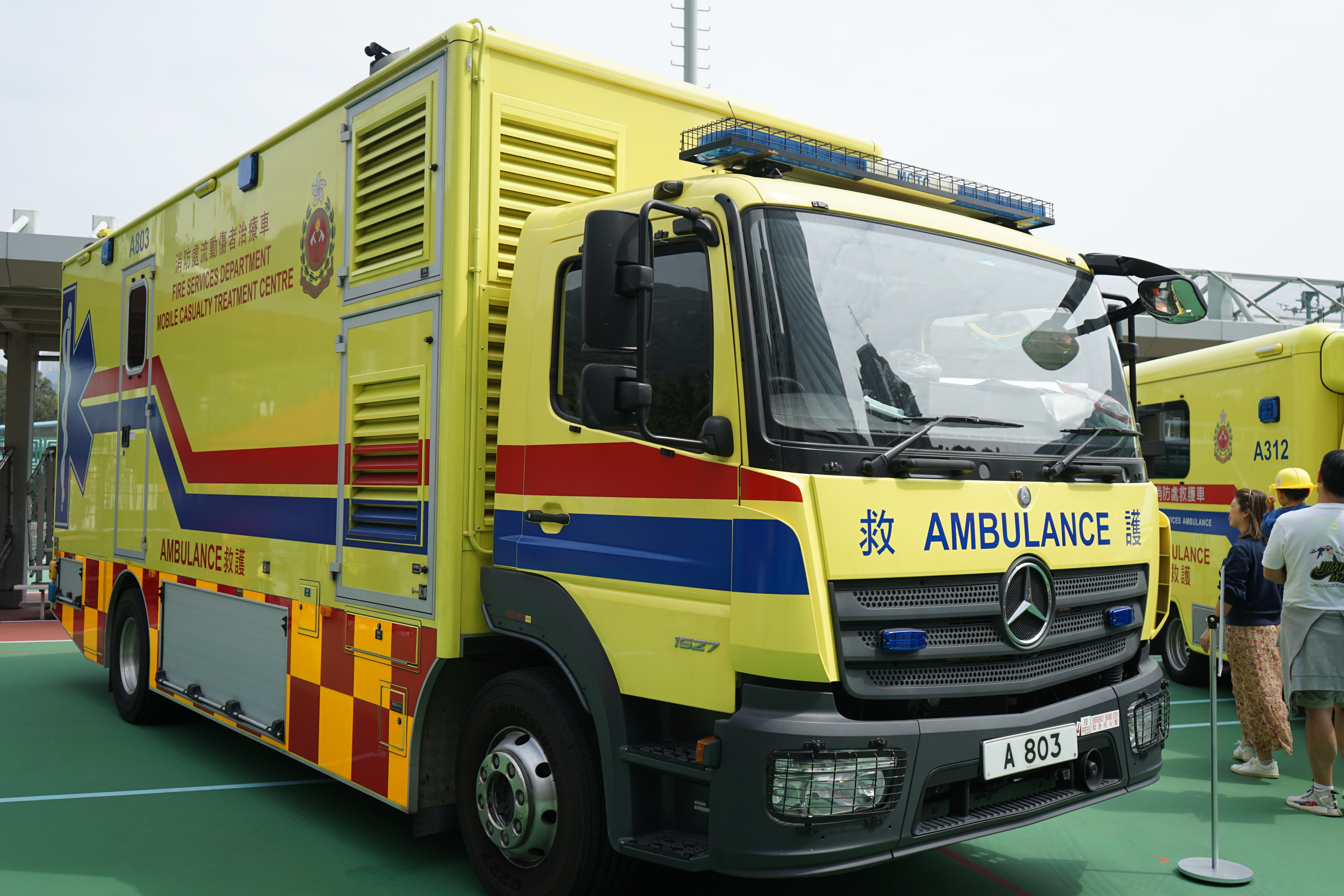
Mercedes-Benz Atego mobile casualty treatment unit

The Ambulance Command operates from 42 depots with 2,350 uniformed staff. The services fleet consists of 536 vehicles, including four village ambulances, four mobile casualty treatment centres and paramedic motorcycles. All motorcycles and ambulances are equipped with paramedic facilities to provide paramedic care. In 2024, the Command responded to 823,655 calls, attending to a total of 521,127 patients or casualties to hospitals/clinics, or an average of 1,575 calls a day. There were 106 cases of ambulance personnel sustaining injury whilst on active duty in 2004. Front-line firemen are also trained as first-responders to provide basic life support to casualties and patients before the arrival of an ambulance crew. First-responders are available in all fire stations.

Non emergency transfers are also provided by the FSD Ambulance Command. Starting in 2024, a specialist Critical Care and Infection Control ambulance was introduced into service to transfer acute patients or patients with infectious diseases.

=== Communications ===
The Fire Services Communication Centre (FSCC) is equipped with a computerised mobilising system for the efficient and effective mobilising of fire-fighting and ambulance resources for fires and emergencies. It is linked to all fire stations, ambulance depots and fireboat stations for dispatch of resources. The FSCC, staffed around the clock, also caters for receipt of complaints and enquiries of fire hazards and dangerous goods. During major incidents, it acts as a co-ordinator for government departments and public utilities. The FSCC has five Mobile Command Units which serve as on-scene command and control centres in major incidents. The Third Generation Mobilising System came into operation in phases starting in the first quarter of 2005. The system's objective is to further enhance the capability and efficiency in mobilisation and communications to meet anticipated growth of emergency calls over the next decade.

Since 2011, dispatchers are able to give post-dispatch advice to callers whilst they are waiting for an ambulance or fire appliance to attend. This allows callers to provide timely and appropriate first aid and stabilise time-critical patients.

=== Licensing and certification ===
The Licensing and Certification Command enforces fire safety regulations and policies, and processes the registration of fire service installation contractors. The Policy Division deals mainly with the formulation of guidelines on fire protection matters, prosecutions, research and approval of portable fire-fighting equipment and gas cylinders. The Dangerous Goods Division is responsible for the licensing of dangerous goods stores and vehicles, and timber stores. The Fire Service Installations Division and Ventilation Division are responsible for inspecting fire service installations and ventilating systems in buildings respectively. The two regional offices － the Hong Kong and Kowloon West and the New Territories and Kowloon East － are responsible for advising other government authorities on the fire safety measures for the purposes of licensing/registering various types of premises. Officers of the Command are seconded to the Home Affairs Department to inspect hotels, guesthouses, private clubs and bedspace apartments, and formulate fire safety requirements on these premises; whereas some are seconded to the Social Welfare Department to advise on fire protection measures in residential care homes for the elderly.

=== Fire safety ===
The Fire Safety Command assists and advises the public on fire protection measures with the aim of enhancing their fire safety awareness. The Community Relations Division is responsible for promoting fire safety and co-ordinating with other government departments and District Fire Safety Committees in stepping up fire prevention publicity. To promote fire safety awareness at district levels, the Division works closely with local fire stations in organising fire safety talks, seminars, exhibitions, fire drills and training of Fire Safety Ambassadors, who are volunteers from various sectors of the community to raise awareness of fire safety. The Commercial Buildings and Premises Division enforces the Fire Safety (Commercial Premises) Ordinance for upgrading fire safety measures in prescribed commercial premises (i.e. supermarkets, department stores, shopping arcades, banks, jewelry or goldsmith premises and off-course betting centres) and specified commercial buildings (i.e. commercial buildings constructed or the plans of building works of which first submitted to the Building Authority for approval on or before 1 March 1987). A Building Safety Loan Scheme has also been established to provide financial assistance to owners of such premises and buildings to upgrade the fire safety measures where necessary. Pending implementation of the Fire Safety (Buildings) Ordinance, the Building Improvement and Support Division continues to inspect old private composite and domestic buildings with a view to enhancing fire safety and advising owners and occupiers concerned on the improved standards to be required. The Fire Service Installation Task Force inspects fire service installations in buildings, handles complaints regarding building fire service installations and monitors the performance of registered fire service installation contractors. The Railway Development Strategy Division scrutinises fire safety strategies and processes building plans of new railway infrastructure projects. It also carries out acceptance tests of fire service installations on completion of those projects. The Theme Park Projects Division formulates fire safety requirements for buildings and other supporting infrastructures in the Hong Kong Disneyland theme park in Penny's Bay. It also carries out acceptance tests on fire service installations upon completion of these works.

=== Administration and logistic support ===
The Headquarters Command offers policy, planning, management and logistic support to the operational commands. It also oversees the operation of Fire Services Communication Centre, Airport Fire Contingent, Fire Services Training School, recruitment and examination, workshops and transport, stores and supplies, diving service, physical training, information and publicity matters, staff welfare and statistics. The Administration Division, staffed by civilians, deals with departmental establishment, personnel, finance, appointments, general matters, staff relations, audit and translation service.

=== Airport fire contingent ===
The primary role of the contingent is to provide rescue and fire fighting coverage for Hong Kong International Airport. The contingent, which comprises 4 fire stations (North, South, East and Central) and two sea rescue berths (east and west ends of Chep Lap Kok) at strategic locations on the airport platform, is equipped with 21 fire appliances, three ambulances, two command boats and eight speedboats.

=== Diving services ===
The Diving Unit has a fleet of five diving tenders, one diving support vessel and two diving support speedboats deployed at seven strategic locations throughout Hong Kong, and a three-compartment compression chamber at Stonecutter's Island for treating patients with decompression illness and requiring hyperbaric oxygen treatment. It comprises about 136 active divers responsible for maritime search and rescue within Hong Kong waters down to the maximum depth of 70 metres using compressed air diving equipment and underwater breaking-in tools with penetration.

== Training ==
Fire and Ambulance Services Academy (FASA) provides initial training for recruit fire and ambulance personnel. It also provides refresher and advanced training courses for all fire personnel. Fire Services Ambulance Command Training School (FSACTS) provides initial and paramedic training to recruits and ambulance personnel. It also provides Advanced Ambulance Aid Training at first-responder level to serving fire personnel. The duration of various courses ranges from one day to 26 weeks. The fire and ambulance recruits who have successfully completed the initial training courses will be posted to fire stations and ambulance depots respectively to continue their on-the-job training in order to gain field experience. Apart from providing training for staff of other government departments, private organisations and overseas fire officers, FSTS also runs Youth Pre-employment Training Programmes and Smart Teen Challenge Camps for youngsters jointly with the Labour Department and the Education and Manpower Bureau respectively. FSACTS also provides initial and refresher training on cardio-pulmonary resuscitation to members of the public. In addition to overseas training on latest fire services technology and management skills, officers and instructors also attend various advanced courses conducted by overseas fire professionals in Hong Kong.

=== Workshops ===
The Workshops Division is responsible for all engineering matters relating to fire appliances, fire-fighting and rescue equipment. These include design, development, procurement, inspection and maintenance, fitting out, modification, testing and commissioning.

=== Response times ===
There are 84 fire stations, 42 ambulance depots and seven fireboat stations strategically located across the region. The graded response times for building fire calls are six minutes for built-up areas and nine to 23 minutes for areas of dispersed risks and isolated developments. For emergency ambulance services, the target response time is 12 minutes. The performance target is to achieve these response times in 92.5% of all calls. In 2024, 95.6% of building fire calls and 96.1% of emergency ambulance calls were responded to within the respective target response times.

=== Public liaison group ===
The group which comprises 30 members of the public from all walks of life monitors and improves the delivery of the department's public services. It helps foster better understanding between the public and the department.

== Equipment ==
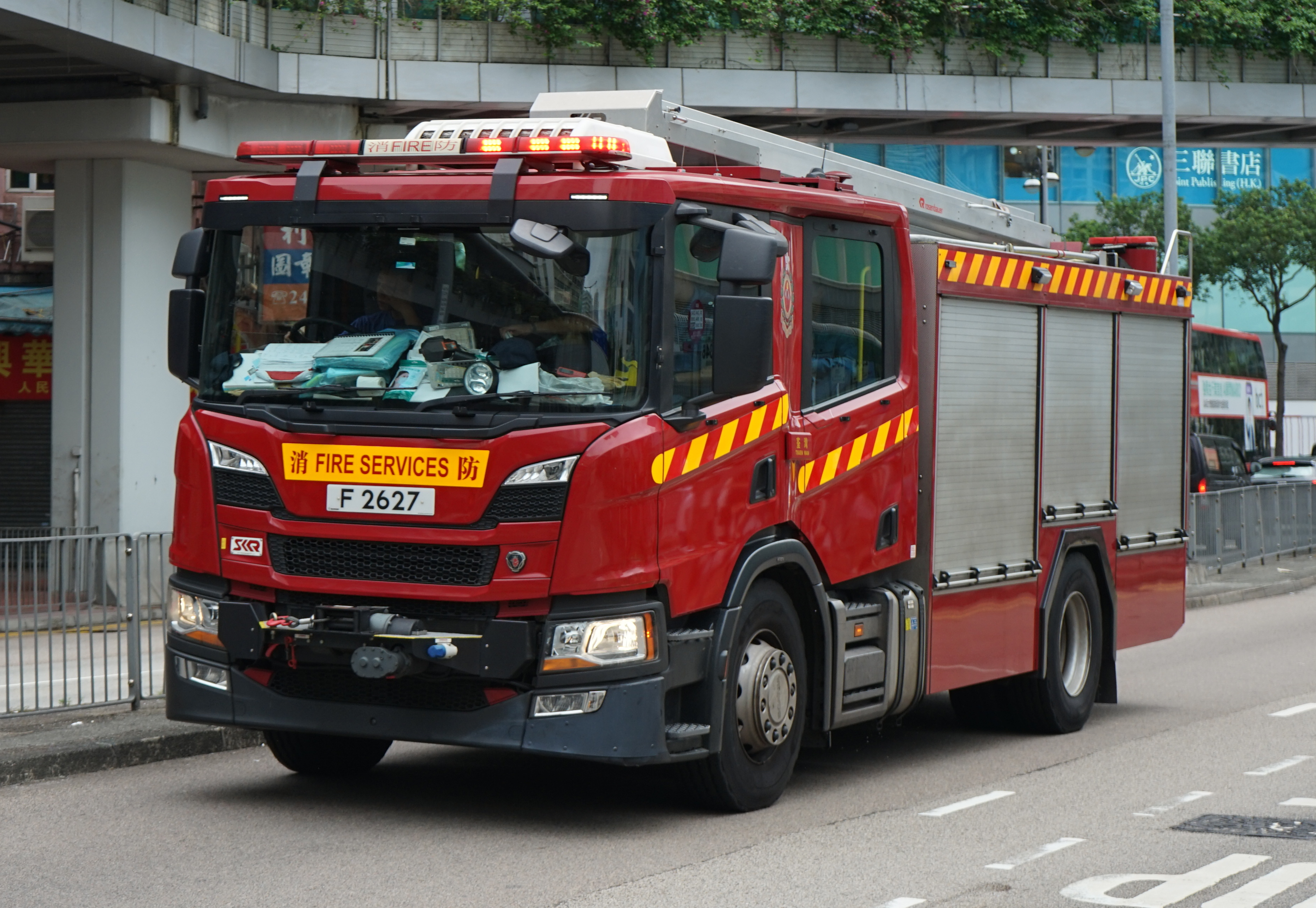
Scania Pumper

The Fire Services Department of Hong Kong is a force of 10,000-plus firefighters serving one of the most densely populated urban areas in the world. They served under the British before 1997 and are equipped much like their counterparts in the United Kingdom.

While most cities' high-rise buildings are concentrated in their commercial areas in the central business districts, they are ubiquitous in Hong Kong. Most residential buildings in this very crowded Asian metropolis are more than twenty storeys tall, with some reaching forty or fifty storeys and the tallest over seventy.

Thanks to strict fire code and the use of non-flammable materials, severe structural fires are rare. The Fire Services Department is nonetheless equipped with a significant quantity of hydraulic platforms and possesses some of the tallest ladder platforms in the world.

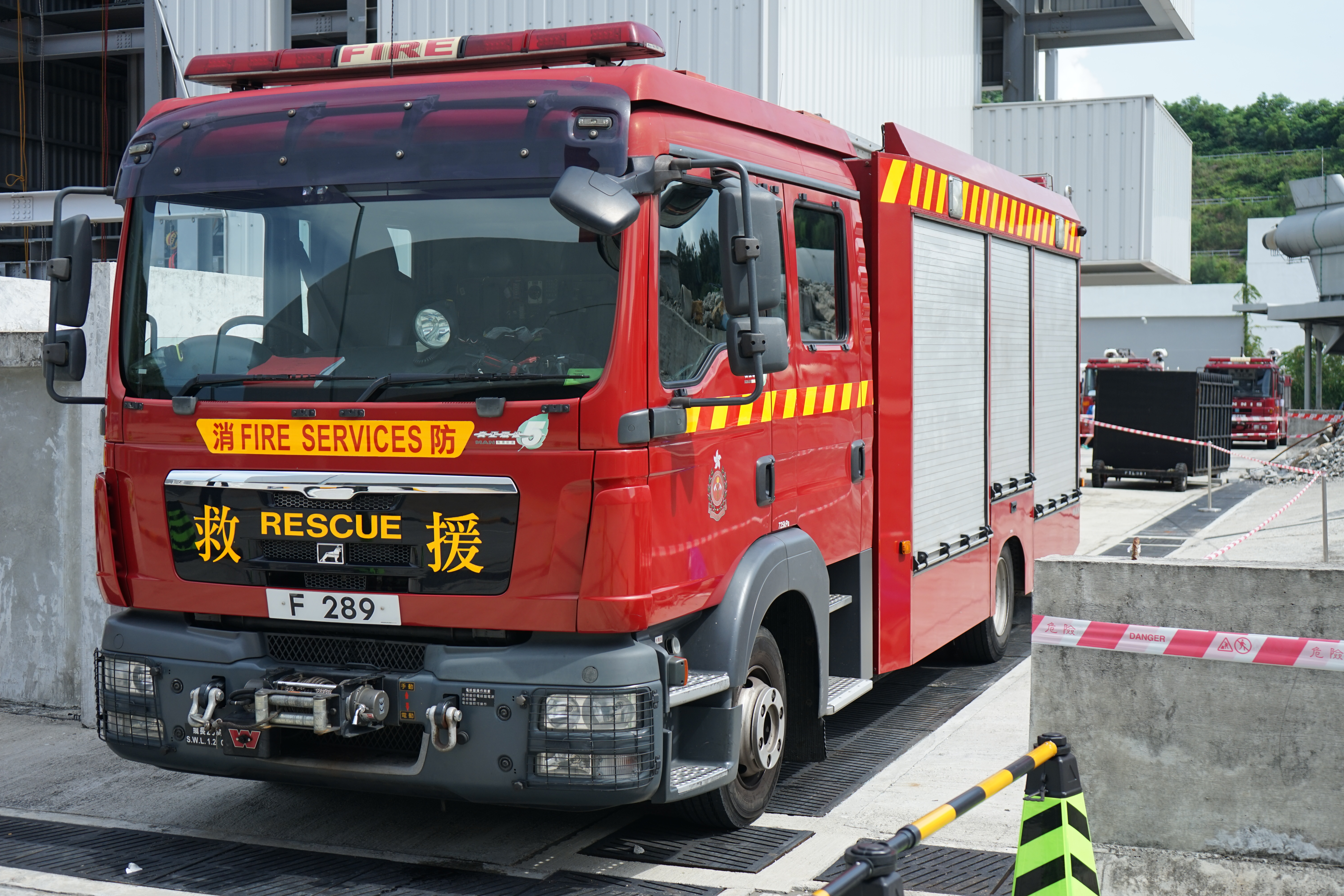
Major Rescue Unit

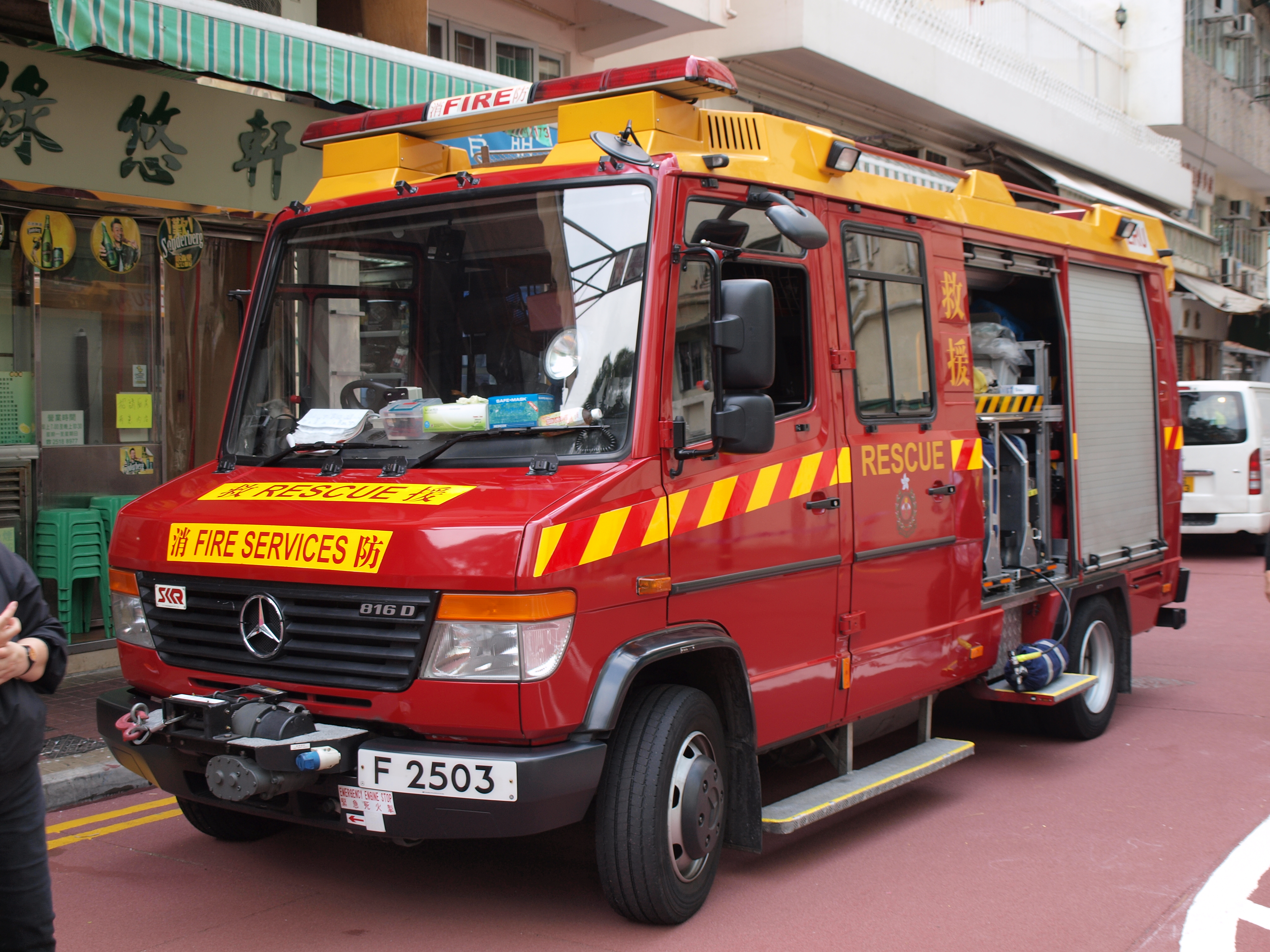
Light Rescue Unit

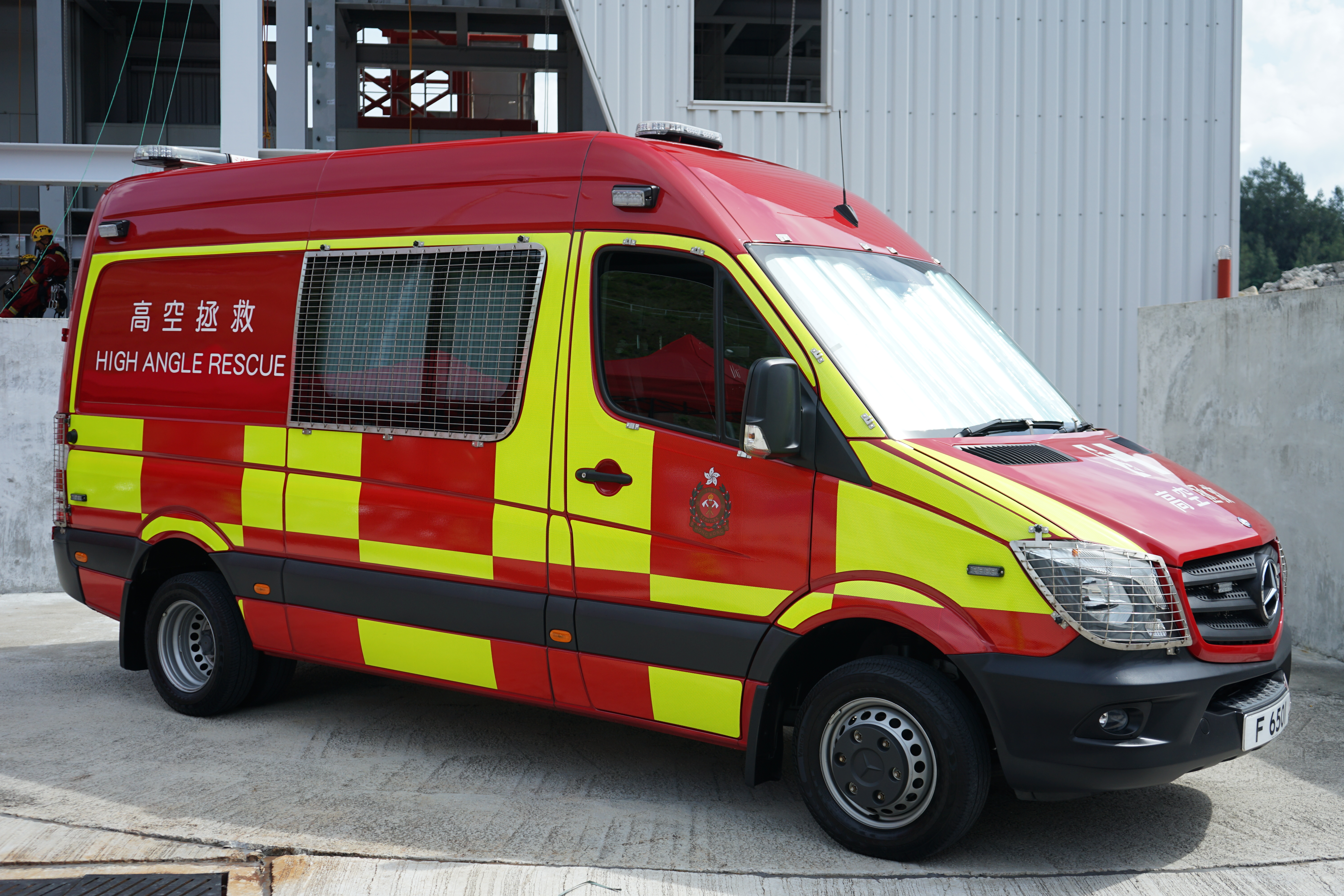
High Angle Rescue

Common fire engines in Hong Kong include:

- Hydraulic Platforms: Carry out firefighting and rescue at elevated levels – similar of snorkel, aerial tower or cherry pickers used in North America
- Major Pumpers: Basically Type B Water Tenders that provide water supply – called pumpers in North America
- Turntable Ladder: Similar to Hydraulic Platforms but they use telescopic ladders instead of hydraulic platforms and are better suited for high level rescue – called aerial in North America
- Light Rescue Units: First-strike fire appliances, equipped with varieties of rescue equipments
- Major Rescue Units: Also serve as light rescue units but are capable of special missions when teamed up with the rescue tenders
- Mobile Command Units: Field command centre
- Rescue Tenders: Perform rescue missions in major disasters
- Hazmat Tenders: Hazardous materials handling
- Hazmat Pods: Equipped with radioactivity detectors, protective aprons and decontaminating tools, Hazmat Pods are used in nuclear/biohazardous incidents.
- Lighting Tenders: Provide lighting
- Hose Layer: Carry hoses for water relay
- Light Pumping Appliances: Perform pumping or rescue operations when area is inaccessible to major appliances
- Reserve Heavy Pumps: Conduct water relay and pumping in remote areas or major fires
- Snorkels: Perform rescue operations at 26–30 m.
- Aerial Ladder Platforms (ALP): Carry a telescopic ladder and capable of reaching 47–53 m

The following appliances are mainly deployed to the airport and stations close to fuel depots:

- First Intervention Vehicle: Carries foam and water and capable of discharging 6000 litres per minute
- Foam Tenders: Carry out oil fuel fire fighting with foam and foam concentrate transportation
- Bulk Foam Tender: Supply foam concentrate, pre-mixed foam solution for First Intervention Vehicle for prolonged fuel oil fire fighting
- Jackless Snorkel: Equipped with a piercing nozzle that can pierce through the fuselage of airplanes and discharge foam in cabin. The FSD introduced this to prepare for the commencement of the Airbus A380.

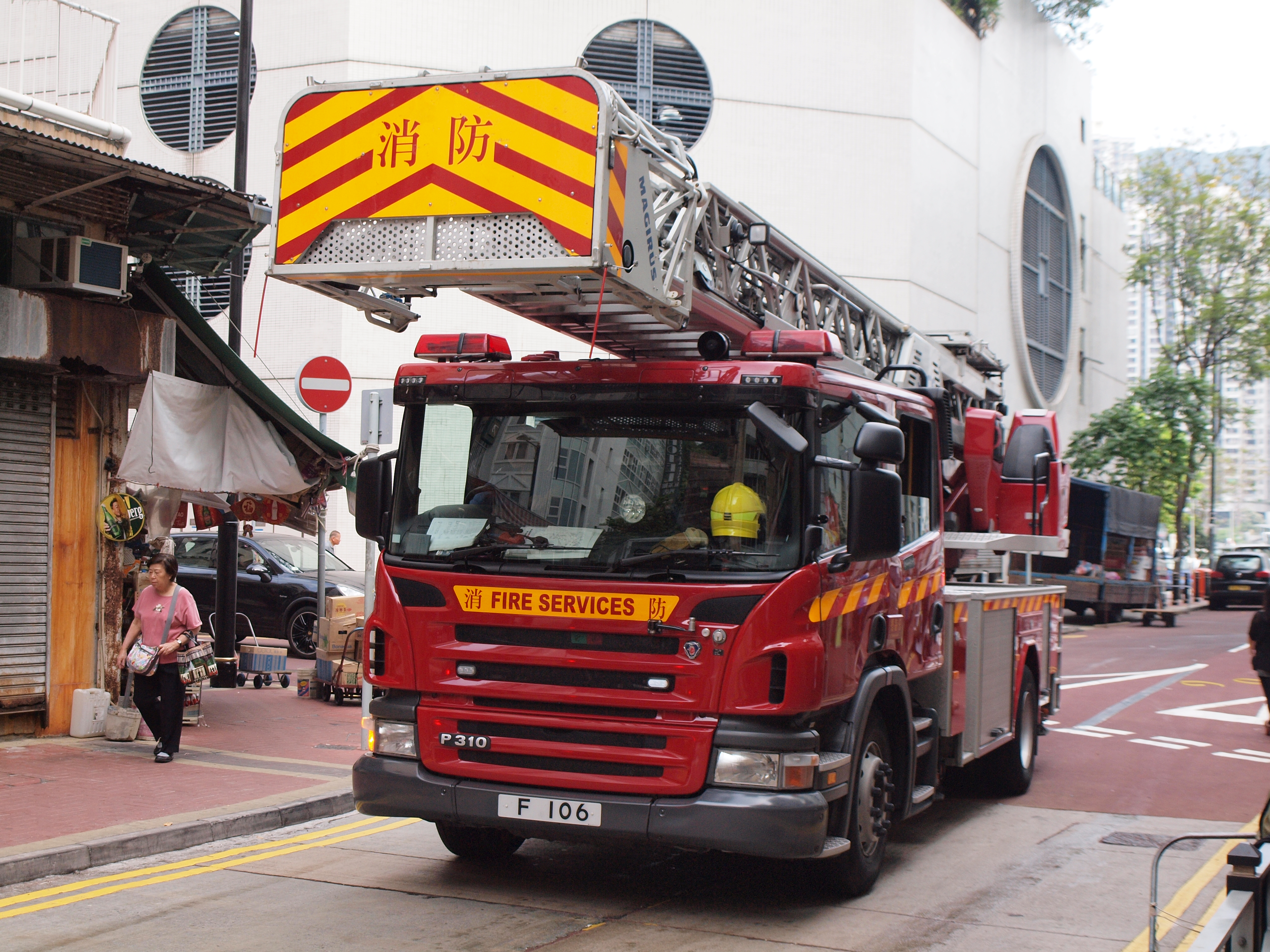
Turntable Ladder

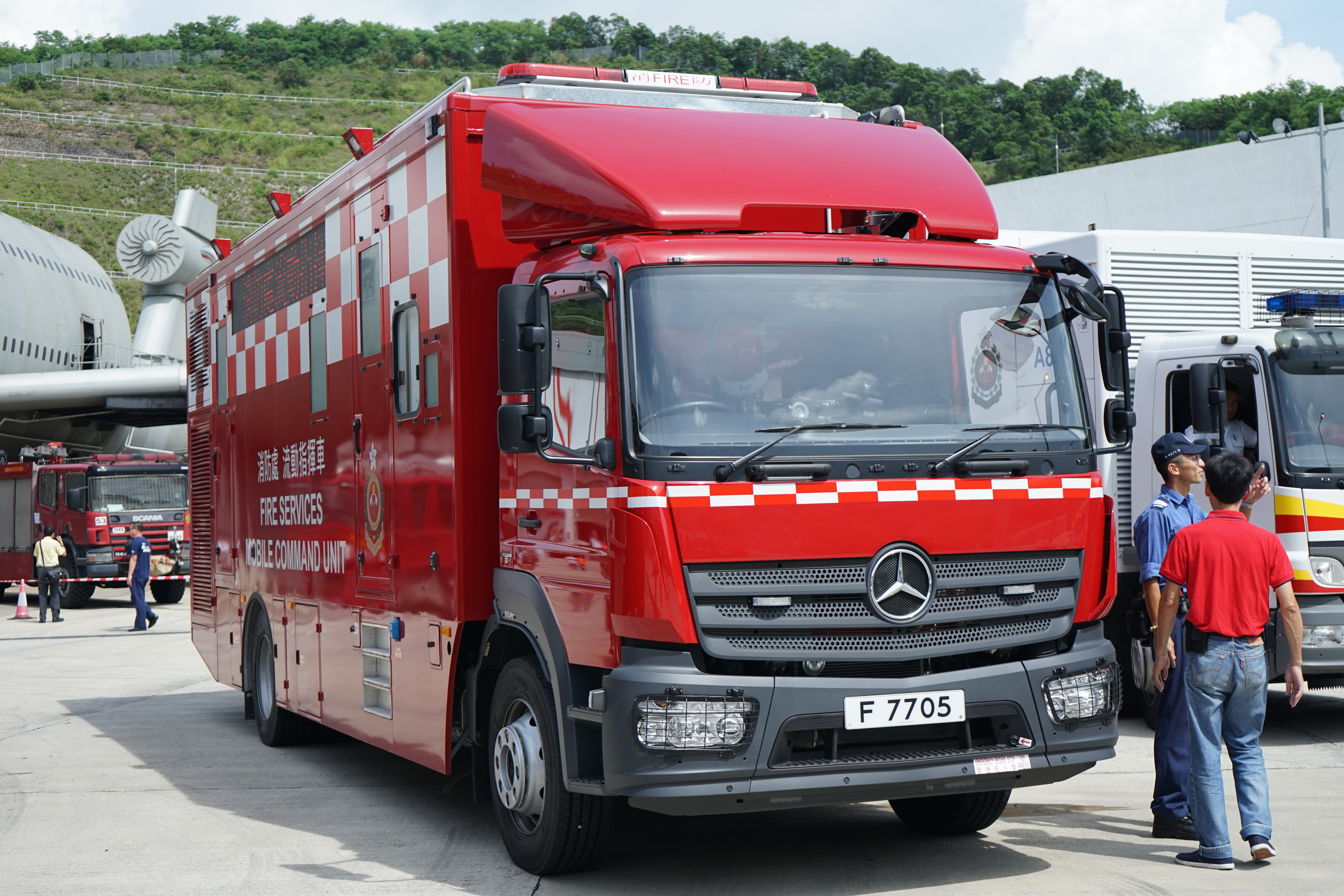
Mobile Command Unit

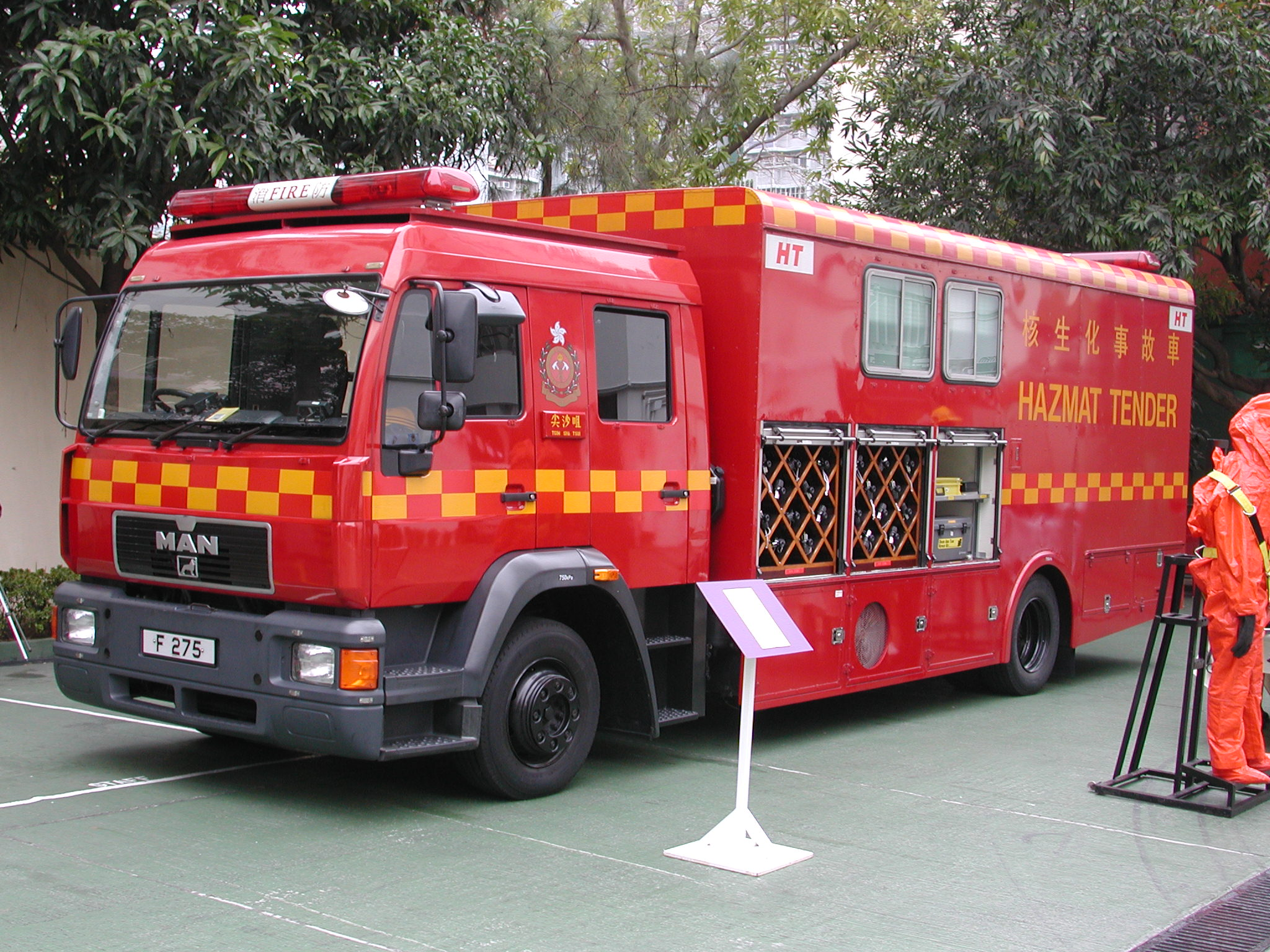
Hazmat tender

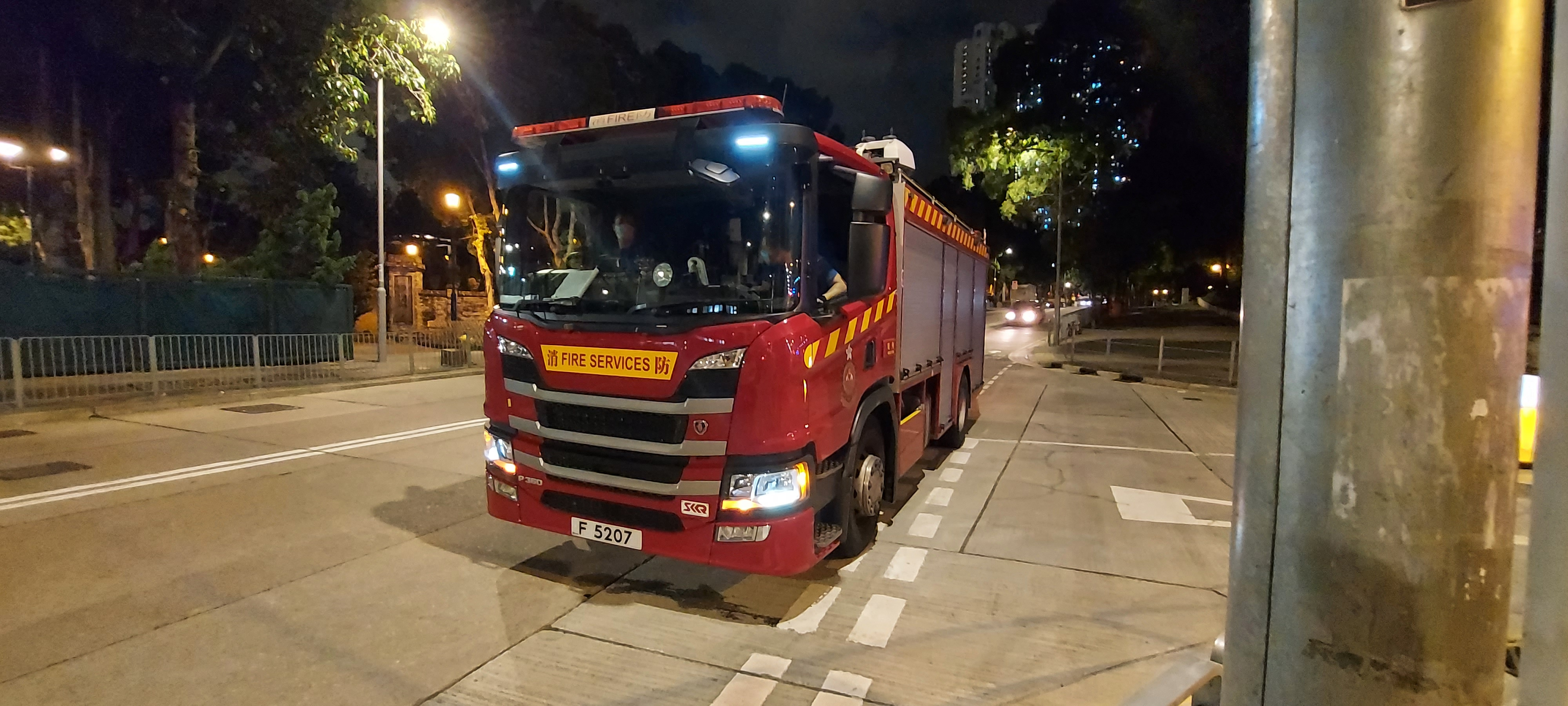
Heavy Pump

A list of vehicles used in the past and present:

- American LaFrance
- AEC Turntable ladder
- Austin LD3 ambulance
- Ford Transit ambulance
- Scania Hydraulic platform
- Dennis pumper
- ERF Turntable ladder
- Scania Turntable ladder 52m
- Magirus-Deutz Turntable ladder 37 / 50 / 55 m
- Iveco Turntable ladder
- MAN Hazmat tender
- MAN Angloco foam tender
- MAN Command unit
- MAN paramedic equipment tender
- Isuzu Command unit
- Isuzu mobile fire-fighting supporting machine carrier
- Isuzu paramedic equipment tender
- Scania P94GB-300 Rescue tender
- Scania P124GB-360 First intervention vehicle
- Scania P124GB-360 Heavy Pump
- Scania Jackless Snorkel – with Snozzle (Model S2000-CA)
- Mercedes-Benz Sprinter 414 416CDI 518CDI ambulance - European Class C / American Type III
- Mercedes-Benz E-310 ambulances – European Class B
- Mercedes-Benz Sprinter 316CDI light ambulance – European Class C / American Type I
- Suzuki EDE51V village ambulance – European Class C / American Type I
- AEC Mobile Casualty Treatment Centre
- Mercedes-Benz 1828L (F581) Mobile Casualty Treatment Centre
- Dennis DFS237R4B Mobile Casualty Treatment Centre
- Mercedes-Benz 1517L Mobile Casualty Treatment Centre
- Safe at Sea RescueRunner
- BMW R850RT motorcycle
- BMW R900RT motorcycle
- Honda ST1300 Pan European motorcycle
- Scania Snorkel (SS263)
- Land Rover 130 Defender ambulance
- Dennis Sabre pumper/engine
- Dennis Rapier
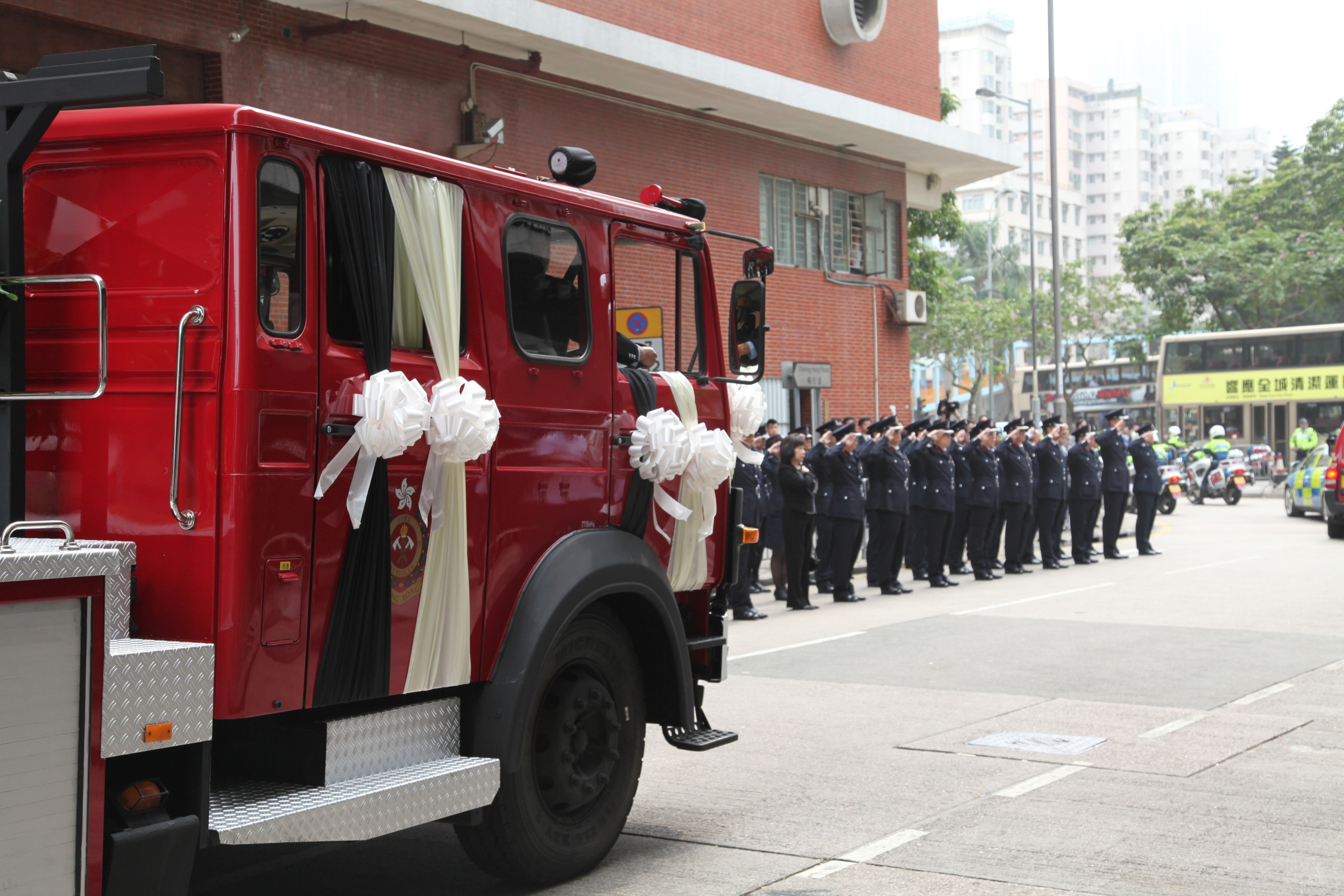
  A retired Iveco 140-25 for funerals

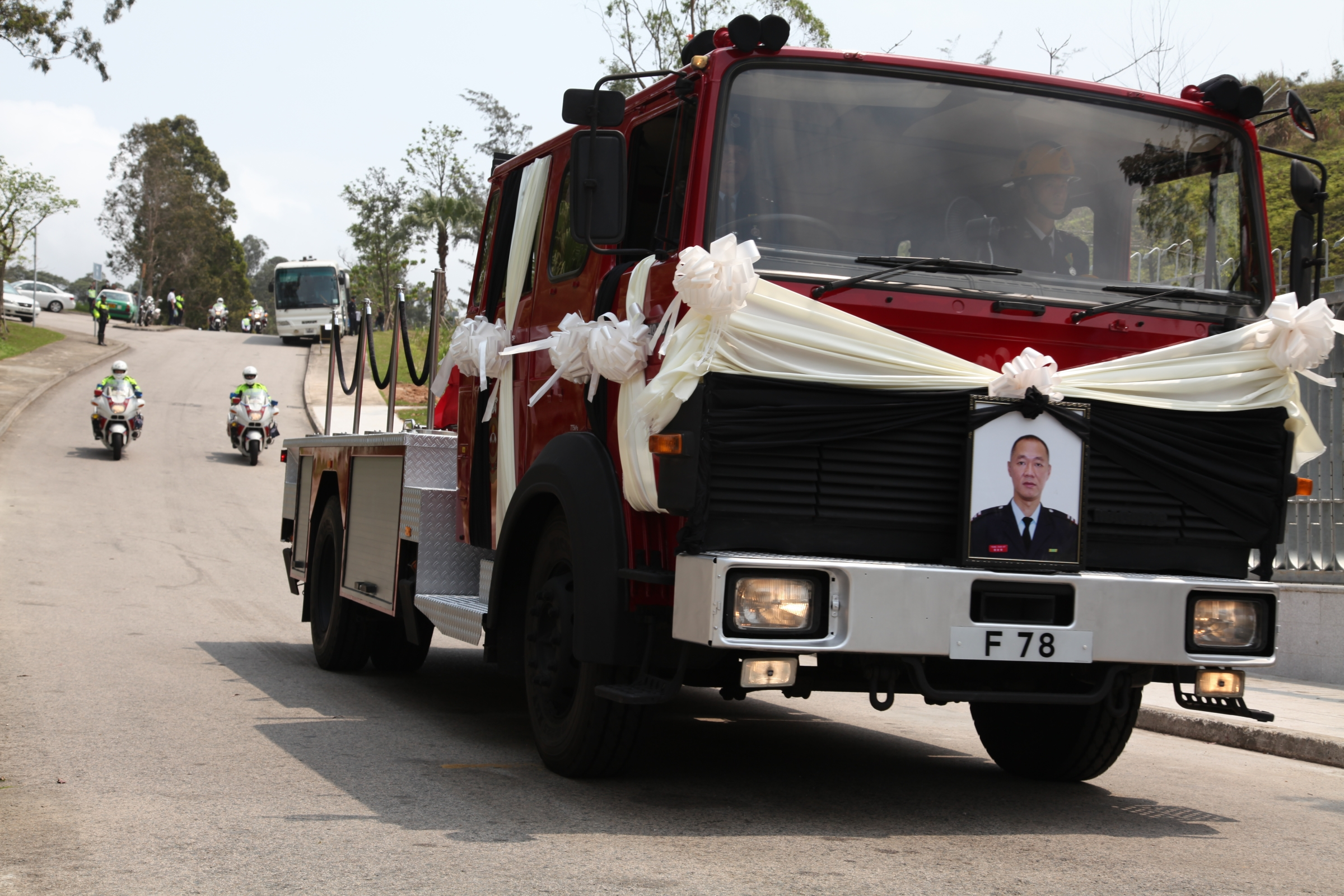
Front view of the funeral Turntable Ladder

For funerals Turntable Ladder with turntable unit removed is used to carry the coffin.

=== Gear (Incident Uniform) ===
- Gallet F1 XF helmet (2015) – all fire crews
- USAR rescue helmet – for urban search teams
- EMS rescue helmet – for ambulance personnel

For other ranks, the name of the station is printed on both sides of the helmet e.g. Shek Kip Mei – SKM on the sides of the helmet. All station names abbreviations are in letters form. However, this does not apply to officers as their rank is shown by stars and pipes on the side of their helmet, unlike other ranks who display their rank as thin lines on their helmets.

- Nomex protection hood
- PBI Matrix Structural Firefighting protection tunic/trousers (2010–)
- fire retardant up to 1093c

== Superintendents and Chief Fire Officers ==
- Charles E. May (1868–1879) – Superintendent of the Hong Kong Fire
- Francis Joseph Badeley – Superintendent of the Hong Kong Fire Brigade
- Thomas Henry King – Chief Fire Officer
- Philip Peveril John Wodehouse – Chief Fire Officer
- Henry Tom Brooks (1880–1940) – appointed as Superintendent of the then Hong Kong Fire Brigade in 1922 and was Chief Officer of the Fire Brigade when he retired in 1937 (and his son John Brooks would become Deputy Chief Officer retiring in 1955)

== Directors of Fire Services ==
The Director of Fire Services was created in 1961 and replaced the role of Chief Fire Officer and Superintendent of Fire Services:

Directors appointed (1961–present)
Status	Name
Hong Kong	1. William James Gorman (1961); 2. Ronald Godfrey Cox (1961–1965); 3. Joseph Milner (1965–1970); 4. Alfred Evelyn Harry Wood OBE (1970–1975); 5. Frederick Morphet Watson (1975–1983); 6. Frederick Morphet Watson (1983–1984); 7. Robert Holmes (1984–1987); 8. John Howard March (1987–1992) – last British head of the fire service 9. Lam Chek Yuen (1992–1995) – first local head of the fire service
Hong Kong	1. Peter Cheung (1995–1998); 2. Tsang Kwong Yu (1998–2001); 3. Hsu King Ping (2001–2003); 4. Anthony Lam Chun Man (2003 – 6 December 2005); 5. Kwok Jing Keung, FSDSM, J.P. (7 December 2005 – 2 December 2007); 6. Lo Chun Hung Gregory, FSDSM, J.P. (3 December 2007 – 30 September 2011); 7. Andy Chan Chor-kam, FSDSM (1 October 2011 – 23 June 2014); 8. LAI Man-hin, FSDSM (24 June 2014 – 14 August 2016); 9. Darryl Li Kin-yat, FSDSM (15 August 2016 – 17 April 2020); 10. Joseph Leung Wai-hung, FSDSM (18 April 2020 – 25 March 2022); 11. Andy Yeung Yan-kin, FDSM (26 March 2022 – present)

=== Superintendent of Fire Services ===
- Charles May (1868–1879)

== Ranks and insignia ==
=== Directorate ===
- Director of Fire Services (DFS) (Traditional Chinese: 消防處處長): Bauhinia over pip over wreathed and crossed torches
  - Deputy Director of Fire Services (DDFS) (Traditional Chinese: 消防處副處長): Bauhinia over wreathed and crossed torches

=== Firefighters ===
- Chief Fire Officer (CFO) (Traditional Chinese: 消防總長): pip over wreathed and crossed torches
  - Deputy Chief Fire Officer (DCFO) (Traditional Chinese: 副消防總長): two pips over wreathed crest
    - Senior Divisional Officer (SDO) (Traditional Chinese: 高級消防區長): pip over wreathed crest
      - Divisional Officer (DO) (Traditional Chinese: 消防區長): wreathed crest
        - Assistant Divisional Officer (ADO) (Traditional Chinese: 助理消防區長): three pips
          - Senior Station Officer (SStnO) (Traditional Chinese: 高級消防隊長): two pips over bar
            - Station Officer (StnO) (Traditional Chinese: 消防隊長): two pips
              - Probationary Station Officer (PStnO) (Traditional Chinese: 見習消防隊長): pip
                - Principal Fireman (PFn) (Traditional Chinese: 消防總隊目): three bars
                  - Senior Fireman (SFn) (Traditional Chinese: 消防隊目): two bars
                    - Fireman (Fn) (Traditional Chinese: 消防員): slide

=== Ambulance ===
- Chief Ambulance Officer (CAO) (Traditional Chinese: 救護總長): pip over wreathed and crosses torches
  - Deputy Chief Ambulance Officer (DCAO) (Traditional Chinese: 副救護總長): two pips over wreathed crest
    - Senior Assistant Chief Ambulance Officer (SACAO) (Traditional Chinese: 高級助理救護總長): pip over wreathed crest over bar
      - Assistant Chief Ambulance Officer (ACAO) (Traditional Chinese: 助理救護總長): pip over wreathed crest
        - Ambulance Superintendent (Supt) (Traditional Chinese: 救護監督): wreathed crest
          - Senior Ambulance Officer (SAO) (Traditional Chinese: 高級救護主任): three pips
            - Ambulance Officer (AO) (Traditional Chinese: 救護主任): two pips
              - Probationary Ambulance Officer (PAO) (Traditional Chinese: 見習救護主任): pip
                - Principal Ambulanceman (PAmbm) (Traditional Chinese: 救護總隊目): three bars
                  - Senior Ambulanceman (SAmbm) (Traditional Chinese: 救護隊目): two bars
                    - Ambulanceman (Ambm) (Traditional Chinese: 救護員): slide

== Crest and flag ==
The current Fire Service crest was adopted in 1997 to replace the pre-handover crest due to presence of colonial elements. The changes impacted both uniforms (lapels, buttons, helmets, caps), vehicles, flags and other signage.

=== Crest ===
The new crest removed all colonial elements. Laurel wreath was retained. St Edward's Crown was replaced with Bauhinia. The motto changed from the uni-lingual Fire Services - Hong Kong to the bilingual Fire Services Hong Kong (消防). The badge theme changed from a crowned lion holding a pearl to a pair of fire axes and a burning torch

=== Flag ===
As the crest was also used on the flag, it too was changed in 1997. The old red flag was replaced by a purple flag with the new crest. This flag is only flown at Headquarters, whereas the Flag of the Hong Kong Special Administrative Region flies at all fire stations.

== Fire services on TV and film ==
The fire service has been portrayed in a number of Hong Kong TV series and films:

- Burning Flame – 1998 TVB series
- Burning Flame II – 2002 TVB series
- Burning Flame III – 2009 TVB series
- Lifeline – 1997 film of pre-handover FS
- F.S.D. / Elite Brigade – 2010 RTHK series
- As the Light Goes Out – 2014 film of post-handover FS
- Life on the Line – 2018 film about Cheung Sha Wan ambulance station
- Cesium Fallout - 2024 film about a possible first nuclear radiation disaster
