= Rescuerunner =

Rescue vessel type

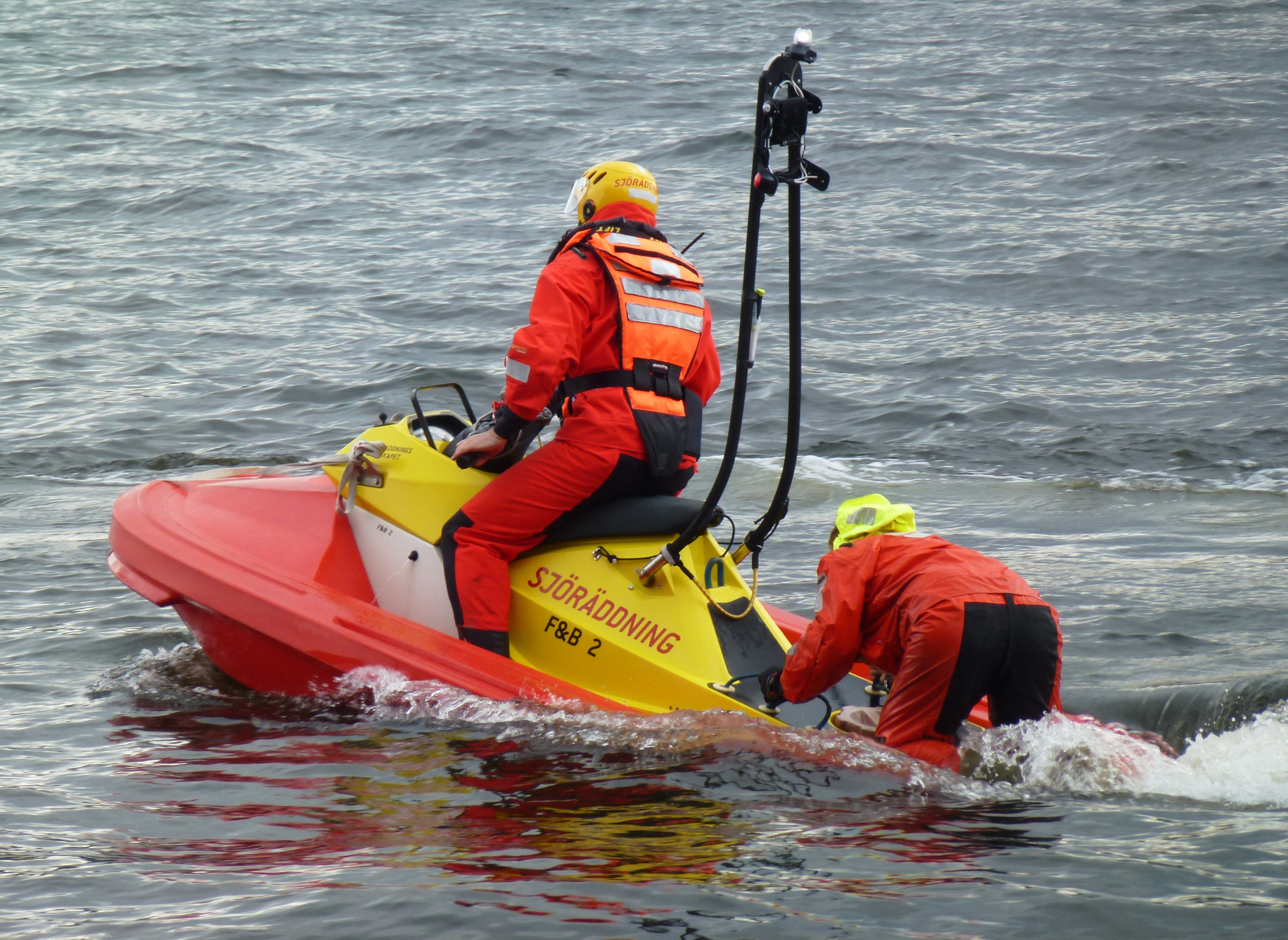

General characteristics
- Length: 3.6 meter
- Beam: 1.5 meter
- Draft: 0.3 meter
- Installed power: 140 hp
- Speed: 40 knots
- Crew: 1 or 2

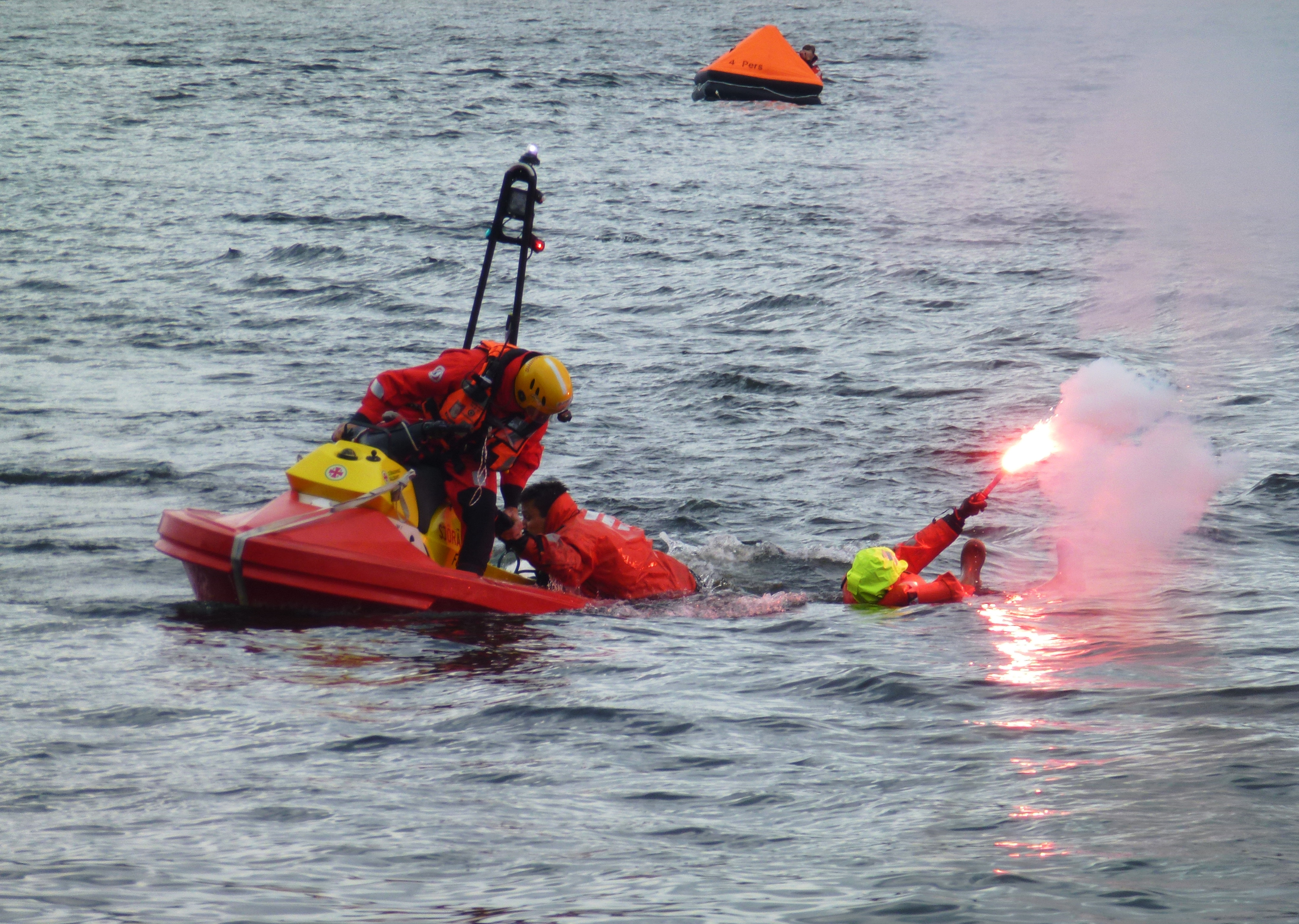
Sea rescue training with a Rescuerunner.

Rescuerunner is the name of a personal water craft designed by the Swedish Sea Rescue Society (SSRS).

The Rescuerunner was developed for use under conditions where larger vessels can't easily operate, such as shallow waters, near cliffs or in lakes only accessible to boats after being carried over land. A Rescuerunner craft is normally operated by one person and weighs about 350 kilograms. The first prototype was tested in 2003, and the first six series-production vessels were made the following year. The project was continued by the company Safe at Sea AB in 2006.

The vessel was featured on a Swedish postage stamp in 2007, part of a series of three stamps commemorating the 100th anniversary of SSRS.
