= Daggers (disambiguation) =

Daggers is the plural of dagger.

It may also refer to:

- Daggers (All Hail the Silence album), a 2019 album by All Hail the Silence
- Daggers (The Defiled album), a 2013 album by The Defiled
- "Daggers" (seaQuest DSV), the first episode of seaQuest DSV's second season
