= Dennis Dagger =

Compact Dennis fire engine

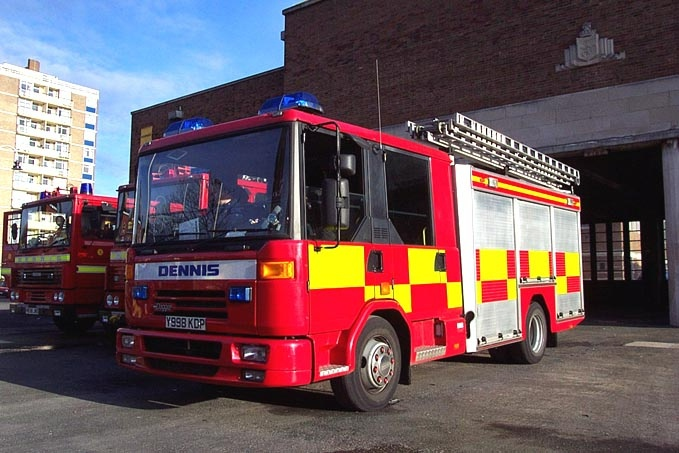
- An ex-demonstrator Dennis Dagger of the Merseyside Fire and Rescue Service.

Overview
- Type: Fire engine
- Manufacturer: Dennis Specialist Vehicles
- Production: 2002-2007
- Assembly: Slyfield Industrial Estate, Guildford
- Designer: Dennis Fire

Body and chassis
- Class: Large goods vehicle (N2, N3)
- Body style: Cab over engine
- Related: Dennis Sabre

Powertrain
- Engine: Cummins C260 Euro 3, turbocharged and intercooled
- Transmission: Allison '2000'-series automatic

Dimensions
- Wheelbase: 3,650 mm (143.7 in)
- Length: 3,800 mm (149.6 in)
- Width: 2,300 mm (90.6 in)
- Height: 2,535 mm (99.8 in)
- Kerb weight: 12,500 kg (27,558 lb)

Chronology
- Predecessor: Dennis DS series

The Dennis Dagger is a compact fire engine manufactured by Dennis Specialist Vehicles from 1998 to 2007. It was built for fire brigades operating in narrow rural areas unsuitable for full-size fire engines, a market previously explored by the Dennis DS series.

First designed in 1997 with the internal codename of F98 (short for Fire 1998), production would begin by 2002. Visually and mechanically similar to the full-size Dennis Sabre, the Dennis Dagger could be bodied with a John Dennis Coachbuilders body. Sales were originally aimed at the Kent and Devon and Somerset fire services, but in competition with other narrow truck conversions such as the MAN truck range, the Dagger sold poorly, going on to be the final new fire engine produced by Dennis Specialist Vehicles before the company's closure in 2007.

Operators of the Dennis Dagger included the Hertfordshire and West Sussex fire brigades, with the Merseyside Fire and Rescue Service and the Dublin Fire Brigade respectively operating two former demonstrators in the past. A development chassis was registered as late as 2011.

Outside of the UK, the New Zealand Fire Service is the only known foreign customer and operator of the Dagger, after a pair were ordered as a trial in 2004. One of the ex-demonstrators, which itself had also been operated by the Merseyside Fire and Rescue Service was purchased by the NZFS a year later in 2005. As of 2025, all three examples remain in service in New Zealand, albeit operated by the NZFS’s successor agency, FENZ. The ex-demonstrator is currently allocated at Hari Hari and the trial Daggers at Springfield and Taumarunui, respectively.

== See also ==
- Dennis Sabre, the Dagger's full-size equivalent.
