= Dagger (disambiguation) =

A dagger is a short-bladed weapon.

Dagger may also refer to:

== Places ==
- Daggar, Pakistan
- Daggar Tehsil, in Pakistan
- Dagger Complex, a US military base in Darmstadt, Germany

== Arts, entertainment, and media ==
- Dagger (comics), a superhero in the Marvel Comics Universe
- Dagger Awards, by the Crime Writers' Association (CWA)
- Garnet Til Alexandros XVII or Dagger, a character in the video game Final Fantasy IX

== Mathematics ==
- $M^\dagger$, conjugate transpose matrix
- Dagger category in category theory
- $A\dagger B$, logical NOR operator or Quine's dagger

== Vehicles ==
- IAI Nesher, Israeli aircraft, Dagger in Argentine service
- Dennis Dagger, a fire engine

== People ==
- Will Dagger, English professional rugby league footballer

== Other uses ==
- †, dagger (mark) or obelus, typographical symbol
- Daggering, a Jamaican dance form
- The Daggers, Dagenham & Redbridge F.C., an English football club
- Nickname for a play by the Philadelphia Eagles during Super Bowl LIX
- "Dagger", a song by MisterWives from Nosebleeds
- Dagger (ornament), a design motif in stained glass

== See also ==
- Athame, a ceremonial blade
- Daggers (disambiguation)
- The Dagger (disambiguation)
- Double dagger (disambiguation)
- Kinzhal (missile)
