= Cummins C Series engine =

Straight-six diesel engine

Cummins C Series

Overview
- Manufacturer: Cummins
- Also called: ISC, QSC, C Gas Plus (CNG)
- Production: 1985-present

Layout
- Configuration: I6 diesel engine
- Displacement: 8.3 litres (506.5 cu in)
- Cylinder bore: 114 mm (4.5 in)
- Piston stroke: 135 mm (5.3 in)
- Cylinder block material: Cast iron
- Cylinder head material: Cast iron

Combustion
- Turbocharger: Holset
- Fuel system: Bosch P Pump
- Management: Mechanical
- Fuel type: Diesel
- Oil system: Wet sump
- Cooling system: Water cooled

Chronology
- Predecessor: 6C8.3
- Successor: L9 (ISL, QSL)

The Cummins C Series engine is a straight-six diesel engine with a displacement of 8.3 litres (506.5 cu in). Cummins began producing the engines in 1985 as the 6C8.3 (this was co-designed with the Case Corporation, along with the smaller 6B5.9). The first electronic version, known as the C8.3E and designed for the urban bus market exclusively, went into production in late 1996. The ISC was introduced in 1998 and used a CAPS electronically controlled injection system along with a 24 valve head, vs 12 valves on the 6C8.3.

By late 2003, Cummins announced that they will revise the engine to sport a High-Pressure Common-Rail (HPCR) system to help with emissions and also a variable geometry turbocharger system to help with the performance on this engine.

The Cummins ISC also has a sister engine which is designed off the existing ISC 8.3-litre cylinder block which runs on compressed natural gas (CNG). Cummins reintroduced this engine as the C PLUS engine which has a maximum power rating of 280 horsepower (209 kW; 284 PS). A few thousand units of this engine are now roaming in the world operating on a variety of applications.

== Applications ==
- Medium Duty Trucks
- Buses
- Marine
- Excavators
- Fork lifts
- Generators
- Heavy equipment

== Popular power ratings ==
Excavator

- 660 pound force-feet (895 N⋅m) @ 1,300 rpm, 260 horsepower (194 kW; 264 PS) electronically governed at 2,400 rpm
- 800 pound force-feet (1,085 N⋅m) @ 1,300 rpm, 280 horsepower (209 kW; 284 PS) electronically governed at 2,500 rpm
- 800 pound force-feet (1,085 N⋅m) @ 1,300 rpm, 285 horsepower (213 kW; 289 PS) electronically governed at 2,500 rpm
- 860 pound force-feet (1,166 N⋅m) @ 1,300 rpm, 300 horsepower (224 kW; 304 PS) electronically governed at 2,500 rpm

Generators

- 660 pound force-feet (895 N⋅m) @ 1,300 rpm, 250 horsepower (186 kW; 253 PS) electronically governed at 2,200 rpm
- 660 pound force-feet (895 N⋅m) @ 1,300 rpm, 260 horsepower (194 kW; 264 PS) electronically governed at 2,500 rpm
- 800 pound force-feet (1,085 N⋅m) @ 1,300 rpm, 280 horsepower (209 kW; 284 PS) electronically governed at 2,500 rpm
- 800 pound force-feet (1,085 N⋅m) @ 1,300 rpm, 285 horsepower (213 kW; 289 PS) electronically governed at 2,500 rpm
- 860 pound force-feet (1,166 N⋅m) @ 1,300 rpm, 300 horsepower (224 kW; 304 PS) electronically governed at 2,500 rpm
- 1,050 pound force-feet (1,424 N⋅m) @ 1,300 rpm, 310 horsepower (231 kW; 314 PS) electronically governed at 2,400 rpm

Excavator /generator

- 1,050 pound force-feet (1,424 N⋅m) @ 1,300 rpm, 310 horsepower (231 kW; 314 PS) electronically governed at 2,500 rpm
- 1,150 pound force-feet (1,559 N⋅m) @ 1,300 rpm, 330 horsepower (246 kW; 335 PS) electronically governed at 2,500 rpm
- 1,200 pound force-feet (1,627 N⋅m) @ 1,300 rpm, 400 horsepower (298 kW; 406 PS) electronically governed at 2,400 rpm
